= Revenue and Customs Commissioners v Maxwell =

- Court: Court of Appeal of England and Wales
- Citation: [2010] EWCA Civ 1379

Keywords
- Insolvency

Revenue and Customs Commissioners v Maxwell [2010] EWCA Civ 1379 is a UK insolvency law case, concerning pre-pack insolvencies.

== Facts ==
HMRC argued that at a creditors’ meeting to approve a prepack insolvency for the Mercury Tax Group Ltd it should have been given £8m worth of votes, rather than £1.5m admitted by the chairman, Edward Klempka. He was an insolvency practitioner appointed by Mercury’s directors, and was attempting to effect a sale of the business to the management. They argued there were impermissible deductions for payments to employee benefit trusts and substantial loans to directors.

The Judge held that only the liquidated debts had to be counted for the purpose of assessing the votes at the meeting, and it was within Klempka’s discretion to not count the HMRC debts.

== Judgment ==
Lord Neuberger MR allowed the appeal. The judge’s role was to form her own view, not merely review the chairman’s decision under IR 1986 r 2.39, and had been wrong to make up his mind based on what Klempka had seen and the judge had not. The chairman’s power of quantification had to take account of events occurring since the date of administration and before the meeting. Once the HMRC had amended its notices and given sums even though they came after the administration date and even though they could be challenged, they should be counted.

== See also ==
- UK insolvency law
