= Re Cheyne Finance plc =

- Court: High Court
- Citations: [2007] EWHC 2402 (Ch), [2008] BCC 182, [2008] 1 BCLC 741, [2008] Bus LR 1562, [2008] 2 All ER 987

Court membership
- Judge sitting: Briggs J

Keywords
- Cash flow test

Re Cheyne Finance plc [2007] EWHC 2402 (Ch), [2008] BCC 182 is a UK insolvency law case, concerning the definition of insolvency under the cash flow test.

== Facts ==
Cheyne Finance plc had built a number of structured investment vehicles.

== Judgment ==
Briggs J held that a court could take into account debts that would become payable in the near future, and perhaps further ahead, and whether paying those debts was likely.

== See also ==
- UK insolvency law
