= Re Kayley Vending Ltd =

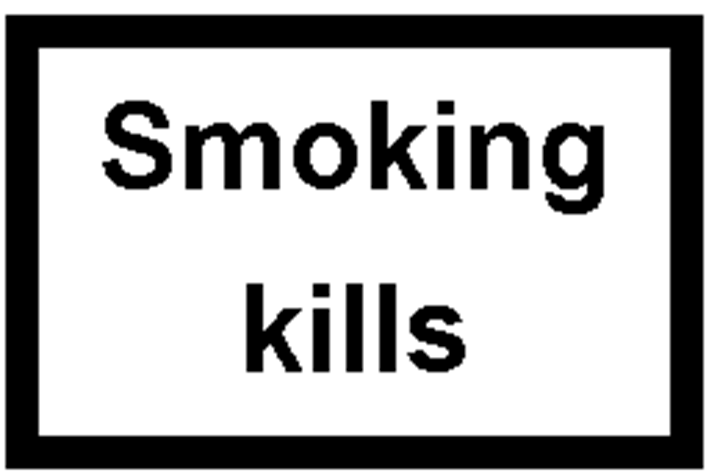
- Court: High Court
- Citations: [2009] EWHC 904 (Ch), [2009] BCC 578

Case opinions
- HH Judge Cooke

Keywords
- Administration

Re Kayley Vending Ltd [2009] EWHC 904 (Ch) is a UK insolvency law case concerning the pre-packaged administration procedure when a company is unable to repay its debts.

== Facts ==
Kayley Vending Ltd’s directors faced a winding up petition from HMRC because it had not yet paid £79,000 in taxes on its business of running cigarette machine vending machines in pubs. The directors applied to court for an administration order under IA 1986, Sch B1, para 12(1)(b). It planned a pre-packaged administration, which had been negotiated with the insolvency practitioners and the company’s competitors, who were likely to buy the business for the most. (HMRC’s petition precluded an out of court appointment under IA 1986, Sch B1, paras 25 and 22.) They contended the vending machines in pubs could not be sold off where they were, so the business would be worth far less if the company went into liquidation.

== Judgment ==
HH Judge Cooke held administration had a reasonable prospect of achieving a better return, and granted approval. Applicants for a prepack administration should provide sufficient information for a court to see that a prepack deal is not being used to disadvantage creditors. Furthermore, a proposed administrator’s costs may be counted as an expense of liquidation under para 13, and so it was here where the costs were incurred for the good of the creditors as a whole. It would not be so if a prepack sale was to the management, rather than an arm’s length purchaser. In the course of his judgment he discussed the concerns about pre-pack administrations.

6 I propose to examine briefly the nature of the concerns that have been expressed about pre-packs, and then the way in which the provisions of the 1986 Act as now in force, and the case law to date, have operated to give rise to them. The principal advantages of a pre-pack are well-known; they are that the process enables a business to be sold quickly, with the minimum possible adverse impact from either the public knowledge of its insolvency or the restrictions imposed by the insolvency process itself. Employees can be retained who might leave, or have to be dismissed, once a formal insolvency starts. Continuity of customer and supplier contracts can be maintained. Even if a going concern sale might be achieved by an administrator, the period of trading in administration whilst it is negotiated requires to be funded and may in any event result in a damaging leaching away of business.

7 The Association of Business Recovery Professionals publishes some helpful material on its website ( http://www.r3.org.uk/publications ), including a paper by Dr Sandra Frisby entitled “A Preliminary Analysis of Pre-packaged Administrations”. In that, she summarises the debate as being whether pre-packs are an appropriate and effective method of realising the assets of an insolvent business and sets out a number of specific objections:

- A pre-packaged business has not, by definition, been exposed to the competitive forces of the market, which may lead to the business being disposed of for a consideration less than would have been obtained had it been marketed for an appropriate period.
- Where a pre-pack is effected through administration, the rights of stakeholders to participate in the decision-making process, as envisaged by the Insolvency Act 1986, are frustrated.
- The pre-pack process is insufficiently transparent: creditors, or at least certain classes of creditors, are not provided with information adequate to allow them to measure whether the practitioner has carried out his functions in a manner that has not improperly or unlawfully prejudiced their interests
- … a lack of transparency inevitably results in a want of accountability: creditors are entitled to challenge the practitioner's conduct but are disabled from doing so without the information necessary to mount a challenge.
- Pre-packs may be unacceptably biased towards the interests of secured creditors, most notably floating charge holders. There may be no incentive to negotiate a consideration as a business much over the amount necessary to discharge the secured indebtedness …
- Pre-packs may also be geared rather more towards achieving enough to satisfy the claims of the floating charge holder and practitioner's fees and expenses, with no effort at capturing any premium over and above these amounts.
- Where a pre-pack involves the sale of the business to a party previously connected with the company, usually as director, the process resembles the practice of ‘phoenixing’ …
- … the opportunities for and appearances of collusion with the purchaser of the business are heavily amplified where a sale of the business is effected through a pre-pack.”

8 To these I might add a concern that is a corollary of one of the advantages claimed for the pre-pack. It is said that there may be difficulty obtaining funding in order to enable the administrator to continue to trade whilst he negotiates a sale of the business. If the negotiation process takes place before his appointment, and the business is continuing to trade in that period, there is an obvious risk that credit incurred in that period will not be paid so that the negotiation takes place at the expense of the creditors.

9 The data examined by Dr Frisby showed a sharp rise in the number of pre-pack cases, particularly in administration, since 2003. A high proportion of these cases were administrations, and in those cases she speculated that the increase was related to the introduction by the Enterprise Act of the ability to make appointments out of court. Other cases were receiverships, where there has been no similar procedural change. It may be (this is my speculation and not hers) that in these cases the increase is as a result of advisers and directors simply becoming more familiar with the availability of the pre-pack route and applying it to those cases where the floating chargeholder retains the ability to appoint an administrative receiver. Among a number of provisional conclusions, she noted that pre-packs from administration tended disproportionately to involve a sale to connected parties and particularly directors, that they seemed on average to produce a better out-turn in terms of employment preserved and returns to secured creditors, but a worse one in terms of return to unsecured creditors, in each case by comparison with sales negotiated after appointment by the administrators.

10 The cynical concerns of those outside the process have been expressed elsewhere in rather more trenchant terms. Writing in Recovery magazine in Autumn 2005 Mr Jon Moulton, who is a knowledgeable insider as the founder of a well-known company specialising in acquiring and turning round underperforming businesses, headed his article “The uncomfortable edge of propriety-prepacks or just stitch ups?” and said this:

“A company is heading into trouble. Its directors and shareholders are introduced to an appealing fellow who drives a very nice BMW who explains that if they work with him they will get rid of most of their creditors and buy back the business pretty well immediately at a very modest cost. Great sales pitch!

All they need to do is work with him to sort out an administration at a convenient date with, of course, a suitably appealing fellow to act as administrator at a fee commensurate with his taste in cars.

The directors are concerned that the administrator will sell to someone else at such a bargain price … doesn't he have to look for the highest price?

The answer, much accompanied by head and eye movements, is that as long as you can come up with a plausible answer to the effect that it seemed likely no one else was interested (quite likely in view of the secrecy) or that the directors were likely to pay the best price (anybody's guess) or it would be too damaging to the business to shop it around (clearly an adoptable opinion) then there is no need to offer the company around. Funnily enough, the rapid growth in pre-packs … has given rise to unpleasant practices.

The organising administrator has a clear conflict of interest as typically he wants to get the appointment and the management can influence that … It may suit a bank as it can allow it to participate in the equity going forward in a controlled way or to provide it with an assured return potentially at the expense of other creditors. Administrators generally like helping banks.

In the real world you see what look to be abusive practices. Pre-packs are carefully planned months or weeks in advance. Potentially, all goods and services acquired thereafter are being acquired with no intention of payment … but rarely do you see companies ceasing to incur credit for a period before a pre-pack…

The victims are usually the general creditors as the assets are sold at an undervalue but they struggle to prove it or lack the economic incentive to go to law in often complex circumstances. Who do they sue–the company (worthless), the directors (probably dodgy) or the administrator (professionally advised and well-informed)?

The USA has a more ordered form of pre-pack with some judicial review. Here the prepack is not a legal structure but a practice. There is an infrequent need for pre-packs BUT only rarely is there a compelling case for not trying hard to follow the law by seeking to maximise realisations for creditors …

This whole area of pre-packs needs regulation … Perhaps a judge should bless prepacks before they are implemented.”

11 A general summary of these concerns would be that the speed and secrecy which give rise to the advantages claim for pre-packs may too easily lead the directors and the insolvency practitioner to arrive at a solution which is convenient for both of them and their interests (perhaps also satisfying a secured creditor who might be in a position to appoint his own receiver or administrator), but which harms the interests of the general creditors because:

(i) it may not achieve the best price for the assets
(ii) credit may be incurred inappropriately in the pre-appointment period
(iii) they are deprived of the opportunity to influence the transaction before it takes place, and
(iv) having been presented with a fait accompli, they have insufficient information to make it worthwhile investigating and challenging the decisions taken.

12 It was no doubt in response to these concerns that SIP 16 was drafted and promulgated. It will act as a salutary reminder to insolvency practitioners of their responsibilities, which may influence the way in which they and the directors act, although it does not provide the creditors with any direct input into the decisions they take. It will however provide creditors with information on the basis of which they may ask questions and, possibly, seek redress after the fact. Any creditor who is dissatisfied with a pre-pack sale is of course still subject to the lack of economic incentive that Mr Moulton referred to: he may in practice have to fund the whole cost of investigating his concerns and any resulting litigation, at the end of which even if successful recoveries are uncertain and in any event go in to the general pool of assets from which, at best, he is only likely to receive an enhanced dividend.

== See also ==
- UK insolvency law
