= Report of the Review Committee on Insolvency Law and Practice =

Report of the Review Committee on Insolvency Law and Practice (1982) Cmnd 8558, also known as the "Cork Report", was an investigation and set of recommendations on modernisation and reform of UK insolvency law. It was chaired by Kenneth Cork and was commissioned by the Labour government in 1977. The Cork Report was followed by a White Paper in 1984, A Revised Framework for Insolvency Law (1984) Cmnd 9175, and these led to the Insolvency Act 1986.

== Principles ==
The two key principles suggested by Cork were:

Insolvency laws were treated by the trading community as an instrument in the process of debt recovery and constitute in many cases, the sanction of last resort for the enforcement of obligations; Insolvency laws were the means by which the demands of commercial morality can be met, through the investigation and the disciplinary measures and restrictions imposed on the bankrupt.

== Recommendations ==
=== Rescue culture ===
The central argument of the report was that too many companies were simply left to die, when they could be revived, saved or brought to a close in a more orderly way. Cork advocated that the law should encourage a "rescue culture", to restore companies back to profitability, which would be in the longer term interests of creditors.

=== Floating charges ===
It also said there was no place for automatic crystallisation of floating charges ‘in modern insolvency law’, on the basis that it would adversely affect other creditors and that the charge did not need to be registered.

=== Professional regulation ===
Cork recommended that private insolvency practitioners should be professionally regulated to ensure adequate standards of competence and integrity. Creditors be given a greater voice in the choice of the liquidator and new penalties and constraints be placed on errant directors. Cork also proposed reforms designed to increase the survival chances of firms in difficulties. He had informed the press, on the establishment of his committee, that many more companies could be saved if outside administrators could be brought into the process.

== See also ==
- Insolvency Act 1986
- UK insolvency law
