= IRC v Wimbledon Football Club Ltd =

- Court: Court of Appeal of England and Wales
- Citation: [2004] EWCA Civ 655, [2005] 1 BCLC 66

Keywords
- Insolvency

IRC v Wimbledon Football Club Ltd [2004] EWCA Civ 655 is a UK insolvency law case, concerning Company Voluntary Arrangements.

== Facts ==
Wimbledon FC put forward a Company Voluntary Arrangement. It said Football Creditors should be paid everything, while preferential creditors, including HMRC would get 30 pence in the pound. If the Football Creditors were not paid in full under league rules, the team could not continue to play in the League. The administrators argued this would frustrate the purpose of the sale, and mean there would be nothing at all to pay the Inland Revenue. The Football Creditors were to be paid from funds provided by the club purchaser under the sale agreement, without reducing the price paid for the club itself.

== Judgment ==
Court of Appeal held there was no infringement of Insolvency Act 1986 section 4(4). If payment had reduced the price, there would have, because then in substance, funds would have come from the company, and the CVA would have had to have been revoked.

== See also ==
- UK insolvency law
