= Revenue and Customs Comrs v Holland =

2010 United Kingdom legal case

Re Paycheck Services 3 Ltd
- Court: Supreme Court of the United Kingdom
- Full case name: Revenue and Customs Commissioners v Holland
- Decided: 24 November 2010
- Citation: [2010] UKSC 51

Keywords
- Misfeasance, de facto director

Re Paycheck Services 3 Ltd or Revenue and Customs Commissioners v Holland [2010] UKSC 51 is a UK insolvency law and company law case, concerning misfeasance.

== Facts ==
Mr Holland set up several composite companies that paid salaries and dividends to its contractors as if they were employees and nonvoting shareholders, so as to reduce the amount of tax they paid, but not load them with the administrative burdens if they set up themselves as companies. However the tax scheme failed because the result of the share structure was that Holland was in control of them and they were associated for tax purposes, each was liable for high corporation tax and the companies went insolvent. Holland was the director of another company which itself was the director of those companies, and the Revenue was the sole remaining creditor. It claimed Holland was liable under Insolvency Act 1986 section 212 to account for dividends as they were misapplied or Holland was guilty of misfeasance or breach of fiduciary duty, and for that Holland needed to be treated as a de facto director.

== Judgment ==
Lord Hope, Lord Collins and Lord Saville held that because the parent company and Holland were separate legal persons, simply acting as a director of a corporate director was not enough to make Holland a de facto director. Holland needed to have assumed responsibility in relation to the subject companies, but he had only discharged his duties as director. If he was the "guiding mind" then that would be true in all cases of corporate directors.

Lord Walker and Lord Clarke dissented and would have held that if Holland deliberately procured dividend payments he was a de facto director of the composite companies and owed them a fiduciary duty.

== See also ==
- UK insolvency law
- UK company law
