= Re Conegrade Ltd =

- Court: Court of Appeal of England and Wales
- Citations: [2002] EWHC 2411 (Ch), [2003] BPIR 358

Keywords
- Insolvency, voidable transaction

Re Conegrade Ltd or Saxton v Clarke [2002] EWHC 2411 (Ch) is a UK insolvency law case, concerning voidable transactions.

== Facts ==
Conegrade Ltd was a small engineering company. It had four directors, two of which were Mr and Mrs Clarke. Conegrade Ltd had a loan account, which included debts for loans by directors to the company. All board members attended a vote, and voted in favour, of selling a freehold property in Station Road, Uppingham, worth £125,000 to Mr and Mrs Clarke. These two directors would then lease the property back to the company, but they paid only £64,808, which was the balance in the loan account. This settled a debt owed by the company to the Clarkes. Conegrade Ltd was insolvent within a year or so. The liquidators argued the transaction was a preference under IA 1986 section 239.

== Judgment ==
Lloyd J held that the only compelling reason for the transfer was the rightly presumed desire to place Mr and Mrs Clarke in a better position, above the creditors.

== See also ==
- UK insolvency law
