= Loreburn Report =

The Loreburn Report, or the Report of the Company Law Amendment Committee (1906) Cd 3052 was a report to the UK Parliament on the reform of company law. It discussed various issues of corporate financial reform. Three members of the committee dissented on the question of retaining the floating charge in UK insolvency law, and recommended it be abolished by statute.

== Content ==
One of the key issues of debate concerned the use of the floating charge. The majority recommended minor reforms to ensure that floating charges created without new money being given could be avoided. A minority dissented, and recommended abolition. The majority said the following.

floating charges, whilst facilitating largely the raising of money for industrial and co-operative and financial purposes, do not (especially having regard to the stringent provisions as to registration) interfere with the general creditors of the company to such an extent as to justify the recommendation of their abolition. Nor do we recommend any provision making void floating charges as against existing creditors of the company, that is, existing at the time when the floating charge is created. WE think that this would in a great measure destroy the essential value of a floating charge... But, upon the whole, the majority of us think that it would be desirable to amend the law by providing that a floating charge given within three months before the commencement of the winding up of a company, shall be invalid, except to the extent of the cash actually advanced at, or subsequently to, the creation of the charge, together with interest at a rate not exceeding 5 per cent per annum, unless it is proved that the company was solvent at the time the charge was created.

A Minority dissented on this point.

A company has not the restraint which the fear of bankruptcy imposes on an individual trader who will not risk his reputation by reckless trading when so much disrepute attaches to insolvency.... There is no similar disability attaching to the directors of a company, and little or no personal discredit falls upon them if their company fails to pay a dividend to its trade creditors. It is, therefore, all the more important that the amount and manner of borrowing by a corporation should be upon a satisfactory basis.’

‘We do not consider that a company should have any greater facility for borrowing than an individual, and we think that while a company should have unrestricted power to mortgage or charge its fixed assets and should be allowed to contract that other fixed assets substituted for those charged should become subject to the charge, and the company should also be capable of charging existing chattels and book debts or other things in action, it ought to be rendered incapable of charging after acquired chattels, or future book debts, or other property not in existence at the time of the creation of the charge.’

This could reduce borrowing amounts, but this is not undesirable, because it would decrease excess borrowing. And there will be ‘a larger general credit by reason of trade creditors no longer having the fear that the whole of the assets will be swept away by the debenture holders.
