= Re Produce Marketing Consortium Ltd (No 2) =

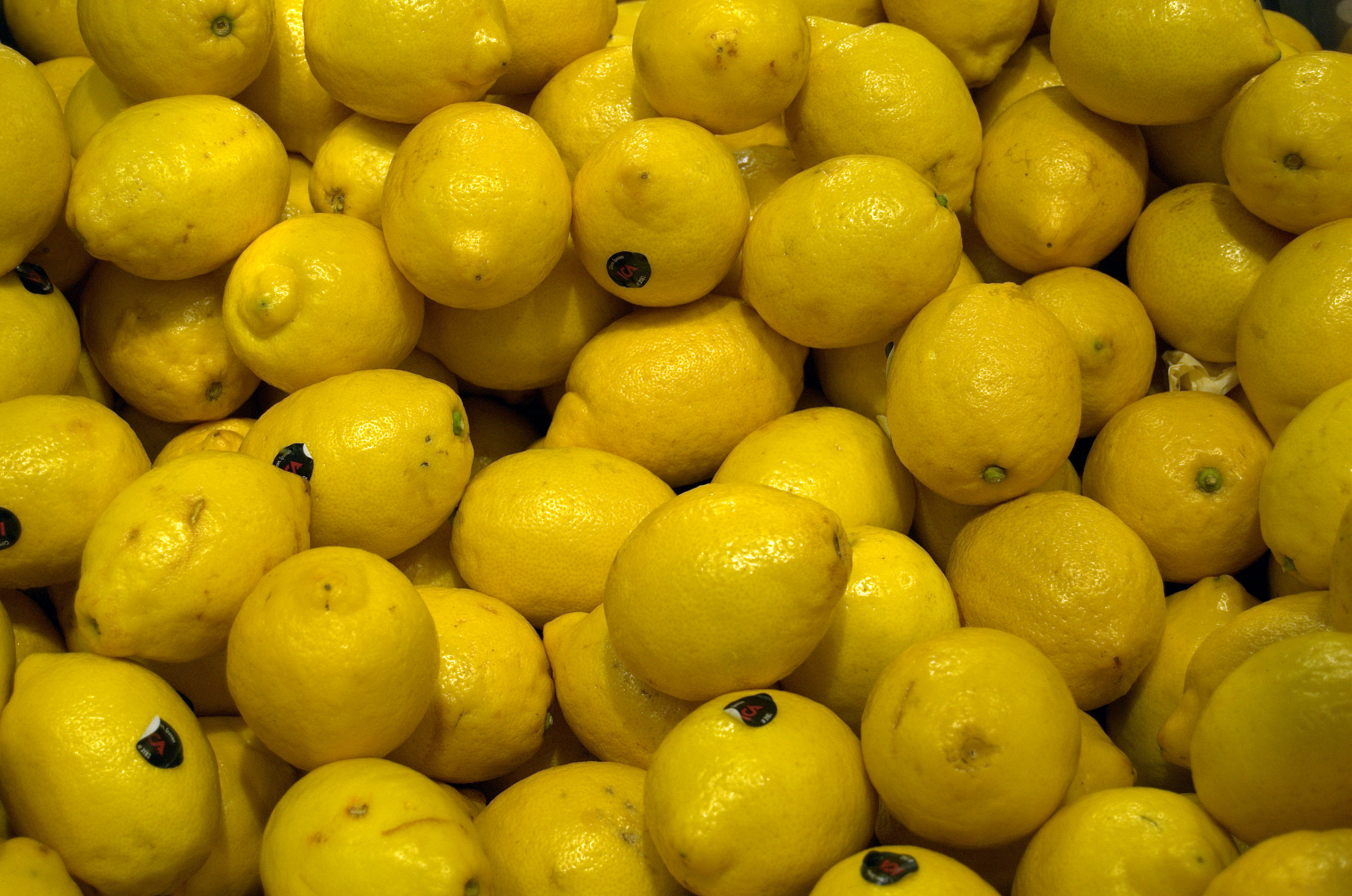
- Court: High Court
- Citation: [1989] 5 BCC 569

Case opinions
- Knox J

Keywords
- wrongful trading

Re Produce Marketing Consortium Ltd (No 2) [1989] 5 BCC 569 was the first UK company law or UK insolvency law case under the wrongful trading provision of s 214 Insolvency Act 1986.

== Facts ==
Eric Peter David and Ronald William Murphy ran Produce Marketing Consortium Ltd, importing lemons, grapefruit and oranges from Cyprus (previously, more Spain). It got shipped to Portsmouth. They were the only employees by the end (except David’s wife who did clerical work for £70 per month). PMC was incorporated in 1964 as an amalgamation of three smaller businesses. David was director from the start, and owned half the shares. As other directors left and died, Murphy became the other director in 1974. He had no accountancy qualifications, but was an experienced bookkeeper. The company earned profit through a 3.5% commission on the gross sale price of the fruit which was imported through its agency. But the business was dropping because they lost business of a large Spanish exporter. They made losses of £14K, £25K and £21K in 1981, 1982 and 1983, and a profit of £43 in 1984, by which time there was a bank overdraft of £91K. The report for that year was that,

“At the balance sheet date, the company was insolvent but the directors are confident that if the company continues to trade, it will be able to meet its liabilities.”

The auditor said the company’s continuation depended on the bank’s continued facilities. Banco Exterior SA took a secured debenture on 18 October 1983 on all property and assets, present and future, including good will, book debts and uncalled capital (but fixed assets were only £5000). They also took a personal guarantee from David for £30K. The draft accounts for 1984-6 were produced by auditors six months late in January 1987. They showed a £55K loss and £29K loss, with liabilities over assets reaching £175K. Auditors warned of insolvent trading, if the bank did not give more credit. The bank did oblige in March, but less than before. The overdraft decreased, but debt to its most important Cypriot shipper increased to £175K. The company was put in creditors’ voluntary liquidation on 2 October 1987, with debts of £317,694, half owed to one Cypriot shipping firm, as a trade creditor that brought them fruit. In 1988 the liquidator asked David and Murphy why there was trading while insolvent. David replied that they knew liquidation was inevitable in February with the accounts, and trading was continued because there was perishable fruit in cold store. The liquidator sought them to contribute £107,946 each, plus costs the court saw fit. The liquidator argued that the right measure to contribute was the reduction in net assets caused by the wrongful trading.

Miss Mary Arden QC was acting for the liquidator.

== Judgment ==
Knox J held that £75K should be contributed by both (not each). David should pay the first £50K and above that they would be jointly liable. They should have concluded in July 1986 there was no reasonable prospect of avoiding this, and though they did not have the accounts till January 1987 they had an intimate knowledge of the business and must have known turnover was well down on previous years. s 214(4) was applied, so it did not matter that they may not have actually known about the accounts. They ought to have known the results for the financial year 1985-6. The two had not taken steps they should have under s 214(3). After February 1987, trading was not limited to realising the fruit in cold store. Overall, s 214 was compensatory, not penal, and the right amount to contribute was the amount caused to be depleted by the directors’ conduct. The key parts of Knox J's decision were as follows.

This was a new provision in the Insolvency Act 1985, s 15. It contrasts with s 213 of the Insolvency Act 1986 in relation to fraudulent trading, which is derived from s 630 of the Companies Act 1985, itself derived (with some amendments) from s 332 of the Companies Act 1948, in turn derived from the Companies Act 1929, s 275 . Under these latter successive enactments the intent to defraud had to be established in relation to the particular person sought to be charged, and although in Re William C Leitch Bros Ltd [1932] 2 Ch 71, Maugham J. held (at p 77) that if a company continued to carry on business and to incur debts at a time when there was to the knowledge of the directors no reasonable prospect of the creditors ever receiving payment of those debts, it was, in general, a proper inference that the company was carrying on business with intent to defraud, there were authorities which exonerated from liability under the fraudulent trading legislation persons who honestly hoped that creditors would be paid off one day, albeit that this was not a reasonable expectation by any objective standard. Thus I was referred to an unreported decision of Buckley J in Re White & Osmond (Parkstone) Ltd (30 June 1960), in the course of which he said:

“In my judgment, there is nothing wrong in the fact that directors incur credit at a time when, to their knowledge, the company is not able to meet all its liabilities as they fall due. What is manifestly wrong is if directors allow a company to incur credit at a time when the business is being carried on in such circumstances that it is clear the company will never be able to satisfy its creditors. However, there is nothing to say that directors who genuinely believe that the clouds will roll away and the sunshine of prosperity will shine upon them again and disperse the fog of their depression are not entitled to incur credit to help them to get over the bad time.”

Buckley J also referred to another decision of Maugham J in Re Patrick and Lyon Ltd [1933] Ch 786, where (at p 790) he expressed the opinion, regarding s 275 of the Companies Act 1929:

“that the words ‘defraud’ and ‘fraudulent purpose,’ where they appear, in the section in question, are words which connote actual dishonesty involving, according to current notions of fair trading among commercial men, real moral blame.”

The Insolvency Act 1986 now has two separate provisions: s 213 dealing with fraudulent trading – to which the passages which I have quoted from the judgments of Maugham J and Buckley J no doubt are still applicable – and s 214 which deals with what the side-note calls “wrongful trading”. It is evident that Parliament intended to widen the scope of the legislation under which directors who trade on when the company is insolvent may, in appropriate circumstances, be required to make a contribution to the assets of the company which, in practical terms, means its creditors.

Two steps in particular were taken in the legislative enlargement of the court's jurisdiction. First, the requirement for an intent to defraud and fraudulent purpose was not retained as an essential, and with it goes the need for what Maugham J. called “actual dishonesty involving real moral blame”.

I pause here to observe that at no stage before me has it been suggested that either Mr David or Mr Murphy fell into this category.

The second enlargement is that the test to be applied by the court has become one under which the director in question is to be judged by the standards of what can be expected of a person fulfilling his functions, and showing reasonable diligence in doing so. I accept Mr. Teverson's submission in this connection, that the requirement to have regard to the functions to be carried out by the director in question, in relation to the company in question, involves having regard to the particular company and its business. It follows that the general knowledge, skill and experience postulated will be much less extensive in a small company in a modest way of business, with simple accounting procedures and equipment, than it will be in a large company with sophisticated procedures.

Nevertheless, certain minimum standards are to be assumed to be attained. Notably there is an obligation laid on companies to cause accounting records to be kept which are such as to disclose with reasonable accuracy at any time the financial position of the company at that time (Companies Act 1985, s 221(1) and (2)(a)). In addition directors are required to prepare a profit and loss account for each financial year and a balance sheet as at the end of it (Companies Act 1985, s 227(1) and (3)). Directors are also required, in respect of each financial year, to lay before the company in general meeting copies of the accounts of the company for that year and to deliver to the registrar of companies a copy of those accounts, in the case of a private company, within ten months after the end of the relevant accounting reference period (Companies Act 1985, s 241(1) and (3), and s 242(1) and (2)(a)).

As I have already mentioned, Mr. Halls gave evidence that the accounting records of PMC were adequate for the purposes of its business. The preparation of accounts was woefully late, more especially in relation to those dealing with the year ending 30 September 1985, which should have been laid and delivered by the end of July 1986.

The knowledge to be imputed in testing whether or not directors knew or ought to have concluded that there was no reasonable prospect of the company avoiding insolvent liquidation is not limited to the documentary material actually available at the given time. This appears from s 214(4) which includes a reference to facts which a director of a company ought not only to know but those which he ought to ascertain, a word which does not appear in s 214(2)(b) . In my judgment this indicates that there is to be included by way of factual information not only what was actually there but what, given reasonable diligence and an appropriate level of general knowledge, skill and experience, was ascertainable. This leads me to the conclusion in this case that I should assume, for the purposes of applying the test in s 214(2), that the financial results for the year ending 30 September 1985 were known at the end of July 1986 at least to the extent of the size of the deficiency of assets over liabilities.

Mr. David and Mr. Murphy, although they did not have the accounts in their hands until January 1987, did, I find, know that the previous trading year had been a very bad one. They had a close and intimate knowledge of the business and they had a shrewd idea whether the turnover was up of down. In fact it was badly down in that year to £526,459 and although I have no doubt that they did not know in July 1986 that it was that precise figure, I have no doubt that they had a good rough idea of what it was and in particular that it was well down on the previous year. A major drop in turnover meant almost as night follows day that there was a substantial loss incurred, as indeed there was. That, in turn, meant again, as surely as night following day, a substantial increase in the deficit of assets over liabilities.

That deals with their actual knowledge but, in addition, I have to have regard to what they have to be treated as having known or ascertained, and that includes the actual deficit of assets over liabilities of £132,870. This was £80,000 over Mr. David's personal guarantee. It was a deficit that, for an indefinite period in the future, could not be made good, even if the optimistic prognostications of level of turnover entertained by Mr. David and Mr. Murphy were achieved. They later estimated, when they visited the bank on 16 February 1987, a turnover of £1.6m. If one assumes half as much again, at £2.4m, the gross income of the company would only have risen to £84,000 and the overheads were accepted as being not less than £65,000. That gives a notional profit of £19,000 per annum. If one takes the figure of £1.6m, overheads of £65,000 would not have been covered.

Mr. Teverson was not able to advance any particular calculation as constituting a basis for concluding that there was a prospect of insolvent liquidation being avoided. He is not to be criticised for that for, in my judgement, there was none available. Once the loss in the year ending 30 September 1985 was incurred PMC was in irreversible decline, assuming (as I must) that the directors had no plans for altering the company's business and proposed to go on drawing the level of reasonable remuneration that they were currently receiving.

It was stated by Mr. David that the persons and companies with whom PMC did business were in the main long established trading partners. In fact that could not be said of Ramona which was, by July 1986, a very important creditor. But even if one disregards that aspect, it would not be right to assume that even old established trading partners will wait indefinitely to have their debts paid. Nor, in my judgment, do the facts that the bank was throughout willing to continue its facilities and that Mr. Tough, although expressing the grave warnings that he did when the accounts for the years ending 30 September 1985 and 1986 were available to him, was willing to accompany Mr. David and Mr. Murphy to the bank in February 1987 to see if further facilities would be granted, detract from the conclusion I have reached that Mr. David and Mr. Murphy ought to have concluded at the end of July 1986 that there was no reasonable prospect that PMC would avoid going into insolvent liquidation. The bank was secured by Mr. David's guarantee, if not to any significant extent by the other securities which it took, and Mr. Tough's attitude was never more than one of doubt and caution.

The next question which arises is whether there is a case under s 214(3) for saying that after the end of July 1986 the respondents took every step with a view to minimising the potential loss to the creditors of PMC as, assuming them to have known that there was no reasonable prospect of PMC avoiding insolvent liquidation, they ought to have taken. This clearly has to be answered “No”, since they went on trading for another year.

Mr. Teverson gallantly attempted to establish that – assuming that the first time when the respondents ought to have concluded that there was no such reasonable prospect was February 1987 when they actually signed the preceding two years' accounts – their decision to trade on so as to realise the fruit in cold store to the best advantage satisfied the requirement of s 214(3) . I would not have accepted that submission in any event because the continued trading was far from limited to the realisation of the fruit in cold store, and Ramona were not told, as they should have been, what the true financial picture was so as to be given the opportunity of deciding for themselves what to do. But this is academic because that submission, even if correct in relation to February 1987, quite plainly was untenable in relation to the end of July 1986.

I am therefore driven to the conclusion that the court's discretion arises under s 214(1) . Upon the nature of that discretion there were conflicting submissions made to me. Mr. Teverson submitted that the court's discretion is entirely at large, and he pointed to no less than three sets of words indicating the existence of a wide discretion: the court may declare that that person is to be liable to make such contribution (if any) to the company's assets as the court thinks proper . He also submitted that the provision is both compensatory and penal in character. He referred me to Re William C Leitch Bros Ltd at pp. 79–80, where Maugham J said of s 275 of the Companies Act 1929:

“I am inclined to the view that s 275 is in the nature of a punitive provision, and that where the Court makes such a declaration in relation to ‘all or any of the debts or other liabilities of the company,’ it is in the discretion of the Court to make an order without limiting the order to the amount of the debts of those creditors proved to have been defrauded by the acts of the director in question, though no doubt the order would in general be so limited.”

However, Mr. Teverson also submitted that the amount which the court concluded had been lost as a result of the wrongful trading should provide a ceiling for the figure which the court declared should be contributed to the company's assets, which is of course the exact opposite of what Maugham J. said in that regard. He also relied upon the provisions of s 214(3) which prevent the exercise of the discretion under subsection (1) in any case where, to put it briefly, the director has done everything possible to minimise loss to creditors, and suggested that it would be inequitable for a director who has just failed to escape scot-free under the provision because he had only done nearly but not quite everything to that end, to be treated on a par with a director who had done nothing to minimise loss to creditors.

Miss Arden, for the liquidator, submitted that s 214 of the Insolvency Act 1986 gave a purely civil remedy, unlike the predecessors of s 213 of that Act, such as s 275 of the Companies Act 1929 and s 332 of the Companies Act 1948 which combined the civil and criminal. More significantly, for my purpose, she submitted that s 214 was compensatory rather than penal. What is ordered to be contributed goes to increase the company's assets for the benefit of the general body of creditors. On that basis she submitted that the proper measure was the reduction in the net assets which could be identified as caused by the wrongful activities of the persons ordered to contribute. This jurisdiction, it was submitted, is an enhanced version of the right which any company would have to sue its directors for breach of duty; enhanced in the sense that the standard of knowledge, skill and experience required is made objective.

On this analysis, once the circumstances required for the exercise of discretion under s 214(1) are shown to exist, she submitted that the situation was analogous to that obtaining where a tort such as negligence was shown to have been committed, in that quantum was a matter of causation and not culpability. The discretion given to the court was to enable allowance to be made for questions of causation and also to avoid unjust results such as unwarranted windfalls for creditors. Thus in Liquidator of West Mercia Safetywear Ltd v Dodd (1988) 4 BCC 30, at p 33, Dillon LJ said of s 333 of the Companies Act 1948:

“The section in question, however, s 333 of the Companies Act 1948, provides that the court may order the delinquent director to repay or restore the money, with interest at such rate as the court thinks fit, or to contribute such sum to the assets of the company by way of compensation in respect of the misapplication as the court thinks fit. The court has a discretion over the matter of relief, and it is permissible for the delinquent director to submit that the wind should be tempered because, for instance, full repayment would produce a windfall to third parties, or, alternatively, because it would involve money going round in a circle or passing through the hands of someone else whose position is equally tainted.”

In my judgment the jurisdiction under s 214 is primarily compensatory rather than penal. Prima facie the appropriate amount that a director is declared to be liable to contribute is the amount by which the company's assets can be discerned to have been depleted by the director's conduct which caused the discretion under s 214(1) to arise. But Parliament has indeed chosen very wide words of discretion and it would be undesirable to seek to spell out limits on that discretion, more especially since this is, so far as counsel were aware, the first case to come to judgment under this section. The fact that there was no fraudulent intent is not of itself a reason for fixing the amount at a nominal or low figure, for that would amount to frustrating what I discern as Parliament's intention in adding s 214 to s 213 in the Insolvency Act 1986, but I am not persuaded that it is right to ignore that fact totally.

I take into account the following factors in addition to those set out above, which give rise to the existence of the court's discretion under s 214(1):

1. This was a case of failure to appreciate what should have been clear, rather than a deliberate course of wrongdoing.
2. There were occasions when positive untruths were stated which cannot just be treated as unwarranted optimism. Mr. David in particular is given to a flowing turn of phrase. He referred to PMC's continuing to trade as “the ship of state sailing on”. That, in itself, is not to be held against him, although it is doubtless a symptom of his inability to see the realities of the current trading position. But when, as happened more than once, a statement of fact was made which was positively untrue, that is to be held against him.
3. The most solemn warning given by the auditor in early February 1987 was effectively ignored. I do not regard Mr. Tough's attendance at the bank on 10 February as indicating even tacitly that if the bank agreed to extend facilities it would be proper to carry on trading.
4. Mr. David has given a guarantee to the bank with a limit of £50,000. The bank will have a charge over anything which Mr. David or Mr. Murphy contributes pursuant to my order. Pro tanto that will relieve Mr. David from his guarantee liability.
5. The affairs of PMC were conducted during the last seven months of trading in a way which reduced the indebtedness to the bank, to which Mr. David had given a guarantee, at the expense of trade creditors and in particular Ramona. The bank is, if not fully, at least substantially secured. If this jurisdiction is to be exercised, as in my judgment it should be in this case, it needs to be exercised in a way which will benefit unsecured creditors.
6. The evidence regarding the disappearance of debtors from the statement of affairs is not entirely clear and there remains in my mind an element of speculation on the extent to which it is right to fix on £22,000 as the amount to be treated as having been overstated in September 1986.

Taking all these circumstances into account I propose to declare that Mr. David and Mr. Murphy are liable to make a contribution to the assets of PMC of £75,000.

As between the two of them it seems to me right that Mr. David should indemnify Mr. Murphy as to £50,000 and that above that figure they should be jointly liable. As against the liquidator they should be jointly and severally liable for the whole £75,000. I take this view regarding the indemnity to be given by Mr. David partly because Mr. David was Mr. Murphy's senior in every sense – age, standing in the company and personality – but principally because of the existence of Mr. David's guarantee to the bank. Naturally Mr. Teverson was not in a position to make submissions to me how matters should be dealt with as between his two clients, and I should be sorry to see the costs, which must already run the risk of eroding the benefits which the section is intended to confer on creditors, further increased.

== See also ==
- UK insolvency law
- Wrongful trading
- Re Brian D Pierson (Contractors) Ltd [2001] 1 BCLC 275, [1999] BCC 26
