= Company Directors Disqualification Act 1986 =

Act of the Parliament of the United Kingdom

Company Directors Disqualification Act 1986 (Note: Section 26.)
- Act of Parliament
- Parliament of the United Kingdom
- Long title: An Act to consolidate certain enactments relating to the disqualification of persons from being directors of companies, and from being otherwise concerned with a company’s affairs.
- Citation: 1986 c. 46
- Territorial extent: England and Wales; Scotland; Northern Ireland (in part); (Note: Section 24.)

Dates
- Royal assent: 25 July 1986
- Commencement: various (Note: Section 25. See Insolvency Act 1986.)

Other legislation
- Amends: See § Repealed enactments
- Repeals/revokes: See § Repealed enactments
- Amended by: Companies Act 1989; Deregulation and Contracting Out Act 1994; Youth Justice and Criminal Evidence Act 1999; Insolvency Act 2000; Financial Services and Markets Act 2000 (Consequential Amendments and Repeals) Order 2001; Enterprise Act 2002; Communications Act 2003; Water Act 2003; Courts Act 2003; National Health Service (Consequential Provisions) Act 2006; Bankruptcy (Scotland) Act 2016 (Consequential Provisions and Modifications) Order 2016; Companies Act 2006 (Consequential Amendments etc) Order 2008; Banking Act 2009; Building Societies (Insolvency and Special Administration) Order 2009; Co-operative and Community Benefit Societies and Credit Unions Act 2010; Charitable Incorporated Organisations (Consequential Amendments) Order 2012; Financial Services (Banking Reform) Act 2013; Financial Services Act 2012 (Mutual Societies) Order 2013; Co-operative and Community Benefit Societies Act 2014; Enterprise and Regulatory Reform Act 2013 (Competition) (Consequential, Transitional and Saving Provisions) Order 2014; Deregulation Act 2015; Small Business, Enterprise and Employment Act 2015; Office of Rail Regulation (Change of Name) Regulations 2015; Bankruptcy (Scotland) Act 2016 (Consequential Provisions and Modifications) Order 2016; Technical and Further Education Act 2017Risk Transformation Regulations 2017; Competition (Amendment etc.) (EU Exit) Regulations 2019; Rating (Coronavirus) and Directors Disqualification (Dissolved Companies) Act 2021; Health and Care Act 2022; Economic Crime and Corporate Transparency Act 2023; Finance Act 2024; Digital Markets, Competition and Consumers Act 2024
- Relates to: Insolvency Act 1986

Status: Amended

Text of statute as originally enacted

Revised text of statute as amended

Text of the Company Directors Disqualification Act 1986 as in force today (including any amendments) within the United Kingdom, from legislation.gov.uk.

The Company Directors Disqualification Act 1986 (c. 46) is an act of the Parliament of the United Kingdom that forms part of UK company law and sets out the procedures for company directors to be disqualified in certain cases of misconduct.

== Background ==
Lord Millett, in the opinion he gave in Official Receiver v Wadge Rapps & Hunt [2003] UKHL 49 (31 July 2003), summarized the history of disqualification orders in British company law, noting that they were originally created under section 75 of the Companies Act 1928 (subsequently consolidated as section 275 of the Companies Act 1929), which was enacted on the recommendation of the Report of the Company Law Amendment Committee (1925-1926) under the chairmanship of Mr Wilfred Greene KC (Cmd 2657). It gave the official receiver, the liquidator or any creditor or contributary the ability to apply to the court having jurisdiction to wind up the company, for an order to disqualify a director from being concerned in the management of a company for a period up to five years. Such order was up to the discretion of the court.

The scope of that provision was subsequently expanded as follows:

- Section 33 of the Companies Act 1947 (subsequently consolidated as section 188 of the Companies Act 1948), following the Report of the Committee on Company Law Amendment (1945) under the chairmanship of Cohen J (Cmd 6659), extended the grounds upon which a disqualification order could be made.
- Section 28 of the Companies Act 1976 provided for the case where a person had been persistently in default in relation to statutory requirements for returns, accounts or other documents. Such an order could only be sought by the Secretary of State, as it was not a requirement that the company should be insolvent or in the course of winding up.
- Section 9 of the Insolvency Act 1976 covered the case where a person had been a director of more than one company which had gone into liquidation while insolvent and his conduct as a director of any of those companies made him unfit to be concerned in the management of a company.
- Section 93 of the Companies Act 1981 extended the maximum period of disqualification to 15 years.

The CDDA consolidated the law relating to disqualification orders and introduced the concept of mandatory disqualification, following up on Sir Kenneth Cork's recommendations in the Insolvency Law and Practice, Report of the Review Committee (1982) (Cmnd 8558). That report recommended that application for a mandatory order should be made by the liquidator or, with the leave of the court, by a creditor. This was not acceptable to Parliament, which understandably considered that greater safeguards are necessary in the case of a mandatory order than are required where the court retains a discretion to decline to make an order.

== Disqualification orders and undertakings ==
A court may, and under section 6 shall, make against a person a disqualification order, for a period specified in the order, providing that:

- he shall not be a director of a company, act as receiver of a company’s property or in any way, whether directly or indirectly, be concerned or take part in the promotion, formation or management of a company unless (in each case) he has the leave of the court, and
- he shall not act as an insolvency practitioner. (s. 1)

The Secretary of State may also accept disqualification undertakings from such persons in specified circumstances, which will have similar effect. (s.1A)

== Disqualification at the discretion of the court ==
The court may make a disqualification order where:

- the person is convicted of an indictable offence (whether on indictment or summarily) in connection with the promotion, formation, management, liquidation or striking off of a company with the receivership of a company's property or with his being an administrative receiver of a company. (s. 2)
- it appears to the court that he has been persistently in default in relation to provisions of the companies legislation requiring any return, account or other document to be filed with, delivered or sent, or notice of any matter to be given, to the registrar of companies. (s. 3)
- in the course of the winding up of a company, it appears that he—

(a) has been guilty of an offence for which he is liable (whether he has been convicted or not) under s. 458 of the Companies Act 1985 (fraudulent trading), or
(b) has otherwise been guilty, while an officer or liquidator of the company receiver of the company's property or administrative receiver of the company, of any fraud in relation to the company or of any breach of his duty as such officer, liquidator, receiver or administrative receiver. (s. 4)

- a person is convicted (either on indictment or summarily) in consequence of a contravention of, or failure to comply with, any provision of the companies legislation requiring a return, account or other document to be filed with, delivered or sent, or notice of any matter to be given, to the registrar of companies (whether the contravention or failure is on the person’s own part or on the part of any company). (s. 5)

The maximum period of the order is 15 years under ss, 2 and 4, and 5 years under ss. 3 and 5.

The court may also make an order for a period of up to 15 years where a person has participated in wrongful trading. (s. 10)

== Mandatory disqualification ==
=== By order of the court ===
The court shall make a disqualification order against a person in any case where it is satisfied—

(a) that he is or has been a director of a company which has at any time become insolvent (whether while he was a director or subsequently), and
(b) that his conduct as a director of that company (either taken alone or taken together with his conduct as a director of any other company or companies) makes him unfit to be concerned in the management of a company. (s. 6(1))

A "director" is deemed to include a "shadow director", which is defined as a person in accordance with whose directions or instructions the directors of the company are accustomed to act (but so that a person is not deemed a shadow director by reason only that the directors act on advice given by him in a professional capacity). (s. 9(2) and s. 22(5))

The maximum period for such an order is 15 years, and the minimum period is 2 years. (s. 6(4))

A company becomes insolvent if—

(a) the company goes into liquidation at a time when its assets are insufficient for the payment of its debts and other liabilities and the expenses of the winding up,
(b) an administration order is made in relation to the company, or
(c) an administrative receiver of the company is appointed;

and references to a person’s conduct as a director of any company or companies include, where that company or any of those companies has become insolvent, that person’s conduct in relation to any matter connected with or arising out of the insolvency of that company. (s. 6(3))

=== Standard for assessing unfitness ===
The following factors must be considered in determining whether a director is unfit (s. 9 and schedule 1):

In all cases

- Any misfeasance or breach of any fiduciary or other duty by the director in relation to the company.
- Any misapplication or retention by the director of, or any conduct by the director giving rise to an obligation to account for, any money or other property of the company.
- The extent of the director’s responsibility for the company entering into any transaction liable to be set aside under Part XVI of the Insolvency Act 1986 (provisions against debt avoidance).
- The extent of the director’s responsibility for any failure by the company to comply with any of the following provisions of the Companies Act 1985, namely—

(a) s. 221 (companies to keep accounting records);
(b) s. 222 (where and for how long records to be kept);
(c) s. 288 (register of directors and secretaries);
(d) s. 352 (obligation to keep and enter up register of members);
(e) s. 353 (location of register of members);
(f) s. 363 (duty of company to make annual returns);
(h) ss. 398 and 703D (duty of company to deliver particulars of charges on its property).

- The extent of the director's responsibility for any failure by the directors of the company to comply with—

(a) s. 226 or s. 227 (duty to prepare annual accounts), or
(b) s. 233 (approval and signature of accounts).

Where the company has become insolvent

- The extent of the director’s responsibility for the causes of the company becoming insolvent.
- The extent of the director’s responsibility for any failure by the company to supply any goods or services which have been paid for (in whole or in part).
- The extent of the director’s responsibility for the company entering into any transaction or giving any preference, being a transaction or preference—

(a) liable to be set aside under s. 127 or ss. 238 to 240 of the Insolvency Act 1986, or
(b) challengeable under s. 242 or s. 243 of that act or under any rule of law in Scotland.

- The extent of the director's responsibility for any failure by the directors of the company to comply with s. 98 of IA1986 (duty to call creditors' meeting in creditors' voluntary winding up).
- Any failure by the director to comply with any obligation imposed on him by or under any of the following provisions of IA1986—

(a) s. 22 (company's statement of affairs in administration);
(b) s. 47 (statement of affairs to administrative receiver);
(c) s. 66 (statement of affairs in Scottish receivership);
(d) s. 99 (directors' duty to attend meeting; statement of affairs in creditors' voluntary winding up);
(e) s. 131 (statement of affairs in winding up by the court);
(f) s. 234 (duty of any one with company property to deliver it up);
(g) s. 235 (duty to co-operate with liquidator, etc.).

Assessment is considered to be an objective standard in determining what is ordinarily expected of people fit to be directors of companies. Directors must inform themselves of company affairs and join in with other directors to supervise those affairs. The courts have identified relevant factors for determining the length of the disqualification period:

- a company director should realise that his statutory and fiduciary obligations are personal responsibilities
- the primary purpose of disqualification is to protect the public against the future conduct of companies by persons whose past records as directors of insolvent companies showed them to be a danger to creditors and others
- the period of disqualification must reflect the gravity of the offence
- the period of disqualification may be fixed by starting with an assessment of the correct period to fit the gravity of the conduct, and a discount is then given for mitigating factors
- a wide variety of factors, including the former director's age and state of health, the length of time he has been in jeopardy, whether he has admitted the offence, his general conduct before and after the offence, and the periods of disqualification of his co-directors that may have been ordered by other courts, may be relevant and admissible in determining the appropriate period of disqualification

The courts have also provided guidance as to what constitutes an appropriate length for a disqualification period:

- periods over ten years should be reserved for particularly serious cases, which may include cases where a director who has already had one period of disqualification imposed on him falls to be disqualified yet again.
- six to 10 years should apply for serious cases which do not merit the top category.
- two to five years' disqualification should be applied where, though disqualification is mandatory, the case is, relatively, not very serious.

=== Automatic disqualification ===
The following persons are automatically disqualified:

- undischarged bankrupts, persons subject to a moratorium period under a debt relief order, and persons subject to a bankruptcy restrictions order or a debt relief restrictions order (s. 11)
- those who have failed to make a payment under a county court administration order (s. 12)
- those subject to a disqualification order under corresponding Northern Ireland legislation (s. 12A)

== Provisions ==
=== Repealed enactments ===
Section 23(2) of the act repealed 2 enactments, listed in schedule 4 to the act.

Enactments repealed by section 23(2)
Citation	Short title	Extent of repeal
1985 c. 6	Companies Act 1985	Sections 295 to 299. Section 301. Section 302. Schedule 12. In Schedule 24, the entries relating to sections 295(7) and 302(1).
1985 c. 65	Insolvency Act 1985	Sections 12 to 14. Section 16. Section 18. Section 108(2). Schedule 2. In Schedule 6, paragraphs 1, 2, 7 and 14. In Schedule 9, paragraphs 2 and 3.

=== Subsequent amendments ===
==== Enterprise Act 2002 ====
Effective 20 June 2003, the Enterprise Act 2002 added ss. 9A - 9E to the act, which expand the mandatory disqualification régime to cover the following breaches of competition law under the Competition Act 1998 or the Treaty establishing the European Community:

- agreements preventing, restricting or distorting competition
- abuse of a dominant position

The factors for determining unfitness in this case relate solely to behaviour concerning the breach of competition law, and the other factors listed in Schedule 1 do not apply. Disqualification may be made through an order of the court or through an undertaking.

==== Small Business, Enterprise and Employment Act 2015 ====
In March 2015, the Small Business, Enterprise and Employment Act 2015 received royal assent. On 1 October 2015, part 9 of the 2015 act came into force, which amended the 1986 act to introduce:

- inclusion of relevant foreign offences as grounds for disqualification (s. 104)
- extension of the régime to persons instructing unfit directors of insolvent companies (s. 105)
- revision of the procedure for determining the unfitness of directors and shadow directors (s. 106)
- requirements for official receivers, liquidators, administrators and administrative receivers to report to the Secretary of State on the conduct of each person who was a director of a company on the insolvency date or within the three years before (s. 107)
- provision for compensation orders and undertakings on persons who are subject to disqualification orders or undertakings, where the person's conduct as a director caused loss to one or more creditors during the time he was a director of an insolvent company (s. 110)

== Consequences ==
=== Under the act ===
- where a person acts contrary to a disqualification order, undertaking or automatic disqualification without the leave of the court, he is guilty of an offence, and is subject on indictment to a sentence of up to 2 years in prison and/or a fine, or on summary conviction to a sentence of 6 months and/or a fine at the statutory maximum. (s. 13)
- where a body corporate is convicted of acting contrary to a disqualification order, and it is shown that a person has contributed to the offence through consent, connivance or neglect, both parties are equally liable. (s. 14)
- a person is liable for the debts of a company where he acts contrary to a disqualification order or undertaking, or where he acts or is willing to act on the instructions of another person who is similarly subject to the same. (s. 15)

=== Other effects ===
A person subject to a disqualification order or undertaking will also be disqualified from acting as:

- a charity trustee without permission of the court or the Charity Commission for England and Wales (as the case may be)
- a school governor
- a trustee of an occupational pension scheme without leave from the Pensions Regulator
- a member of a police authority
- a director, trustee or committee member of a registered social landlord
- a member of the Council for Healthcare Regulatory Excellence and various other health commissions and social care bodies

Membership in certain professional bodies may also be affected, and members may be required to notify the fact of such disqualification to the body in question.

== See also ==
- Insolvency Act 1986
- UK insolvency law
