= Preferential Payments in Bankruptcy Amendment Act 1897 =

Act of the Parliament of the United Kingdom

Preferential Payments in Bankruptcy Amendment Act 1897 (Note: Section 1.)
- Act of Parliament
- Parliament of the United Kingdom
- Long title: An Act to amend the Law regarding Preferential Payments in the case of Companies.
- Citation: 60 & 61 Vict. c. 19
- Territorial extent: England and Wales; Ireland; (Note: Section 5.)

Dates
- Royal assent: 15 July 1897
- Commencement: 15 July 1897 (Note: The Acts of Parliament (Commencement) Act 1793.)
- Repealed: 1 April 1909
Other legislation
Repealed by	Companies (Consolidation) Act 1908
Relates to	Preferential Payments in Bankruptcy Act 1888; Preferential Payments in Bankruptcy (Ireland) Act 1889; Companies Act 1929; Companies Act 1948

Status: Repealed

Text of statute as originally enacted

The Preferential Payments in Bankruptcy Amendment Act 1897 (60 & 61 Vict. c. 19) was an act of the Parliament of the United Kingdom, affecting UK insolvency law. It amended the category of "preferential payments" for rates, taxes and wages, to take priority over a floating charge in an insolvent company's assets. The act was passed in broad response to the decision of the House of Lords in Salomon v A Salomon & Co Ltd [1896] UKHL 1, [1897] AC 22.

Section 1 of the Preferential Payments in Bankruptcy Act 1888 (51 & 52 Vict. c. 62) first introduced the concept. It was amended by section 2 of the Preferential Payments in Bankruptcy Amendment Act 1897.

The provisions were re-enacted in the Companies (Consolidation) Act 1908 (8 Edw. 7. c. 69), the Companies Act 1929 (19 & 20 Geo. 5. c. 23) and the Companies Act 1948 (11 & 12 Geo. 6. c. 38).

Its provisions were largely ineffective as a floating charge would invariably crystallise into a fixed charge prior to enforcement. It was not until the Insolvency Act 1986 that the definition of floating charge was expanded to include any charge which was created as a fixed charge (i.e. irrespective of subsequent crystallisation).

== Subsequent developments ==
The whole act was repealed by section 286(1) of, and part I of the sixth schedule to, the Companies (Consolidation) Act 1908 (8 Edw. 7. c. 69), which came into force on 1 April 1909.

== See also ==
- Re Barleycorn Enterprises Ltd [1970] Ch 465
- UK insolvency law
- UK bankruptcy law
- History of bankruptcy law
