= Companies (Consolidation) Act 1908 =

Act of the Parliament of the United Kingdom

Companies (Consolidation) Act 1908 (Note: Section 295.)
- Act of Parliament
- Parliament of the United Kingdom
- Long title: An Act to consolidate the Companies Act, 1862, and the Acts amending it.
- Citation: 8 Edw. 7. c. 69
- Territorial extent: United Kingdom

Dates
- Royal assent: 21 December 1908
- Commencement: 1 April 1909 (Note: Section 296.)
- Repealed: 1 November 1929
Other legislation
Amends	Stannaries Act 1869; Conveyancing (Scotland) Act 1874; Supreme Court of Judicature Act 1875; Supreme Court of Judicature (Ireland) Act 1877; Stannaries Act 1887; Trustee Savings Banks Act 1887; Preferential Payments in Bankruptcy Act 1888; Revenue Act 1889; Preferential Payments in Bankruptcy (Ireland) Act 1889; Limited Partnerships Act 1907
Repeals/revokes	Companies Act 1862; Companies Seals Act 1864; Companies Act 1867; Joint Stock Companies Arrangement Act 1870; Companies Act 1877; Companies Act 1879; Companies Act 1880; Companies (Colonial Registers) Act 1883; Companies Act 1886; Companies (Memorandum of Association) Act 1890; Companies (Winding up) Act 1890; Directors Liability Act 1890; Companies (Winding up) Act 1893; Preferential Payments in Bankruptcy Amendment Act 1897; Companies Act 1898; Companies Act 1900; Companies Act 1907; Companies Act 1908
Amended by	Perjury Act 1911; Companies Act 1913; Forgery Act 1913; Administration of Justice Act 1925; Companies Act 1928
Repealed by	Companies Act 1929

Status: Repealed

Text of statute as originally enacted

The Companies (Consolidation) Act 1908 (8 Edw. 7. c. 69) was an act of the Parliament of the United Kingdom, which was part of the company law of that country and of the Republic of Ireland.

Companies Act 1913 (Note: Section 2.)
- Act of Parliament
- Parliament of the United Kingdom
- Long title: An Act to amend the provisions of the Companies (Consolidation) Act, 1908, with respect to private Companies.
- Citation: 3 & 4 Geo. 5. c. 25
- Territorial extent: United Kingdom

Dates
- Royal assent: 15 August 1913
- Commencement: 15 August 1913 (Note: The Acts of Parliament (Commencement) Act 1793.)
- Repealed: 1 November 1929
Other legislation
Amends	Companies (Consolidation) Act 1908
Repealed by	Companies Act 1929

Status: Repealed

Text of statute as originally enacted

The act was one of the Companies Acts 1908 to 1928. The act was to be construed as one with the Companies Act 1913 (3 & 4 Geo. 5. c. 25).

The act was amended by section 99 of, and the second schedule to the Companies Act 1928 (18 & 19 Geo. 5. c. 45).

The whole act was repealed by section 381(1) of, and part I of the twelfth schedule to, the Companies Act 1929 (19 & 20 Geo. 5. c. 23), subject to sections 381(2) and 382 of that act.

The whole act was repealed, as to the Republic of Ireland, by section 3(1) of, and the twelfth schedule to, the Companies Act, 1963, subject to the savings in section 3 of that act.

The act was retained for the Republic of Ireland by section 2(1) of, and part 4 of schedule 1 to, the Statute Law Revision Act 2007.

As to companies registered under the act, see formerly sections 675 to 677 of the Companies Act 1985 and sections 377 to 379 of the Companies Act 1948 (11 & 12 Geo. 6. c. 38); and sections 625 to 627 of the Companies (Northern Ireland) Order 1986 (SI 1986/1032) (NI 6).

== Provisions ==
=== Repealed enactments ===
Section 286(1) of the act repealed 27 enactments, listed in the first part of the sixth schedule to the act.

Citation	Short title	Description	Extent of Repeal.
25 & 26 Vict. c. 89	Companies Act 1862	The Companies Act, 1862	The whole act.
27 Vict. c. 19	Companies Seals Act 1864	The Companies Seals Act, 1864.	The whole act.
30 & 31 Vict. c. 131	Companies Act 1867	The Companies Act, 1867	The whole act.
32 & 33 Vict. c. 19	Stannaries Act 1869	The Stannaries Act, 1869	Sections twenty-five, twenty-six, and thirty-four.
33 & 34 Vict. c. 104	Joint Stock Companies Arrangement Act 1870	The Joint Stock Companies Arrangement Act, 1870.	The whole act.
37 & 38 Vict. c. 94	Conveyancing (Scotland) Act 1874	Conveyancing (Scotland) Act, 1874.	Section fifty-six.
38 & 39 Vict. c. 77	Supreme Court of Judicature Act 1875	The Supreme Court of Judicature Act, 1875.	Section ten, so far as relates to the winding up of companies.
40 & 41 Vict. c. 26	Companies Act 1877	The Companies Act, 1877	The whole act.
40 & 41 Vict. c. 57	Supreme Court of Judicature Act (Ireland) 1877	The Supreme Court of Judicature (Ireland) Act, 1877.	Subsection (1) of section twenty-eight, so far as relates to the winding up of companies.
42 & 43 Vict. c. 76	Companies Act 1879	The Companies Act, 1879	The whole act.
43 Vict. c. 19	Companies Act 1880	The Companies Act, 1880	The whole act.
46 & 47 Vict. c. 30	Companies (Colonial Registers) Act 1883	The Companies (Colonial Registers) Act. 1883.	The whole act.
49 Vict. c. 23	Companies Act 1886	The Companies Act, 1886	The whole act.
50 & 51 Vict. c. 43	Stannaries Act 1887	The Stannaries Act, 1887	Sections nine and ten: section thirteen from “Upon the winding up ” to the end of the section (being paragraph (2)); and section thirty-one.
50 & 51 Vict. c. 47	Trustee Savings Banks Act 1887	The Trustee Savings Banks Act. 1887.	Section three.
51 & 52 Vict. c. 62	Preferential Payments in Bankruptcy Act 1888	The Preferential Payments in Bankruptcy Act. 1888.	Sections one, two, and three, so far as they relate to companies.
52 & 53 Vict. c. 42	Revenue Act 1889	The Revenue Act, 1889	Section eighteen.
52 & 53 Vict. c. 60	Preferential Payments in Bankruptcy (Ireland) Act 1889	The Preferential Payments in Bankruptcy (Ireland) Act, 1889.	Section four, so far as relates to companies.
53 & 54 Vict. c. 62	Companies (Memorandum of Association) Act 1890	The Companies (Memorandum of Association) Act, 1890.	The whole act,
53 & 54 Vict. c. 63	Companies (Winding up) Act 1890	The Companies (Winding up) Act, 1890.	The whole act.
53 & 54 Vict. c. 64	Directors Liability Act 1890	The Directors Liability Act. 1890.	The whole act.
56 & 57 Vict. c. 58	Companies (Winding-up) Act 1893	The Companies (Winding up) Act, 1893.	The whole act.
60 & 61 Vict. c. 19	Preferential Payments in Bankruptcy Amendment Act 1897	The Preferential Payments in Bankruptcy Amendment Act, 1897.	The whole act.
61 & 62 Vict. c. 26	Companies Act 1898	The Companies Act. 1898	The whole act.
63 & 64 Vict. c. 48	Companies Act 1900	The Companies Act, 1900	The whole act,
7 Edw. 7. c. 24	Limited Partnerships Act 1907	The Limited Partnerships Act, 1907.	Subsection (4) of section six.
7 Edw. 7. c. 50	Companies Act 1907	The Companies Act, 1907	The whole act,
8 Edw. 7. c. 12	Companies Act 1908	The Companies Act, 1908	The whole act.

== Section 18 ==
Section 18(3) was inserted by section 4(c) of the Companies Act 1928.

== Section 26 ==
Section 26(3) was substituted by section 10(1) of the Companies Act 1928.

== Section 30 ==
Section 30(3) was substituted by section 9(b) of the Companies Act 1928.

== Section 34 ==
This section was substituted by section 10(1) of the Companies Act 1928.

== Section 38 ==
The words from "(i) with intent to defraud," to "altered or," in section 38(1) were repealed by section 20 of, and Part 1 of the schedule to, the Forgery Act 1913 (3 & 4 Geo. 5. c. 27) .

Section 38(2) was repealed by section 20 of, and part 1 of the schedule to, the Forgery Act 1913.

== Section 40 ==
This section was repealed by sections 19(3) and 118(3) of, and the third schedule to, the Companies Act 1928.

== Section 41 ==
Section 41(3) was repealed by sections 12(b) and 118(3) of, and the third schedule to, the Companies Act 1928.

== Section 42 ==
This section was substituted by section 14 of the Companies Act 1928.

== Section 44 ==
Section 44(1A) was inserted by section 15(b) of the Companies Act 1928.

== Section 45 ==
This section was repealed by section 118(3) of, and the third schedule to, the Companies Act 1928.

== Section 48 ==
This section was substituted by section 19(1) of the Companies Act 1928.

== Section 56 ==
This section was repealed by section 118(3) of, and the third schedule to, the Companies Act 1928.

== Section 82 ==
This section was repealed by section 118(3) of, and the third schedule to, the Companies Act 1928.

== Section 84 ==
Section 84(2) was repealed by section 118(3) of, and the third schedule to, the Companies Act 1928.

== Section 85 ==
Section 85(7) was repealed by section 118(3) of, and the third schedule to, the Companies Act 1928.

== Section 109 ==
Section 109(7) was repealed by section 118(3) of, and the third schedule to, the Companies Act 1928.

== Section 114 ==
This section was repealed by section 118(3) of, and the third schedule to, the Companies Act 1928.

== Section 119 ==
This section was repealed by section 118(3) of, and the third schedule to, the Companies Act 1928.

== Section 121 ==
Section 121(2) was repealed by section 118(3) of, and the third schedule to, the Companies Act 1928.

== Section 131 ==
Section 131(1) to (4) and (8) were repealed by section 118(3) of, and the third schedule to, the Companies Act 1928.

== Section 151 ==
Section 151(1)(c) was repealed by section 118(3) of, and the third schedule to, the Companies Act 1928.

== Section 188 ==
This section was repealed by section 118(3) of, and the third schedule to, the Companies Act 1928.

== Section 190 ==
This section was repealed by section 118(3) of, and the third schedule to, the Companies Act 1928.

== Section 198 ==
This section was repealed by section 118(3) of, and the third schedule to, the Companies Act 1928.

== Section 212 ==
Re Parkes Garage (Swadlincote) Ltd [1929] 1 Ch 139 was decided under this section.

== Section 217 ==
This section was repealed by section 118(3) of, and the third schedule to, the Companies Act 1928.

== Section 218 ==
This section was repealed by section 17 of, and the schedule to, the Perjury Act 1911.

== Section 238 ==
The words "and fees" in section 238(1), so far as they related to the High Court, were repealed by section 29(4) of, and the Fifth Schedule to, the Administration of Justice Act 1925.

== Section 274 ==
Section 274(3) was repealed by section 118(3) of, and the third schedule to, the Companies Act 1928.

== Section 281 ==
The words "on conviction on indictment to imprisonment for a term not exceeding two years, with or without hard labour, and" and the words "in either case" were repealed by section 17 of, and the schedule to, the Perjury Act 1911.

== Schedule 2 ==
This Schedule was repealed by section 118(3) of, and the third schedule to, the Companies Act 1928.

== See also ==
- Companies Act

== Bibliography ==
- D G Hemmant. The Companies (Consolidation) Act, 1908. Jordan & Sons. Third Edition. 1909. Fourth Edition. 1910.
  - The Companies Acts, 1908 and 1913. Fifth Edition. 1914.
- L Worthington Evans and F Shewell Cooper. Notes on the Companies (Consolidation) Act, 1908. Charles Knight. 1909. Google
- Herbert William Jordan. A B C Guide to the Companies (Consolidation) Act, 1908. Seventh Edition. 1910.
  - Company Law and Practice: An Alphabetical Guide Thereto. Twelfth Edition. 1915.
- Henry Burton Buckley, Baron Wrenbury. The Law and Practice under the Companies (Consolidation) Act, 1908, and the Limited Partnerships Act, 1907. Ninth Edition. Stevens and Haynes. 1909.
  - The Law and Practice under the Companies Acts. . Stevens. 1924.
- Great Britain - Companies (Consolidation) Act, 1908. Printed for Interstate Commerce Committee. Washington. 1911. Google
- Francis Beaufort Palmer. Company Precedents: for use in relation to Companies subject to the Companies (Consolidation) Act, 1908. Eleventh Edition. Stevens. 1912.
  - Winding Up Forms and Practice.
  - Company Precedents: for use in relation to Companies subject to the Companies Acts, 1908 to 1917. Twelfth Edition. 1920 to 1922.
- The Companies (Consolidation) Act 1908 and the Companies Acts 1913-1917. Seventh Edition. Solicitors Law Stationery Society. 1925.
- Francis Beaufort Palmer. Company Law: A Practical Handbook for Lawyers and Business Men. Stevens & Sons. Eighth Edition. 1910. Tenth Edition. 1916. Eleventh Edition. 1921. Twelfth Edition. 1924.
- Arthur Stiebel. Company Law and Precedents. First Edition. Butterworth & Co. 1912. Second Edition. 1920.
- Topham. Principles of Company Law. Third Edition. 1910. Fourth Edition. 1914.
- William Frederick Hamilton and Percy Tindal-Robertson. Company Law. Third Edition. W R Percival Parker. Canadian Edition. 1911.
- John Ashton Cross. Limited Liability Companies: The Law and Practice with the Cases and Precedents, to which are appended the Companies (Consolidation) Act 1908 . . . Simpkin, Marshall, Hamilton, Kent. 1912. Google.
- "Companies (Consolidation) Act". The Practical Statutes of the Session 1908. Law Times Office. 1909. Pages 647 to 902.
- Aggs. "Companies (Consolidation) Act, 1908". Chitty's Statutes of Practical Utility. Sweet and Maxwell. Sixth Edition. 1911. Volume 2. Pages 524 to 675.
- Halsbury's Statutes of England. (The Complete Statutes of England). First Edition. 1929. Volume 41.
- "Companies under the Companies Act, 1908". Halsbury's Laws of England. First Edition. Butterworth & Co. London. (Agents for Canada: Canada Law Book Company, Toronto). 1910. Volume 5. Part IV. Pages 33 to 611.
- The Yearly County Court Practice 1914.
- Daniell's Chancery Practice. 1914. Volume 2.
- "Companies under the Companies (Consolidation) Act, 1908, and similar Acts". The English and Empire Digest. Title "Companies". Volumes 9 and 10. Part III. 1924. Volume 9. Page 37 onwards. Volume 10. Up to page 1064.
- Jenks. A Digest of English Civil Law. Second Edition. 1921. Volume 1.
- Maconochie and Ballingall. "Company". The Scots Digest . . . 1905-1915. W Green & Son. Edinburgh. 1915. column 161 et seq.
