= Re Barleycorn Enterprises Ltd =

British case on insolvency

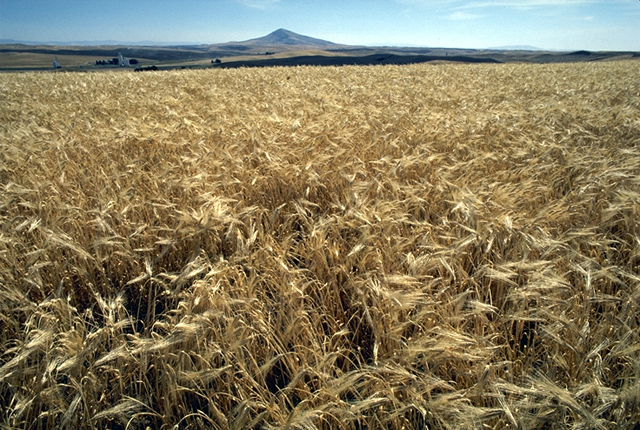
- Court: Court of Appeal of England and Wales
- Full case name: Mathias and Davies (A Firm) v Down
- Decided: 24 February 1970
- Citation: [1970] Ch 465

Court membership
- Judges sitting: Lord Denning MR, Sachs LJ, Phillimore LJ

Keywords
- Winding up, priority, expenses of liquidation

Re Barleycorn Enterprises Ltd [1970] Ch 465 is a UK insolvency law case, concerning the priority of creditors in a company winding up. It was held that fees for liquidation came in priority to preferential claims and floating charges. This was overturned by the House of Lords in Buchler v Talbot, but reinstated by Parliament through an amendment to the Insolvency Act 1986 s 176ZA.

== Facts ==
Barleycorn Enterprises Ltd had been put into compulsory winding up. The directors had employed Cardiff based chartered accountants, Mathias and Davies, to prepare a financial statement for the company. Their fee was £202 10s, and were approved by the official receiver.

However, the company liquidator argued that the accountants should only be paid after preferential creditors and debenture holders. In this case, there was no money left. The judge at first instance, Sir Owen Temple Morris QC, held that the accountants had priority. The liquidator appealed.

== Judgment ==
The Court of Appeal held that the accountants' fees fell under the expenses of liquidation. Tom Denning, Baron Denning gave the first judgment.

The Companies Acts contain provisions regulating the order of payment out of the "assets" of the company. The question is: What does the word "assets" mean in this context? Especially when there is a floating charge.

Two of the material sections go back to the Companies Act 1862, but I will read them as they stand, re-enacted in the Act of 1948 in the same words as in 1862.

Section 267 applies in a compulsory winding up:

"The court may, in the event of the assets being insufficient to satisfy the liabilities, make an order as to the payment out of the assets of the costs, charges and expenses incurred in the winding up in such order of priority as the court thinks just."

Section 309 applies in a voluntary winding up:

"All costs, charges and expenses properly incurred in the winding up, including the remuneration of the liquidator, shall be payable out of the assets of the company in priority to all other claims."

The word "assets" in these sections in 1862 was used as meaning only those free assets which were not the subject of a floating charge. In those days it was held that, when there was a debenture which gave the creditor a floating charge over the property of the company, then, as soon as the charge crystallised on a winding up, the property did not belong to the company but to the debenture holder. It was, therefore, not included in the "assets" of the company and was not available for any of the general costs of the winding up. If the floating charge covered all the property, the debenture holder took it all, subject only to the costs of realising it, e.g., the auctioneer's charges: see In re Marine Mansions Co (1867) LR 4 Eq. 601; In re Oriental Hotels Co (1871) LR 12 Eq 126, 133; and In re Regent's Canal Ironworks Co (1875) 3 Ch D 411, 427, per James LJ.

In 1888 and 1897 Parliament began to use the word "assets" in a different sense. It used the word "assets" so as to include not only the free assets, but also all those assets which were subject to a floating charge. It used the word in this new sense in the statute which created, for the first time, "preferential payments." These were rates, taxes and wages. They took priority over a floating charge. This was done by section 1 of the Preferential Payments in Bankruptcy Act 1888, as amended by section 2 of the Preferential Payments in Bankruptcy Amendment Act 1897. The sections of the Acts of 1888 and 1897 were re-enacted in the Companies (Consolidation) Acts of 1908, 1929 and 1948. I will read them as they now appear in the Act of 1948 and emphasise the significant words:

Section 319 (1) to (4):

"In a winding up there shall be paid, in priority to all other debts - " rates, taxes, wages and so forth.

"(5) The foregoing debts shall - (a) rank equally among themselves and be paid in full, unless the assets are insufficient to meet them, in which case they shall abate in equal proportions; and (b) in the case of a company registered in England, [or Scotland], so far as the assets of the company available for payment of general creditors are insufficient to meet them, have priority over the claims of holders of debentures under any floating charge created by the company, and be paid accordingly out of any property comprised in or subject to that charge; (6) Subject to the retention of such sums as may be necessary for the costs and expenses of the winding up, the foregoing debts shall be discharged forthwith so far as the assets are sufficient to meet them. ..."

Those sections show quite clearly that since 1897 a debenture holder, who holds a floating charge, can no longer sweep up all the company's property for his own benefit. Before he takes any of it, there have to be paid:

(i) "such sums as may be necessary for the costs and expenses of the winding up": see section 319 (6).

(ii) the preferential claims for rates, taxes, wages, and so forth. They are the "foregoing debts" which are given priority over the floating charge: see section 319 (5) (b).

The sections also show that the legislature is using the word "assets" in a different sense from what it did before 1897. When there is a floating charge, the legislature no longer regards the property as belonging wholly to the debenture holder. The property which is subject to the charge forms part of the "assets" of the company which are to be applied first, in payment of the costs and expenses of the winding up, second, in payment of the preferential claims, and only third in payment of the debenture holder.

The word "assets" in sections 267 and 309, which go back to 1862, must, I think, be now interpreted in this new sense and not in the sense in which it was interpreted by the courts before 1897. So without changing the word, we have changed its meaning. It bears a different meaning now from what it did in 1862. This is unusual, but necessary in order to make sense of the legislation as a whole. Sections 267 and 309 now mean that, when there is a floating charge, the "assets" include all the property which is subject to the charge. The costs of the winding up take priority, therefore, over the floating charge.

The word "assets" is used in this new sense in the rule which prescribes the order in which the costs of the winding up are to be borne. The rule goes back to 1902, but it is now rule 195 of the Companies (Winding-Up) Rules 1949. It says this:

"(1) The assets of a company in a winding up by the court ... shall ... be liable to the following payments, which shall be made in the following order of priority, namely:-

"First . - The taxed costs of the petition ...;

"Next . - The remuneration of the special manager (if any).

"Next . - The costs and expenses of any person who makes or concurs in making, the company's statement of affairs. ..."

That rule clearly gives the accountants here a high priority for their fees in the costs of winding up. As part of those costs, they take priority over the preferential payments for rates, taxes and wages, and over the debenture holder.

This view is confirmed by the little book by Mr Topham on Company Law. He wrote it for students, but it is the best of its kind. He said in the 10th ed. (1938), at p. 280:

"Certain 'preferential payments' must be made before payment of other unsecured debts, and, where the security is only a floating charge secured by debentures, these preferential payments must be paid before the debenture holders, but not before the costs of liquidation."

It is also confirmed by the statutory form which contains a note to the effect that the estimates for "unsecured creditors" are subject to the cost of winding up.

We were referred to two cases which were said to be to the contrary, namely, Westminster Corporation and United Travellers Club v Chapman [1916] 1 Ch. 161; and In re Glyncorrwg Colliery Co Ltd [1926] Ch 951 . But the point did not arise for decision in those cases. We have also been referred to some text-books which contained statements to the contrary. I dismiss these as erroneous. I think the order of payment in this winding up is:

- First: the costs of the winding up.
- Second: the preferential payments.
- Third: the debenture holder under the floating charge.
- Fourth: the unsecured creditors.

The fees of these chartered accountants form part of the costs of the winding up. They were approved by the official receiver. They come first and must be paid. I think the county court judge was right in ordering them to be paid. I would dismiss this appeal.

Sachs LJ concurred.

The decision of this court in the present case will, I appreciate, have relatively far-reaching effects and will end a situation in which liquidators have in the past successfully taken a point which can be wholly destitute of merits, as was indeed conceded in the instant case, and one which can enure to the detriment of the public interest when there is a winding up order of the court. None the less, being in full agreement with all that has fallen from my Lord, the Master of the Rolls, in his judgment, I feel it only necessary to add but little.

I would in the first place like to add my tribute to the assistance that has been received from the submissions of counsel. In the end I was convinced by the admirable argument so lucidly expounded by Mr. Pill that there has been no full appreciation, either in any previous judgment or in the standard textbooks normally cited to this court, of the effect of the provisions of sections 2 and 3 of the Preferential Payments in Bankruptcy Amendment Act 1897 (now reproduced in section 319 (5) (b) and section 94 of the Companies Act 1948) when read in conjunction with section 1 (2) and (3) of the Preferential Payments in Bankruptcy Act, 1888 (now reproduced in section 319 (5) (a) and (6) respectively of the Act of 1948). The result of superimposing the Act of 1897 on the Act of 1888 was to make a serious inroad into the rights of debenture holders as previously held to exist by a series of authorities based on a line of reasoning favouring thee holders. That line is perhaps best illustrated in the judgments of Jessel MR and James L in In re David Lloyd & Co (1877) 6 ChD 339, 343, 345 which make plain that in those days judgments on points such as those in issue before this court today were given upon the basis that when a winding-up order took effect the assets of the company changed to being assets of the debenture holders and could not be touched.

When that line of reasoning continued to be followed in judicial decisions after the Act of 1888 and looked like frustrating to some degree the effect of that Act, the legislature stepped in and passed the Act of 1897. The combined effect of the two Acts produces changes greater than appear to have been noticed in the text-books or otherwise despite the clear indication given by footnote 2 to form 22 (Statement of Affairs) reproduced in Buckley on the Companies Acts, 13th ed. (1957), p. 1101.

One practical effect of the changes is that instructions given to accountants to compile a statement of affairs when once sanctioned (rule 56 ) by an official receiver, an officer of the court, cannot, as was here attempted, in future be disowned by the liquidator nor can the burden of compiling such a statement necessarily be transferred to public funds in the event of the directors failing to provide one.

On the basis of those changes as explained by my Lord's judgment, I too would dismiss this appeal.

Phillimore LJ agreed.

I entirely agree, and if I add a very few words, it is in deference to the excellent arguments addressed to us on both sides. Mr. Wootton's submission at the conclusion of his argument was that if there were free assets, that is to say, assets not covered by some floating charge or debenture, then the proper order for payment would be: first, the costs of the winding up; secondly, the preferential debts; and, thirdly, the floating charge. On the other hand if there were no free assets and everything was covered by the floating charge, then the order would be: first, the preferential debts; secondly, the floating charge; and, thirdly, the costs of the winding up - which in practice would mean that whoever did the winding up would not get anything unless he had made some prior bargain. I find it very difficult to defend the logic which would make the order of priority as between costs and preferential debts dependent upon whether or not there was a floating charge. It seems to me that if one compares the words of the various sections, it is quite clear that, at all events, in the Act of 1948 - and that is the Act with which we are dealing - where the word "assets" occurs without qualification, or even the phrase "assets of the company," that must mean all the assets and not merely free assets, that is to say, assets free of any floating charge. It is only really possible to make sense of sections 94, 267, 309 and 319 on that basis. The point is emphasised when one looks at section 319 (5) (b), which is dealing with the position as between the preferred creditors and the debenture holders where there are no free assets to meet the claims of the preferential claimants; and it is provided that in the case of a company registered in England, so far as the "assets of the company available for payment of general creditors" - now, there is a phrase which clearly means free assets - "are insufficient to meet the foregoing debts, they have priority over claims of holders of debentures," and so on. So there it is manifest that where Parliament means to designate those assets which are free of the floating charge, it uses Special words to distinguish the position from that where the simple word "assets" is used, as in the other sections to which I have referred, and in section 319 (6) itself. As I see it, rule 195, which is the rule applying to this case, and form 2, which is provided for under the Companies (Winding-Up) Rules 1949, which are made by virtue of section 267 of the Act, must, where the word "assets" is used, mean the same as in the principal section from which they derived their birth. If that be right, it is perfectly clear that rule 195 requires that the assets of the company should be used to meet these costs in preference to the claims of either preferential creditors or debenture holders. For those reasons I entirely concur with my Lords that this appeal must be dismissed.

== See also ==
- Buchler v Talbot [2004] UKHL 9, [2004] 2 AC 298
- Insolvency Act 1986 s 176ZA
- Re MC Bacon Ltd (No 2) [1991] Ch 127
