= Re MC Bacon Ltd (No 2) =

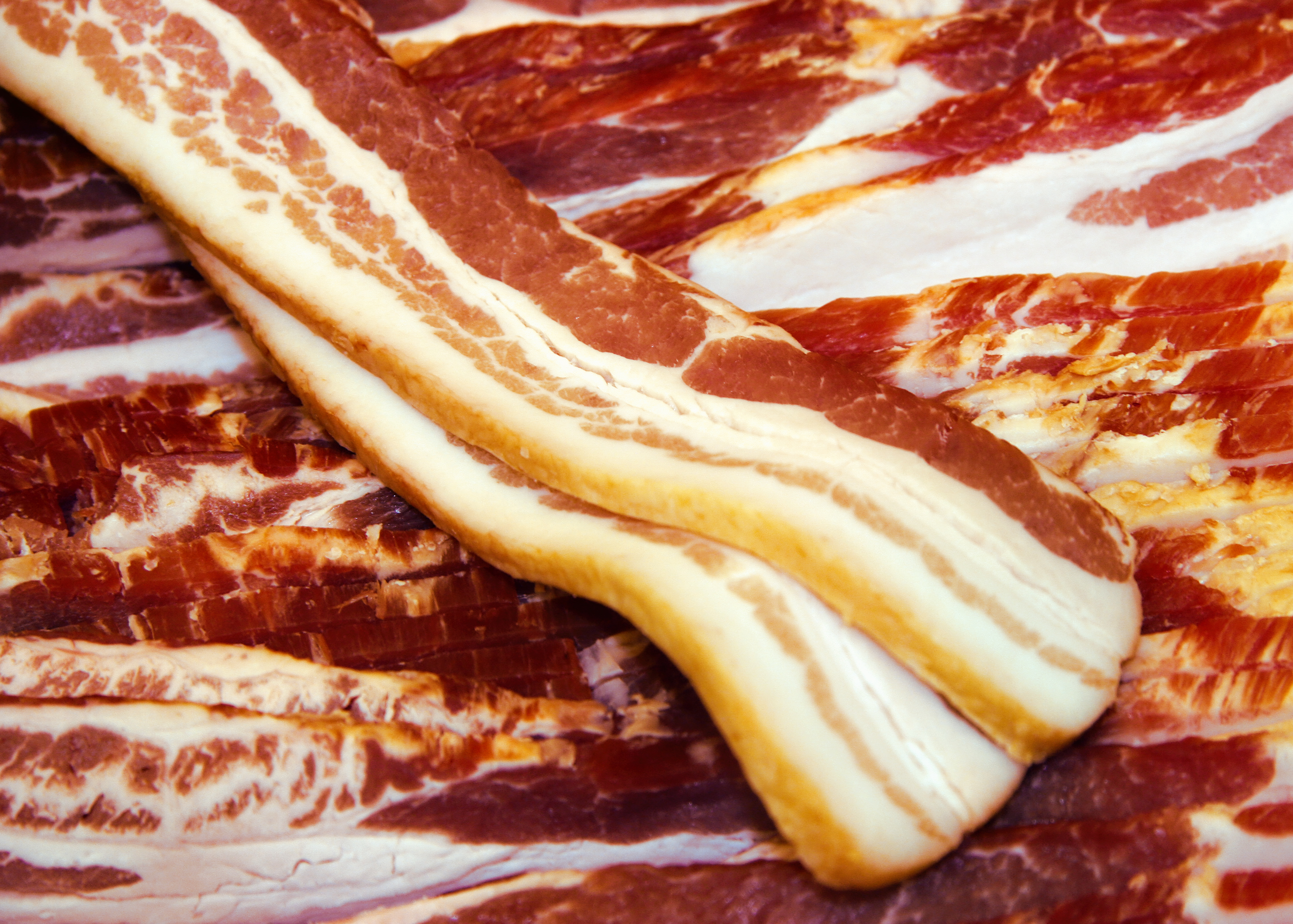
- Court: High Court
- Full case name: In re MC Bacon Ltd
- Decided: 5 April 1990
- Citations: [1991] Ch 127 [1990] BCLC 324

Case opinions
- Millett J

Keywords
- Voidable preference; undervalue transaction; wrongful trading

Re MC Bacon Ltd [1991] Ch 127 is a UK insolvency law case relating specifically to the recovery the legal costs of the liquidator in relation to an application to set aside a floating charge as an unfair preference.

The court held that because the right of action was vested in the liquidator (rather than the company itself) then those claims were not claims for realising or getting in the assets of the company, and therefore were not expenses of the liquidation. Accordingly, they were not recoverable under the preferential regime reserved for expenses of the liquidation.

The court also gave useful guidance in the discussion of the proper application and context of applications by liquidators in relation to preferences and claims relating to wrongful trading.

== Facts ==
MC Bacon Ltd was an importer of bacon which went into insolvent liquidation. Before going into liquidation the company had granted a debenture containing a floating charge in favour of its bank. At the time the company was already insolvent. The liquidator brought proceedings claiming that the debenture was either a voidable preference or a transaction at an undervalue. It also brought a wrongful trading claim against the bank as a shadow director, but that claim was abandoned during the course of trial.

The bank had applied to have the entire claim struck out as disclosing no reasonable cause of action. That strike out application came before Knox J. He declined to strike out the claim, and it proceeded to trial before Millet J. The hearing before Millet J lasted 17 days who dismissed all of the liquidator's claims. That decision was separately reported as Re MC Bacon Ltd (No 1) [1990] BCC 78.

The liquidator then sought an order for his costs. He accepted that he had lost the case, but he contended that the action had been properly brought (evidenced not least by the fact that it had survived a claim to strike it out). Accordingly, he argued that he was entitled to have his costs paid out of the assets subject to the floating charge under the Insolvency Act 1986 under section 115 or section 175(2)(a). The liquidator relied heavily upon Re Barleycorn Enterprises Ltd [1970] Ch 465 (now overruled).

== Judgment ==
Millett J recounted the history of the litigation. He noted that the liquidator claimed those costs not as a matter of discretion, but as of right. In Re Barleycorn Enterprises Ltd it was held that assets subject to a floating charge were assets of the company for the purposes of determining the liquidator's right to be reimbursed their expense.

=== Primary issues ===
The court proceeded on the assumption that the claims were properly brought, although it noted that this was a slightly shaky assumption. Although the claims had survived a strike-out and an application for indemnity costs, the claims had failed, and a key part had been abandoned midway through trial. Millett J noted in particular that the undervalue claim was doomed from the very outset.

The crucial part of the judgment was whether the proceedings could properly be called "expenses of the winding up". The court noted that under rule 4.218(1) of the Insolvency Rules 1986 legal costs and expenses will be expenses of the winding up if they are "expenses properly chargeable or incurred by ... the liquidator in preserving, realising or getting in any of the assets of the company." However, in the instant case, the court held:

The proceedings were not brought by or on behalf of the company nor were they brought in order to recover assets belonging to the company at the date of the winding up. All such assets were charged to the bank and any claim to recover them was vested in the bank. The proceedings were brought (i) to set aside the bank's charge, fixed as well as floating, as a voidable preference, and (ii) to obtain compensation for wrongful trading by way of an order for contribution to the assets of the company. Neither claim could have been made by the company itself.

=== Obiter dictum ===
Although that was sufficient to dispose of the application, the court went on to consider the nature of the remedies open to the liquidator, and handed down the obiter dictum for which the case is best known.

The court noted that any sums recovered by the liquidator by way of unfair preference is not owned by the company and is not caught as after acquired property by the floating charge. Instead it is held by the liquidator on statutory trusts for the unsecured creditors, see Re Yagerphone Ltd [1935] Ch 392.

Millett J further considered whether or not Re Barleycorn Enterprises Ltd was correct to hold that assets which are subject to a floating charge should be treated as assets available to the liquidator in relation to expense claims. He expressed significant reservations as to the correctness of that position. This would essentially presage a later decision of the House of Lords where, sitting as Lord Millett, he would overrule Re Barleycorn.

== Significance ==
The decision was cited with approval and followed by the Court of Appeal in Re Oasis Merchandising Services Ltd [1998] Ch 170. The doubts expressed by Millett J about Re Barleycorn would be reinforced when he sat as part of the court that overruled it in Buchler v Talbot [2004] UKHL 9.

The decision was also followed by the Court of Appeal in Re Floor Fourteen [2001] 3 All ER 499. However following that decision the position was reversed in part by statute, and where the creditors committee sanctions the legal proceedings, those will be treated as expenses in the winding up.

== See also ==
- UK insolvency law
- Re Agriplant Services Ltd [1997] 2 BCLC 598
