= Brooks v Armstrong =

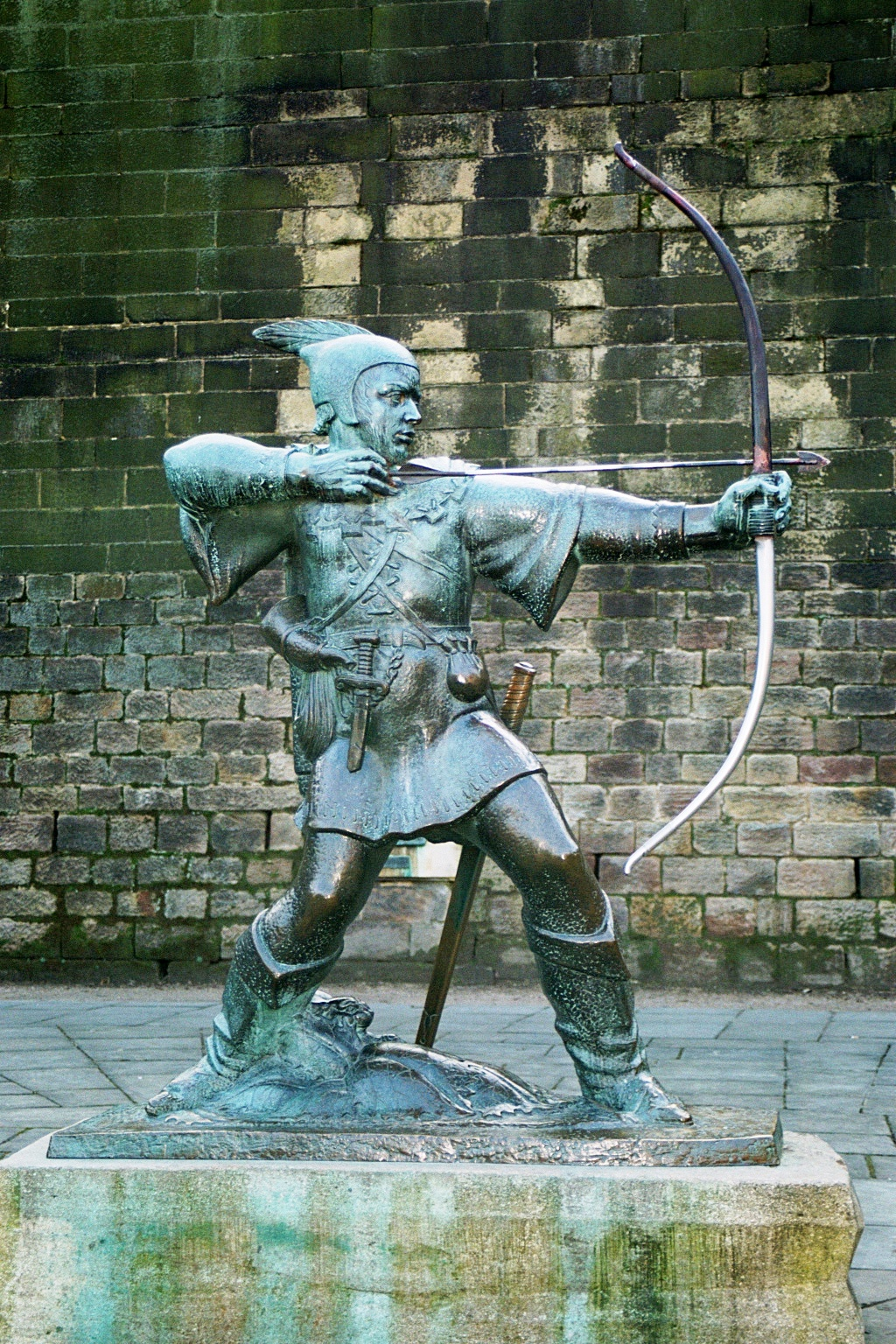
- Court: High Court
- Full case name: Philip Anthony Brooks and Julie Elizabeth Willetts (Joint Liquidators of Robin Hood Centre Plc) v Keiron Armstrong and Ian Walker
- Decided: 31 July 2015
- Citations: [2016] EWHC 2893 (Ch), [2016] All ER (D) 117 (Nov)

Court membership
- Judge sitting: Registrar Jones

Keywords
- Wrongful trading; Misfeasance

Brooks v Armstrong [2016] EWHC 2893 (Ch), [2016] All ER (D) 117 (Nov) is a UK insolvency law case on wrongful trading under section 214 of the Insolvency Act 1986.

The original decision by Registrar Jones was widely reported ([2015] EWHC 2893 (Ch), [2015] BCC 661, [2015] All ER (D) 45 (Aug)) in relation to the extensive guidance and consideration given to the issues. That decision was then partly overturned on appeal by David Foxton QC sitting as a Deputy High Court judge. The liquidators have now applied for further permission to appeal to the Court of Appeal.

== Facts ==
From July 1998 Robin Hood Centre plc ("the company") engaged in the business of a Robin Hood themed tourist attraction in Nottinghamshire. The company went into creditors' voluntary liquidation on 6 February 2009. The liquidators brought proceedings against the directors of the company for misfeasance and wrongful trading.

Although the company accounts showed a surplus of assets for the 12 years prior to liquidation, the liquidators argued that the companies were in fact balance-sheet insolvent during the relevant period due to mis-stating of depreciation on the company accounts.

== First instance judgment ==
In a detailed and comprehensive judgment Registrar Jones reviewed the existing authorities and law relating to wrongful trading. He held that there were three principle conditions to a finding of wrongful trading:

- the company must have gone into liquidation with insufficient assets to meets the claims of its creditors and the costs of winding-up (the "insolvency condition")
- at some time before the commencement of winding-up the directors knew or ought to have concluded that there was no prospect of avoiding insolvent liquidation (the "knowledge condition")
- the director (which includes a "shadow director") failed to take "every step" to minimise loss to the company's creditors (the "minimising loss defence").

=== Burden of proof ===
The court held that the burden of proof was on the liquidator to establish (a) the insolvency condition and (b) the knowledge condition. But having established that, the burden of proof then switched to the directors to establish the minimising loss defence, if applicable. The court rejected academic sources which suggested that the burden of proof was also on the liquidators to disprove the defence, and followed the High Court decision of Ms Lesley Anderson QC in Re Idessa (UK) Ltd [2011] EWHC 804 (Ch), [2012] BCC 315 at [113].

The court also followed Re Idessa in holding that "every step" was a stricter test than "every reasonable step", which Parliament had impliedly rejected.

=== Date of knowledge ===
The court further held that the liquidators only need prove that the directors knew insolvent litigation was unavoidable prior to the commencement of winding-up. It was not necessary to prove that they had this knowledge on any particular date (following Re Continental Assurance Co of London plc [2001] BPIR 733). However the directors did have a right to know the case that they had to meet, and so the liquidators would not be able to claim a different date period at trial to the one identified in pleadings and evidence in support.

=== Applying the tests ===
The liquidators had to establishing insolvency on the balance of probabilities. It was sufficient to show that there was insufficiency of assets and that the company would inevitably run out of assets under the "Eurosail test" (BNY Corporate Trustees Services Ltd v Eurosail-UK 2007-3BL plc [2013] UKSC 28). Accordingly, it was not necessary for the company to actually be insolvent at the time - merely that future insolvency was inevitable.

However, there was no general prohibition on companies trading whilst they were insolvent if they legitimately believed that they could trade at a profit and thereby minimise loss to creditors. The law must leave room for cases where directors genuinely thought they could trade out of their difficulties, even if they turned out to be wrong.

The court also confirmed that it must be careful not to approach the knowledge condition with the benefit of hindsight. Directors would often be faced with decisions to which there was no obvious right or wrong answer. But the policy behind section 214 of the Insolvency Act 1986 was against "conduct ranging from the irresponsible to the unreasonable". This might be positive conduct, but it might also be directors wilfully shutting their eyes.

=== Standard of conduct ===
The conduct of the directors was to be tested against the general level of knowledge, skill and experience reasonably expected of a director.

=== Minimising loss defence ===
What would constitute taking "every step" to minimise loss to creditors would depend upon the facts of each case. But the court identified a number of factors to be considered:

- whether the directors ensured that the accounting records were kept up to date, particularly budget and cash-flow forecasts
- preparing business plans and business reviews which included steps to minimise losses (i.e. cutting costs)
- keeping creditors informed and seeking agreements to address debt and supply
- regular monitoring of trade and financial positions, both informally and at board meetings
- asking and assessing if losses were being minimised
- ensuring adequate capitalisation
- obtaining professional legal and financial advice
- considering alternative insolvency and restructuring remedies

=== Application ===
The court held that its jurisdiction in relation to an application under section 214 was not fettered. The compensation to be awarded was designed to recoup losses to the company caused by the wrongful trading. The maximum award would therefore normally be the amount by which the company's assets had been depleted in consequence of the wrongful trading. However although the law did not impose a specific test for causation, there must be more than a "but for" nexus between the wrongful trading and the depletion. Allowance must be given for losses that were not caused by the directors' actions.

The assessment should be based upon bridging the gap between what the position would have been if the company had been put into a hypothetical liquidation at the last point when it was reasonable to do so, against the actual position. Where there were two or more defendants who are shared culpability, that award would be joint and several.

The court held on the facts of the case, there were no grounds for making any separate award for misfeasance.

=== Commentary ===
Most commentators responded positively to the decision, noting the clarity with which it set out the relevant constituent elements of liability, and provided important clarification of the issues relating to burden of proof.

== Appeal ==
Upon appeal the decision was reversed in part by David Foxton QC, sitting as a Deputy High Court judge.

He held that notwithstanding the missing financial information, it was nevertheless possible for the court to perform "increase in net deficiency" calculations. In this case the liquidators had been able to do so, although Registrar Jones had felt their calculations were deficient. In this case the facts were distinguishable from Re Purpoint and Re Kudos Business Solutions as the directors had not failed to keep records, but simply that certain records had not been collected by the liquidators (the liquidators argued that the directors had breached their duty to produce the company's papers and were responsible for their absence, but no finding of fact was made in that regard).

Foxton QC held that the tribunal below had applied the correct test when assessing Mr Armstrong's conduct, and that it was entitled to take into account those matters in assessing the director's knowledge as at October 2006.

He noted that challenges to the company's supposed profitability were not raised at trial, and there was no certainty that if changes had had to be made to the VAT scheme that this would have precluded the company from continuing to operate profitably.

The court was satisfied that there was no inconsistency between finding that the assets of the company would have fetched little (or possibly nothing) upon a sale in liquidation, but that the assets could still continue to generate positive cash flow within the business as a going concern. It was noteworthy that the negative effects of asset depreciation had already occurred by 31 January 2007, and this was not worsened through continued use.

The honesty of the directors was one of a number of factors which the Registrar referred to, and he was entitled to consider those as part of his balancing exercise when assessing compensation.

The deputy judge was persuaded that the Registrar had erred in trying to apply an analysis which had not in fact been advanced by either litigant, and which had not been the subject of counsels' submissions at trial. The parties would have been entitled to raise legitimate objections to this approach, either on the basis that there was not sufficient evidence on key issues, or alternatively, if that analysis was followed through to a proper conclusion then there would arguably have been no compensation payable.

== See also ==
- UK company law
- UK insolvency law
