= Companies Act =

Stock short title used in legislation

Companies Act (with its variations) is a stock short title used for legislation in Botswana, Hong Kong, Ireland, India, Kenya, Malaysia, New Zealand, South Africa and the United Kingdom in relation to company law. The Bill for an Act with this short title will usually have been known as a Companies Bill during its passage through Parliament.

Companies Acts may be a generic name either for legislation bearing that short title or for all legislation which relates to company law.

== List ==
=== Botswana ===
- The Companies Act 2007

=== Canada ===
==== Nova Scotia ====
- Companies Act, RSNS 1989, c 81 (PDF) (Act). Nova Scotia. 1989.

=== India ===
- The Indian Companies Act, 1882 (No. 6 of 1882)
- The Indian Companies Act, 1913 (No. 7 of 1913)
- The Companies Act, 1956 (No. 1 of 1956)
- The Companies Act, 2013 (No. 18 of 2013)

=== Kenya ===
- The Companies Act 1962 (Cap 486)
- The Companies Act 2015

=== Malaysia ===
- Companies Act 1965
- Companies Act 2016

=== New Zealand ===
- Companies Act 1993 (originally Joint Stock Companies Act 1860)

=== Singapore ===
- The Companies Act 1967 (Cap 50)

=== Brunei ===
- The Companies Act 1984

=== South Africa ===
- The Companies Act, 1973
- The Companies Act, 2008

=== United Kingdom ===
- The Royal Exchange and London Assurance Corporation Act 1719 (6 Geo. 3. c. 18) or Bubble Act
- The Trading Companies Act 1834 (4 & 5 Will. 4. c. 94)
- The Chartered Companies Act 1837 (7 Will. 4 & 1 Vict. c. 73)
- The Joint Stock Companies Act 1844 (7 & 8 Vict. c. 110)
- The Companies Clauses Consolidation Act 1845 (8 & 9 Vict. c. 16)
- The Limited Liability Act 1855 (18 & 19 Vict. c. 133)
- The Joint Stock Companies Act 1856 (19 & 20 Vict. c. 47)
- The Companies Act 1862 (25 & 26 Vict. c. 89)
- The Companies Seals Act 1864 (27 & 28 Vict. c. 19)
- The Companies Clauses Act 1863 (26 & 27 Vict. c. 118)
- The Railway Companies Act 1867 (30 & 31 Vict. c. 127)
- The Companies Act 1867 (30 & 31 Vict. c. 131)
- The Companies Clauses Act 1869 (32 & 33 Vict. c. 48)
- The Joint Stock Companies Arrangement Act 1870 (33 & 34 Vict. c. 104)
- The Companies Act 1877 (40 & 41 Vict. c. 26)
- The Companies Act 1879 (42 & 43 Vict. c. 76)
- The Companies Act 1880 (43 Vict. c. 19)
- The Companies (Colonial Registers) Act 1883 (46 & 47 Vict. c. 30)
- The Chartered Companies Act 1884 (47 & 48 Vict. c. 56)
- The Companies Act 1886 (49 & 50 Vict. c. 23)
- The Companies Clauses Consolidation Act 1888 (51 & 52 Vict. c. 48)
- The Companies Clauses Consolidation Act 1889 (52 & 53 Vict. c. 37)
- The Companies (Memorandum of Association) Act 1890 (53 & 54 Vict. c. 62)
- The Companies (Winding-up) Act 1890 (53 & 54 Vict. c. 63)
- The Directors Liability Act 1890 (53 & 54 Vict. c. 64)
- The Companies (Winding-up) Act 1893 (56 & 57 Vict. c. 58)
- The Life Assurance Companies (Payment into Court) Act 1896 (59 & 60 Vict. c. 8)
- The Companies Act 1907 (7 Edw. 7. c. 50)
- The Companies (Consolidation) Act 1908 (8 Edw. 7. c. 69) (repealed)
- The Railway Companies (Accounts and Returns) Act 1911 (1 & 2 Geo. 5. c. 34)
- The Companies Act 1913 (3 & 4 Geo. 5. c. 25) (repealed)
- The Statutory Companies (Redeemable Stock) Act 1915 (5 & 6 Geo. 5. c. 44)
- The Companies Act 1928 (18 & 19 Geo. 5. c. 45)
- The Companies Act 1929 (19 & 20 Geo. 5. c. 23)
- The Companies Act 1947 (10 & 11 Geo. 6. c. 47)
- The Companies Act 1948 (11 & 12 Geo. 6. c. 38)
- The Insurance Companies Act 1958 (6 & 7 Eliz. 2. c. 72) (repealed)
- The Companies Act 1967 (c. 81) (repealed)
- The Insurance Companies Amendment Act 1973 (c. 58)
- The Insurance Companies Act 1974 (c. 49) (repealed)
- The Companies Act 1976 (c. 69) (repealed)
- The Companies Act 1980 (c. 22) (repealed)
- The Insurance Companies Act 1980 (c. 25)
- The Insurance Companies Act 1981 (c. 31) (repealed)
- The Insurance Companies Act 1982 (c. 50) (repealed)
- The Companies Act 1985 (c. 6)
- The Companies Consolidation (Consequential Provisions) Act 1985 (c. 9)
- The Companies Act 1989 (c. 40)
- The Statutory Water Companies Act 1991 (c. 58) (repealed)
- The Insurance Companies (Reserves) Act 1995 (c. 29) (repealed)
- The Companies (Audit, Investigations and Community Enterprise) Act 2004 (c. 27)
- The Companies Act 2006 (c. 46)

The Companies Acts 1862 to 1893 is the collective title of the Companies Act 1862, the Companies Seals Act 1864, the Companies Act 1867, the Joint Stock Companies Arrangement Act 1870, the Companies Act 1877, the Companies Act 1879, the Companies Act 1880, the Companies (Colonial Registers) Act 1883, the Companies Act 1886, the Companies (Memorandum of Association) Act 1890, the Companies (Winding-up) Act 1890, the Directors Liability Act 1890 and the Companies (Winding-up) Act 1893.

The Companies Acts 1948 to 1976 was the collective title of the Companies Act 1948, Parts I and III of the Companies Act 1967, the Companies (Floating Charges and Receivers) (Scotland) Act 1972, section 9 of the European Communities Act 1972, sections 1 to 4 of the Stock Exchange (Completion of Bargains) Act 1976, section 9 of the Insolvency Act 1976, and the Companies Act 1976.

The Companies Acts 1948 to 1980 was the collective title of the Companies Act 1948, Parts I and III of the Companies Act 1967, the Companies (Floating Charges and Receivers) (Scotland) Act 1972, section 9 of the European Communities Act 1972, sections 1 to 4 of the Stock Exchange (Completion of Bargains) Act 1976, section 9 of the Insolvency Act 1976, the Companies Act 1976, and the Companies Act 1980.

The Companies Clauses Acts 1845 to 1889 is the collective title of the Companies Clauses Consolidation Act 1845, the Companies Clauses Act 1863, the Companies Clauses Act 1869, the Companies Clauses Consolidation Act 1888 and the Companies Clauses Consolidation Act 1889.

The Life Assurance Companies Acts 1870 to 1872 was the collective title of the following Acts:

- The Life Assurance Companies Act 1870 (33 & 34 Vict. c. 61)
- The Life Assurance Companies Act 1871 (34 & 35 Vict. c. 58)
- The Life Assurance Companies Act 1872 (35 & 36 Vict. c. 41)

==== Scotland ====
- The Companies Clauses Consolidation (Scotland) Act 1845 (8 & 9 Vict. c. 17)
- The Railway Companies (Scotland) Act 1867 (30 & 31 Vict. c. 126)
- The Companies (Floating Charges) (Scotland) Act 1961 (9 & 10 Eliz. 2. c. 46)

==== Northern Ireland ====
- The Companies Act (Northern Ireland) 1960 (c. 22 (NI))
- The Insurance Companies (Northern Ireland) Act 1968 (c. 6 (NI))
- The Open-Ended Investment Companies Act (Northern Ireland) 2002 (c. 13)

===== Companies Order =====
A number of Orders in Council with this title (or some variation on it) have been passed. The change in nomenclature is due to the demise of the Parliament of Northern Ireland and the imposition of direct rule. These orders are considered to be primary legislation.

- The Companies (Northern Ireland) Order 1986 (SI 1986/1032 (N.I.6))
- The Companies Consolidation (Consequential Provisions) (Northern Ireland) Order 1986 (SI 1986/1035 (N.I. 9))
- The Companies (Northern Ireland) Order 1989 (SI 1989/2404 (N.I.18))
- The Companies (Northern Ireland) Order 1990 (SI 1990/593 (N.I.5))
- The Companies (No. 2) (Northern Ireland) Order 1990 (SI 1990/1504 (N.I.10))
- The Companies (Audit, Investigations and Community Enterprise) (Northern Ireland) Order 2005 (SI 2005/1967 (N.I.17))

== See also ==
- List of short titles
