= Re MC Bacon =

Re MC Bacon may refer to either of two reported judgments of Millett J

- Re MC Bacon Ltd (No 1) [1990] BCLC 324
- Re MC Bacon Ltd (No 2) [1991] Ch 127
