= Companies Act 1928 =

Act of the Parliament of the United Kingdom

Companies Act 1928 (Note: Section 118(1).)
- Act of Parliament
- Parliament of the United Kingdom
- Long title: An Act to amend the Companies Acts, 1909 to 1917, and for purposes connected therewith.
- Citation: 18 & 19 Geo. 5. c. 45
- Territorial extent: England and Wales; Scotland; Northern Ireland (in part); (Note: Section 117.)

Dates
- Royal assent: 3 August 1929
- Commencement: 3 August 1929 (section 92); various; (Note: Section 118(4).)
- Repealed: England and Wales and Scotland: 1 November 1929; Northern Ireland:
Other legislation
Repeals/revokes	Companies (Foreign Interests) Act 1917
Repealed by	England and Wales and Scotland: Companies Act 1929; Northern Ireland: Companies Act (Northern Ireland) 1932

Status: Repealed

Text of statute as originally enacted

The Companies Act 1928 (18 & 19 Geo. 5. c. 45) was an act of the Parliament of the United Kingdom, which regulated UK company law.

== Provisions ==
It introduced the power of the court to make a disqualification order prohibiting a person from being concerned in the management of a company was introduced by section 75. This was subsequently consolidated as section 275 of the Companies Act 1929 and based on the recommendation of the Report of the Company Law Amendment Committee (1925-1926) under the chairmanship of Mr Wilfrid Greene KC (Cmd 2657). Application for an order was to the court having jurisdiction to wind up the company and could be made by the official receiver or the liquidator or any creditor or contributory of the company. Except where there had been a conviction the power was limited to cases where it appeared in the course of a winding up that any business of the company had been carried on with intent to defraud and the maximum period for which a disqualification order could be made was five years. The power to make such an order was discretionary. The grounds upon which a disqualification order could be made were later extended by section 33 of the Companies Act 1947 (subsequently consolidated as section 188 of the Companies Act 1948) following the Report of the Committee on Company Law Amendment (1945) under the chairmanship of Cohen J (Cmd 6659).

See now the Company Directors Disqualification Act 1986.

== See also ==
- Companies Act
