= Re Yagerphone Ltd =

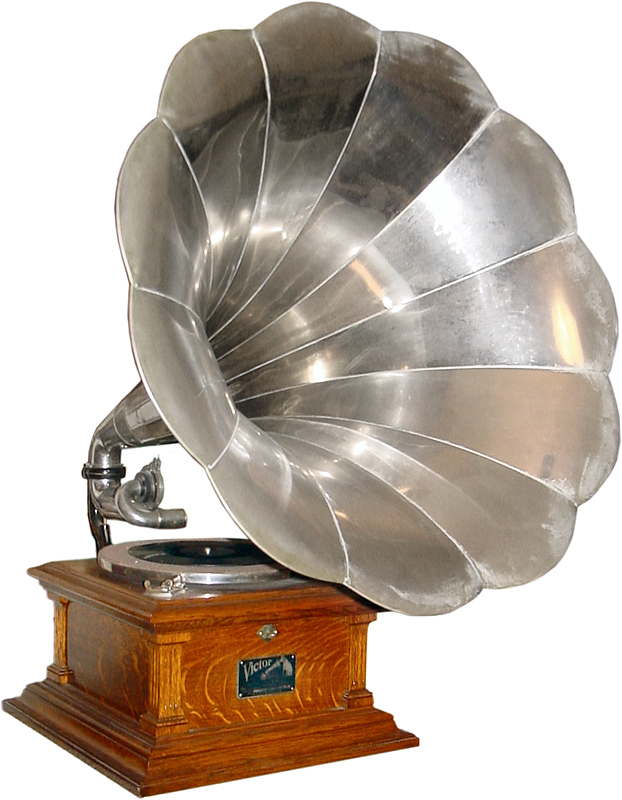
- A yagerphone was a type of portable phonograph
- Court: High Court
- Citation: [1935] 1 Ch 392

Court membership
- Judge sitting: Bennett J

Keywords
- Unfair preference, after-acquired property

Re Yagerphone Ltd [1935] 1 Ch 392 was a United Kingdom insolvency law decision relating to unfair preferences and the proceeds of any claims by a liquidator for unfair preferences, and in particular determining the priority of claims between the general body of creditors and the holder of a floating charge.

The case held that because the power to challenge a transaction as an unfair preference was a statutory right vested in the liquidator alone, the proceeds of any action were not "property of the company" and as such they were not caught be a floating charge which was expressed to include after acquired property (distinguishing Re Anglo-Austrian Printing & Publishing Union [1895] 2 Ch 891). Bennett J held that the proceeds were impressed by a statutory trust for the general body of creditors.

== Facts ==
On 14 January 1933 the company granted a debenture which contained an all-assets floating charge in favour of H. Yager (London) Limited as chargee. The debenture contained a fairly standard provision that the charge would also attach to any after-acquired property of the company. Pursuant to the debenture the chargee advanced the sume of £200 to the company.

Three days later, on 17 January 1933 the company made a payment of £240, 11 s, 6 d to a creditor (who is not named in the report).

On 31 March 1933 the company's members pass a resolution to put the company into voluntary liquidation. The liquidators then sought to challenge the payment to the creditor as an unfair preference under section 265 of the Companies Act 1929 (which incorporated the unfair preference regime from section 44 of the Bankruptcy Act 1914). In the December 1933 the creditor repaid the sums to the liquidator.

The debenture holder then contested that those sums were caught by the debenture, and should be paid to the debenture holder in preference to the general body of creditors.

== Decision ==
The decision was described as a "short ex tempore judgment". The report of the case in the law reports is only slightly longer than a page, although that report does omit the recitation of the facts from the oral judgment.

Bennett J held that the sums did not fall within security created by the debenture. Although initially, the judgment appears to indicate that this is because the floating charge crystallised before the sum became the property of the company, later in the judgment he clarified:

The right to recover a sum of money from a creditor who has been preferred is conferred for the purpose of benefiting the general body of creditors, and I think Mr. Montgomery White was right when he said that the sum of money when recovered by the liquidators by virtue of s. 265 of the Companies Act, 1929, and s. 44 of the Bankruptcy Act, 1914, did not become part of the general assets of Yagerphone, Ld., but was a sum of money received by the liquidators impressed in their hands with a trust for those creditors amongst whom they had to distribute the assets of the company.

The headnote indicates that the judgment "distinguishes" (i.e. did not follow) earlier cases such as Ex Parte Cooper (1875) LR 10 Ch 510 and Willmott v London Celluloid Co (1886) 34 Ch D 147. However those decisions are barely referred to in the judgment at all, and it is not clear that they relate to the same point in any event.

== Authority ==
Despite being a short ex tempore first instance decision, Re Yagerphone has never seriously been doubted. It has been followed in Re MC Bacon Ltd (No 2) [1991] Ch 127 and Re Oasis Merchandising Services Ltd [1998] Ch 170 amongst others.
