= Buchler v Talbot =

UK insolvency law case

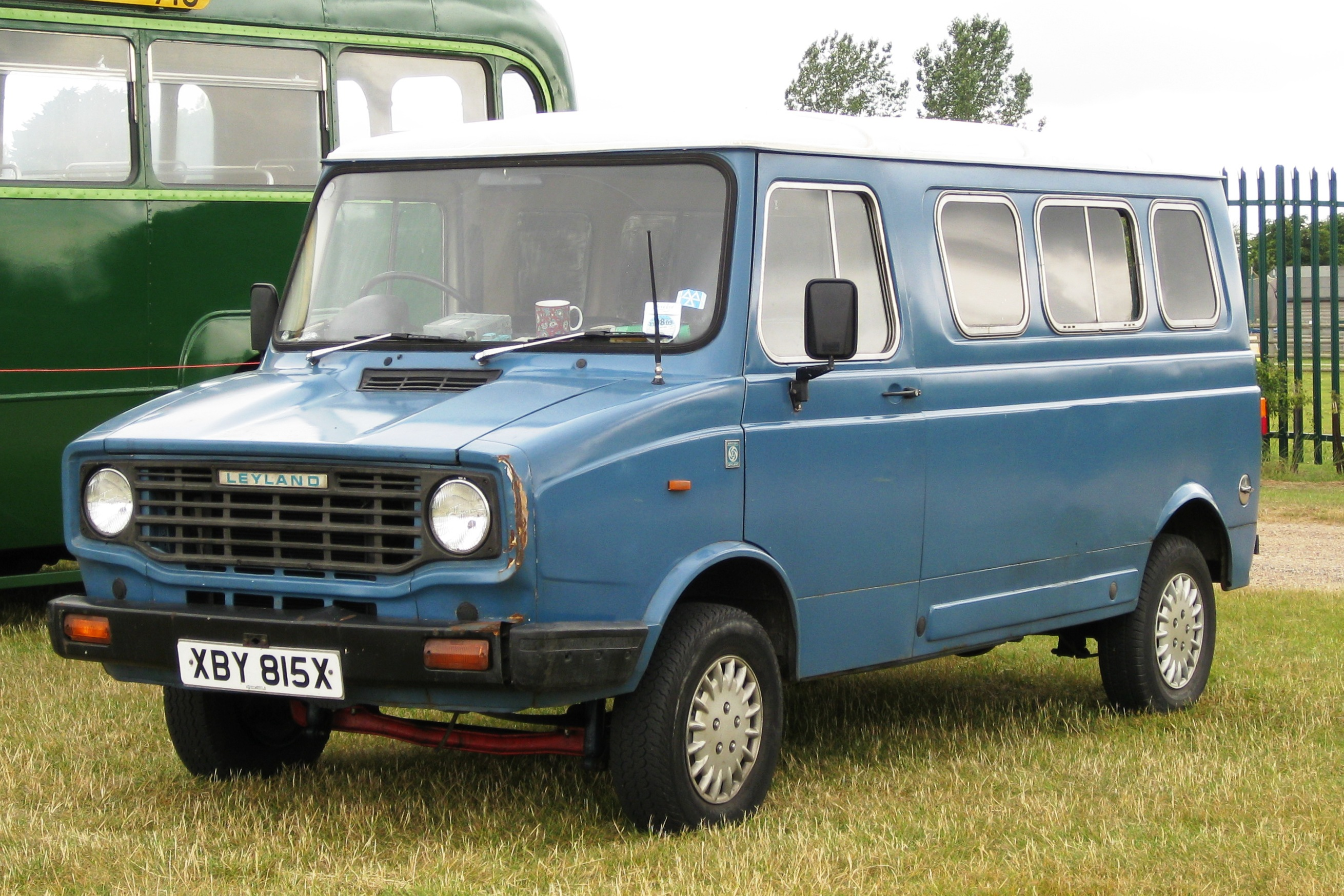
- Court: House of Lords
- Full case name: Re Leyland DAF Ltd or Buchler v Talbot
- Decided: 4 March 2004
- Citations: [2004] AC 298 [2004] UKHL 9 [2004] 2 WLR 582 [2004] BCC 214

Case history
- Prior action: [2002] EWCA Civ 228

Court membership
- Judges sitting: Lord Nicholls of Birkenhead; Lord Hoffmann; Lord Millett; Lord Rodger of Earlsferry; Lord Walker of Gestingthorpe

Case opinions
- Lord Nicholls of Birkenhead; Lord Hoffmann; Lord Millett

Keywords
- Priority, administration expenses

Buchler v Talbot [2004] UKHL 9 is a UK insolvency law case, concerning the priority of claims in a liquidation. Under English law at the time the expenses of liquidation took priority over the preferred creditors, and the preferred creditors took priority over the claims of the holder of a floating charge. However, a crystallised floating charge theoretically took priority over the liquidation expenses. Accordingly the courts had to try and reconcile the apparent triangular conflict between priorities.

== Facts ==
In 1992, Leyland DAF Ltd, an English member of the Dutch group DAF Trucks, granted to Stichting Ofasec a mortgage debenture to secure a loan, containing a floating charge. In 1993, the DAF group collapsed, and Ofasec appointed administrative receivers, which crystallised the floating charge into a fixed charge. The receivers realised the assets, paid preferential debts, and made interim distributions to Ofasec. £72m remained. In the Netherlands, litigation was ongoing meaning this sum could have been insufficient to meet the claims of the debenture holder. In 1996, Leyland DAF Ltd entered voluntary liquidation. The liquidator’s costs exceeded the amount realised, but they applied for a declaration that their expenses and pay should come out of the proceeds of the realisation of the assets of Leyland DAF Ltd including those subject to a floating charge.

Rimer J held that under Insolvency Act 1986, section 175(2)(b) the liquidators were entitled to have their expenses. The Court of Appeal agreed. Ofasec appealed.

== Judgment ==
The House of Lords held there was no priority for the liquidator’s expenses, and that Re Barleycorn Enterprises Ltd was wrongly decided. Lord Nicholls gave the first judgment, saying that section 175(2)(b) and its predecessors had never authorised liquidators’ costs and expenses.

Lord Hoffmann held that when a company was in receivership and liquidation, the company’s former assets were comprised in two separate funds, each with its own costs of administration. Neither should bear the costs of administering the other. None of the costs and expenses of winding up Leyland DAF Ltd were payable out of the assets under the floating charge until all the principal and interest had been paid.

29. ‘When a floating charge crystallises, it becomes a fixed charge attaching to all the assets of the company which fall within its terms. Thereafter the assets subject to the floating charge form a separate fund in which the debenture holder has a proprietary interest. For the purposes of paying off the secured debt, it is his fund. The company has only an equity of redemption; the right to retransfer of the assets when the debt secured by the floating charge has been paid off. It is this equity of redemption which forms part of the fund held on trust for the company's creditors which arises upon a winding up.’

Lord Millett gave the longest judgment, where he referred to Re Barleycorn Enterprises Ltd and why it had been mistaken.

67. ‘It may be observed in passing that this ruling was exclusively at the expense of the preferential creditors. On any view the bank was due to receive nothing by virtue of its security. The Court of Appeal's decision had the result that a statute passed for the benefit of the company's workers could well benefit the liquidator (by enabling him to recoup his expenses of administering one fund by taking them out of another for the administration of which he was not responsible) without benefiting the workers at all. A curiosity of the case is that there would have been no answer to the accountants' claim if they had persuaded the bank to release its security, which was worthless. But the bank would no doubt have refused to do so, since it was also the largest single preferred creditor.

Lord Rodger and Lord Walker agreed.

== Subsequent legislation ==
Very shortly after the decision was handed down it was reversed by legislation under English law. Section 176ZA of the Insolvency Act 1986 effectively reverts the position under English law to what it was believed to have been under Re Barleycorn Enterprises Ltd. However, Buchler v Talbot remains good law in a number of other common law jurisdictions.

== See also ==
- UK labour law
- UK insolvency law
