= Re Parkes Garage (Swadlincote) Ltd =

UK insolvency law case

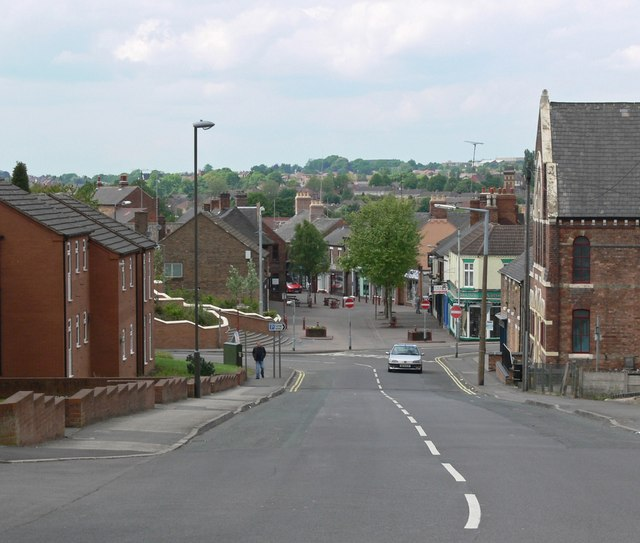
- Court: High Court
- Citation: [1929] 1 Ch 139

Case opinions
- Eve J

Keywords
- Voidable floating charge

Re Parkes Garage (Swadlincote) Ltd [1929] 1 Ch 139 is a leading UK insolvency law case, concerning a voidable floating charge for past value.

== Facts ==
The liquidator of Parkes Garage (Swadlincote) Ltd sought a declaration that a floating charge on the company's property given by a debenture to a creditor, Mr Oswald Ling, was invalid. Parkes Garage Ltd, a garage proprietor and motor dealer, went insolvent in March 1927 (though this only transpired during litigation). On 15 June it executed a floating charge for a group of creditors (the trustee acting for the group was an accountant named Mr Oswald Ling). On 27 July the company sold part of the business and used that cash to pay off the group of creditors, with interest and a fee to Mr Ling. They endorsed a memorandum of discharge on the debenture. On 14 September, another creditor, Midland Bank, heard about these dealings and successfully petitioned for a winding up order. The liquidator alleged that under section 212 of the Companies (Consolidation) Act 1908 (now Insolvency Act 1986 section 245) the debenture for Ling was invalid because it was conferred more value than it was worth in the three months before insolvency.

The County Court judge held that the payment of the debts to the group of creditors was invalid. Mr Ling appealed.

== Judgment ==
Eve J held that it was not open to the judge to declare the debenture as a whole invalid, so that no debt would be repaid at all. He was only allowed to declare the charge invalid, because that is all that Companies (Consolidation) Act 1908, section 212 (now Insolvency Act 1986, section 245) affected. The charge could not be merged with the debt itself. Nevertheless, it might well be argued yet that the whole transaction was invalid as a fraudulent preference, but that was not done here.

But having regard to what has been disclosed in these proceedings, that the company was hopelessly insolvent from the beginning of March down to the date of the winding-up order, and that the effect of the payments to these half dozen creditors on July 27 was to apply the whole available assets of the company to the payment of their debts in full and to leave other creditors whose debts largely exceeded the aggregate amount paid to the half dozen unprovided for, raises a doubt whether the whole transaction, which culminated in the payments on July 27, was not in the nature of a fraudulent preference. We desire therefore to give the liquidator an opportunity of considering the position from this standpoint, and in allowing this appeal to state that the order is without prejudice to any application to set aside the payments or to question the validity of the debenture on the ground of its being a fraudulent preference or on any other grounds which the liquidator may think fit to advance.

Maugham J concurred.

== See also ==
- UK insolvency law
