= Companies Act 1907 =

Act of the Parliament of the United Kingdom

Companies Act 1907 (Note: Section 57(1).)
- Act of Parliament
- Parliament of the United Kingdom
- Long title: An Act to amend the Companies Acts, 1862 to 1900.
- Citation: 7 Edw. 7. c. 50
- Territorial extent: United Kingdom

Dates
- Royal assent: 28 August 1907
- Commencement: 1 July 1908 (Note: Section 57(3).)
- Repealed: 1 April 1909
Other legislation
Amends	Companies Act 1862; Companies (Winding up) Act 1890; Companies Act 1900
Repealed by	Companies (Consolidation) Act 1908

Status: Repealed

Text of statute as originally enacted

The Companies Act 1907 (7 Edw. 7. c. 50) was an act of the Parliament of the United Kingdom regulating UK company law, whose descendant is the Companies Act 2006.

== Reforms ==
One reform made by the 1907 Act was to introduce explicitly a separate set of provisions for "private companies", which stood in opposition to "public companies".

== Subsequent developments ==
The whole act was repealed by section 286(1) of, and part I of the sixth schedule to, the Companies (Consolidation) Act 1908 (8 Edw. 7. c. 69), which came into force on 1 April 1909.

== See also ==
- Companies Act
- UK company law
- History of companies
