= Re Purpoint Ltd =

UK law case

- Court: High Court
- Citation: [1991] BCLC 491

Keywords
- Wrongful trading

Re Purpoint Ltd [1991] BCLC 491 is a UK insolvency law and company law case, concerning misfeasance and wrongful trading.

== Facts ==
The liquidator of Purpoint Ltd, a printing business, sued the former director Mr John Henry Meredith for wrongful trading and misfeasance under the Insolvency Act 1986 sections 212 and 214. Purpoint Ltd started trading in February 1986, with a plant and machinery, a printing press and two cars on hire purchase. Mr Meredith got a salary. Mr Meredith admitted the company was unable to pay its debts from December 1986. In May 1987, the accountants told him that he could be liable for trading while insolvent. In June Mr Meredith found a job with another firm. Purpoint Ltd ceased trading in November 1987 and went into liquidation in May 1988. The Inland Revenue's claims exhausted all the company's assets. The liquidator brought an action under section 214 and under section 212 claimed back money used to get the second car on hire purchase, which it said was not needed for the business; cash sums withdrawn in June and July 1987 and transactions between the company and the firm Mr Meredith left to work with.

== Judgment ==
Vinelott J held that Mr Meredith was liable and ordered him to pay £12,666.79 under section 212 (£4k for the car, £5k for cash withdrawals and £3k for work done for the firm) and £53,572.15 plus interest under section 214. Under section 212 (1) the car was not bought for business use, and the purchase was a breach of duty (2) cash that could not be accounted for and used by Mr Meredith and his wife had to be repaid (3) on one transaction the new firm Mr Meredith had moved to make a profit at the company's expense. He had to disgorge this gain. Under section 214, because Mr Meredith clearly knew the company was insolvent by December 1986, he was liable for all trading losses after then. Lastly, there was nothing wrong with making orders under both section 212 and section 214. He said the answer to double recovery arguments is that money recouped under s 212 can be used to pay off the debts that existed before the clock started to run under section 214. The only proviso is that Mr Meredith would not be made to pay back more under section 212 than needed to meet the company's liabilities.

== See also ==
- UK insolvency law
- UK company law
