= Trading while insolvent =

A number of legal systems make provision for companies trading while insolvent to be unlawful in certain circumstances, and provide for directors to become personally liable for a company's debts if they have acted improperly. In most legal systems, the liability in respect of unlawful transactions only extends for a certain period of time prior to the company going into liquidation.

== UK law ==
Under UK insolvency law, trading once a company is legally insolvent can trigger several provisions of the Insolvency Act 1986, including:

- Wrongful trading – Section 214
- Transaction at an undervalue – Section 238
- Preferences – Section 239
- Extortionate credit transactions – Section 244

A limited company becomes insolvent when it can no longer pay its bills when due, or its liabilities—including contingent liabilities such as redundancy payments—outweigh the company’s assets. This is a critical point in the lifespan of a company as it denotes when the directors' responsibilities move from the interests of shareholders to the interests of creditors. It also means that the directors need to be extremely careful when considering whether to continue to trade, or not. Any director who knows that the company is insolvent and makes the decision to continue to trade, and in doing so increases the debts of the company can be made liable for the company debts.

In the UK, directors are exposed in respect of transaction at an undervalue, preferences, and extortionate credit transactions if the transaction occurred: a) while the company was insolvent; and b) within 2 years before the onset of liquidation if the transaction was with a connected person, and 6 months if the transaction was with an unconnected person.

Directors who continue to trade while insolvent may face disqualification under the Company Directors Disqualification Act 1986. Under the provision of this act, when a company goes into liquidation, the liquidator must make a report to the Disqualification Unit of the Department for Business, Innovation and Skills on the conduct of all directors. If the liquidator has come across any conduct which makes the director unfit to be involved in the management of a company in the future (which things would include trading while insolvent) the Department for Business, Innovation and Skills will apply to the Court for an order disqualifying the director or directors from acting as a company director for a certain period of time.

== Other countries ==
Many other countries have similar laws, often referred to as 'insolvent trading' or wrongful trading.

== See also ==
- UK company law
- US insolvency law
