= Re Anglo-Austrian Printing & Publishing Union =

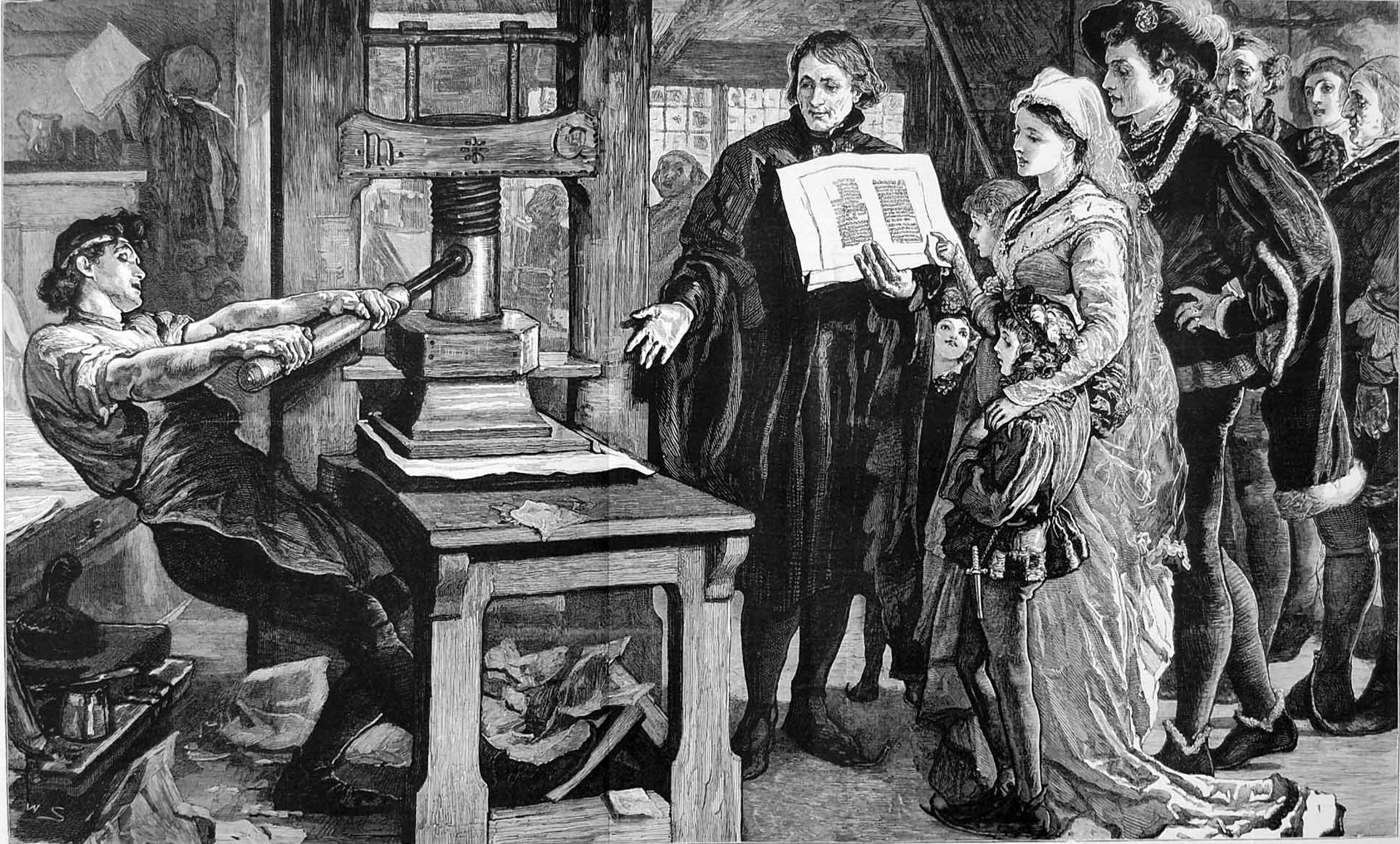
- Court: High Court
- Full case name: In Re Anglo-Austrian Printing and Publishing Union or Brabourne v Same
- Decided: 13 November 1895
- Citation: [1895] 2 Ch 891

Court membership
- Judge sitting: Vaughan Williams J

Keywords
- Misfeasance

Re Anglo-Austrian Printing & Publishing Union [1895] 2 Ch 891 is a UK insolvency law and company law case, concerning recovery of assets under a misfeasance action. It was held that because the claims were vested in the company before the company went into liquidation, the proceeds of such a claim would be caught by a floating charge where the floating charge was expressed to include any after-acquired property.

== Facts ==
An official receiver was appointed to pursue the former directors of the Anglo-Austrian Printing & Publishing Union for misfeasance, and other funds. It recovered £7000 in damages for misfeasance and £1200 in calls on unpaid shares from former shareholders. However, a group of debenture holders had not yet been paid. They claimed the money recovered was theirs, given that it first went to the company on which they held charges, and could not be used to pay unsecured creditors before the debentures were paid off.

== Judgment ==
Vaughan Williams J held, reluctantly, that money recovered during liquidation from in proceedings under section 10 of the Companies (Winding-up) Act 1890 (53 & 54 Vict. c. 63) and by calls on contributories, belong to debenture holders charging all the undertaking and property of the company, when total assets are not enough. Costs for such proceedings must be paid first out of money recovered in those proceedings.

Upon that I can only say that, speaking for myself, I am very sorry that such should be the state of the law at the present moment. I cannot help thinking that when the question was first raised a different conclusion might have been arrived at, and it might very well have been held that such sums were outside the security. However, a contrary view has been taken and is now generally held, and I accept it. My hope now is that the Legislature may think fit to interfere. It seems to me to be an unwholesome state of things that the debenture-holders should have the control of money which has to be recovered by the officer of the Court by proceedings for misfeasance. It continually happens in practice that the debenture-holders and the promoters and officers of the company are intimately associated with each other, and then a winding-up comes, and there is not sufficient money to pay the debenture-holders in full, and in all probability the debenture-holders have acquired their debentures under such circumstances that they only expect to receive a percentage of their investment; and frequently, if they receive that, they are not only satisfied, but justly so, as they are making a large profit. In this state of things a claim often arises against officers and promoters of the company in respect of what is a fraud not only on the company, but on the unsecured creditors, and the debenture-holders are so connected with the officers or promoters that they often step in when proceedings are threatened and say, “We do not think it is worth while to go to the expense of taking proceedings to recover anything from the officers or promoters; and, moreover, the estate is ours, and we do not assent to other persons enforcing the claim.” I say this is an unwholesome state of things; and I hope the time will come when funds arising from proceedings for misfeasance will not be chargeable in favour of debenture-holders, but will be free from the debentures and available for the benefit of the unsecured creditors. But that is not the present state of the law, and I am therefore bound to hold that the solicitor and his assignee are not entitled to have the costs of the petition paid out of this fund.

== Authority ==
The case is still treated as good law and authoritative as to the proposition that it states. However, in Re Yagerphone Ltd [1935] 1 Ch 392 the opposite conclusion was reached in relation to the proceeds of any action by the liquidator to set aside a transaction as an unfair preference.

== See also ==
- UK insolvency law
- UK company law
