= Prevention of Fraud (Investments) Act 1958 =

Act of the Parliament of the United Kingdom

Prevention of Fraud (Investments) Act 1958 (Note: Section 29(1).)
- Act of Parliament
- Parliament of the United Kingdom
- Long title: An Act to consolidate the Prevention of Fraud (Investments) Act, 1939, section one hundred and seventeen of the Companies Act, 1947, and so much of the Companies Act, 1948, as relates to the enactments aforesaid.
- Citation: 6 & 7 Eliz. 2. c. 45
- Territorial extent: England and Wales; Scotland; (Note: Section 29(2).)

Dates
- Royal assent: 23 July 1958
- Commencement: 23 October 1958 (Note: Section 29(3).)
- Repealed: 29 April 1988
Other legislation
Amends	See § Repealed enactments
Repeals/revokes	See § Repealed enactments
Amended by	Industrial and Provident Societies Act 1965; Statute Law (Repeals) Act 1969; Statute Law (Repeals) Act 1974
Repealed by	Financial Services Act 1986

Status: Repealed

Text of statute as originally enacted

The Prevention of Fraud (Investments) Act 1958 (6 & 7 Eliz. 2. c. 45) was an act of the Parliament of the United Kingdom that consolidated enactments relating to the prevention of fraud in investments in Great Britain.

== Provisions ==
=== Repealed enactments ===
Section 28(1) of the act repealed 3 enactments, listed in the second schedule to the act.

Citation	Short title	Extent of repeal
2 & 3 Geo. 6. c. 16	Prevention of Fraud (Investments) Act 1939	The whole act.
10 & 11 Geo. 6. c. 47	Companies Act 1947	Section one hundred and seventeen.
11 & 12 Geo. 6. c. 38	Companies Act 1948	In section four hundred and fifty-six, the words "sections two and thirteen of the Prevention of Fraud (Investments) Act, 1939" and the words "and one hundred and seventeen"; in the Sixteenth Schedule, paragraphs 2, 3 and 6.

== Subsequent developments ==
Section 28(1) of, and schedule 2 to, the act were repealed by section 1 of, and part XI of the schedule to, the Statute Law (Repeals) Act 1974, which came into force on 27 June 1974.

The whole act was repealed by section 212(3) of, and part I of schedule 17 to, the Financial Services Act 1986, which came into force on 29 April 1988.
