= Re Continental Assurance Co of London plc =

UK law case

- Court: High Court
- Citation: [2007] 2 BCLC 287; [2001] All ER (D) 229

Keywords
- Wrongful trading

Re Continental Assurance Co of London plc [2007] 2 BCLC 287 (also, Singer v. Beckett) is a UK insolvency law case on wrongful trading under section 214 of the Insolvency Act 1986.

== Facts ==
Continental Assurance plc had gone into insolvent liquidation. The liquidators submitted that the directors were guilty of wrongful trading (Insolvency Act 1986 section 214). They had continued to trade after a crisis meeting, which should have made clear there was no reasonable prospect of coming out of insolvency. The liquidators also alleged misfeasance (section 212) through years of disorganised financial and accounting records and this was what made it difficult to tell whether the company was insolvent. Furthermore, payments to two other companies, IATA and ABTA, showed misfeasance.

== Judgment ==
Park J held that the liquidators had failed to show a case of wrongful trading or misfeasance. The directors' action was appropriate given their available information and advice. They had made careful considerations at the crisis meeting.

Park J also held that if the liquidators were correct about misfeasance, it would only be the finance director that was liable, not the other directors. But the misfeasance claim was in respect of breach of directors' duties to Continental Assurance, and therefore a loss had to be shown. But the payments to IATA and ABTA had caused no loss.

== See also ==
- UK company law
