= Re Oasis Merchandising Services Ltd =

- Court: Court of Appeal
- Decided: 9 October 1996
- Citations: [1998] Ch 170 [1997] 2 WLR 764 [1997] 1 BCLC 689 [1997] 1 All ER 1009 (1996) 146 NLJ 1513 [1998] Ch 170 [1997] BCC 282

Court membership
- Judges sitting: Peter Gibson LJ; Otton LJ; Hutchison LJ

Keywords
- Wrongful trading; Champerty; Litigation funding

Re Oasis Merchandising Services Ltd [1998] Ch 170 is a UK insolvency law and company law case, concerning wrongful trading.

== Facts ==
The liquidator brought proceedings against 5 individuals, alleged to be directors or shadow directors of the insolvent company. It tried to assign the claims to a specialist litigation company London Wall Claims Ltd, so that in return for the fruits of the litigation, they would bear the cost. The directors being sued claimed that the assignment was unlawful, as it was champertous (i.e. the wrong of getting an uninterested party involved in a lawsuit for money). Robert Walker J allowed the agreement provisionally, but allowed an appeal to the Court of Appeal to answer whether the assignment was champertous or not. London Wall Claims Ltd argued that although the agreement may be champtertous, under the Insolvency Act 1986 Schedule 4, para 6, the liquidator had the power to sell any of the company's property, and that must include the fruits of a wrongful trading action under section 214. Alternatively, the agreement was an act necessary for the course of winding up, and there would be power under the Insolvency Act 1986 Schedule 4, para 13. The directors argued that the section 214 action was not company property.

== Judgment ==
The Court of Appeal held that the assignment of the claim was not proper. The claim under s 214 is only vested in the liquidator. It arises solely when a company goes into liquidation and it would be champertous and against public policy to assign the fruits of such an action. There is no problem in assigning a s 212 action though. Under Insolvency Act 1986, s 436, company property did not include a section 214 action because there is a difference between assets of a company at the moment of liquidation, and those arising and recoverable only by a liquidator under statutory powers. The agreement the liquidator entered into was an attempt to restrict his conduct of the action. Public policy demanded that it be regarded as champertous and Schedule 4 did not authorise the agreement as being necessary for the winding up of the company's affairs.

Peter Gibson LJ noted that: "As a matter of policy we think that there is much to be said for allowing a liquidator to sell the fruits of an action for the reasons given ... provided that it does not give the purchaser the right to influence the course of, or to interfere with the liquidator's conduct of, the proceedings."

== See also ==
- UK insolvency law
- UK company law
- Re Yagerphone Ltd [1935] 1 Ch 392
