= Wrongful trading =

Wrongful trading is a type of civil wrong found in UK insolvency law, under Section 214 Insolvency Act 1986. It was introduced to enable contributions to be obtained for the benefit of creditors from those responsible for mismanagement of the insolvent company. Under Australian insolvency law the equivalent concept is called "insolvent trading".

== The Insolvency Act 1986 ==
The principle of wrongful trading was introduced in the Insolvency Act 1986, to complement the concept of fraudulent trading. Unlike fraudulent trading, wrongful trading needs no finding of 'intent to defraud' (which requires a heavy burden of proof). Wrongful trading is therefore a less serious, and more common offence than fraudulent trading.

Under UK insolvency law, wrongful trading occurs when the directors of a company have continued to trade a company past the point when they:

- "knew, or ought to have concluded that there was no reasonable prospect of avoiding insolvent liquidation"; and
- they did not take "every step with a view to minimising the potential loss to the company’s creditors".

Wrongful trading is an action that can be brought only by a company's liquidator, once it has gone into insolvent liquidation. (This may be either a voluntary liquidation - known as Creditors Voluntary Liquidation, or compulsory liquidation). It is not available to the directors of a company while it continues in existence, or to other insolvency office-holders such as an administrator.

A limited company becomes insolvent when it can no longer pay its bills when due, or when its liabilities, including contingent liabilities such as redundancy payments, outweigh the company's assets. This is a critical point in the lifespan of a company as it denotes when the directors responsibilities change from protecting the interests of the shareholders to protecting those of the creditors. It also means that the directors need to be extremely careful when considering whether to continue to trade, or not. Any director who knows that the company is insolvent and makes the decision to continue to trade, and in doing so increases the debts of the company can be made liable for the company debts.

== Liability ==
Section 214 Insolvency Act 1986 has very wide scope, since it applies not only to de jure directors (that is directors who were formally appointed and their appointment was registered with Companies House. It can apply to de facto directors (that is people who assumed the role of director of a company without being appointed), or shadow directors (that is people in accordance with whose direction the de jure directors were accustomed to act.

Initially, there was uncertainty among banks and insolvency and restructuring professionals who assisted and advised companies facing insolvency that they may be caught by the wrongful trading provisions. This has not proved to be the case (as of July 2006), and professionals are unlikely to be covered by these provisions except in exceptional circumstances.

== Obligations of directors ==
In order to establish liability, the liquidator needs to demonstrate, using the civil burden of proof (i.e. on the balance of probabilities) that the directors continued trading the company beyond a point in time when they knew, or ought to have ascertained, that insolvent liquidation was inevitable.

The facts a director ought to have known were those a reasonably diligent person—having both the skill and experience possessed by a reasonable director — together with the skill and experience actually possessed by that individual. This means that there is a two-fold test for knowledge. There is a general level of skill required for all directors under the first part of the test. Under the second, a higher standard of knowledge is required by those with specialist skills. (These are likely to be accounting or legal skills). This principle has been confirmed in a 1999 case where an executive husband had to pay £210,000 to the liquidator compared with his non-executive wife's £50,000.

The normal approach to wrongful trading actions is that the liquidator will try to establish a date at which the company can be shown to be balance sheet insolvent, and then show why it was unreasonable for directors to continue to trade after this. In the UK, and contrary to many misconceptions, it is not an offence to trade a company while it is insolvent. Indeed, in some situations, if the directors genuinely believe that the position will be turned around and the position of creditors will improve, it is the correct thing to do. When it becomes wrongful trading is when it should have been realised that the position of the creditors was likely to deteriorate from that position onwards and that the company would proceed into liquidation. Once a director realises that his or her company is insolvent, one important thing for him to do is to seek immediate professional advice from a licensed insolvency practitioner. All directors who continue as directors of a company trading while insolvent may face disqualification under the Company Directors Disqualification Act 1986. Under the provision of this act, when a company goes into liquidation, the liquidator must make a report to the Disqualification Unit of the Department for Business, Innovation and Skills on the conduct of all directors.

Many legal systems (including English law) recognise the blue sky defence; which broadly provides that, if the directors, in good faith, believed the company was about to turn the corner and improve, they would not normally be held liable for continuing to trade. Liability only attaches when the company has no realistic prospect of avoiding insolvent liquidation.

== The amount of the award ==
The Court has wide discretion over the contribution that it can require. Traditionally this has been compensatory, rather than punitive. The starting point for assessing the appropriate amount was the difference between the net assets of the company at the date that the directors should not have traded beyond, and the net assets at the date of liquidation.

The Court however has wide discretion, and may award just a percentage of this. It awarded 70% of the drop in net assets in Re Brian D Pierson (Contractors) Ltd. This was on the basis of the judge's "guesstimate" that 70% of the drop in net assets was due to the actions of the directors, and 30% could be attributed to extraneous causes, such as bad weather.

== Barriers to wrongful trading actions ==
It was thought prior to 1997 that the amount paid by a director following a wrongful trading claim was simply paid to the liquidator and it became available to swell the assets of the company generally. In most instances there would have been substantial bank borrowings secured by a debenture and personal guarantees given by the directors. Many directors chose not to fight the claims, reasoning that any amounts paid to company (hence the bank under its mortgage security) via a wrongful trading claim, simply reduced the director's liability under their personal guarantees. It was therefore irrelevant how the directors repaid the bank. This changed with the Court of Appeal's decision in 1998 that a claim for wrongful (or fraudulent) trading, is different from a normal 'asset' of the company. In particular, it held that such claim cannot be secured by a debenture. The Court held that the fruits of a claim for wrongful trading are instead held in trust by the liquidation for the general body of unsecured creditors. It then followed that the costs of a wrongful trading action could not be drawn from the company's assets held by the liquidator, and fell to be paid personally either by the liquidator (which he would not do), or would require a unanimous decision of unsecured creditors. The position has now been clarified with the Enterprise Act 2002 changing the law to allow the costs of wrongful trading actions to be included as a cost of the liquidation. These can be met from the company's assets.

As is often the case, a company in liquidation has no assets with which to bring an action for wrongful trading. How can the liquidator bring, or fund an action? Can the liquidator sell or assign the claim to a specialist litigation company?

Because a claim for wrongful trading is a personal action brought by the liquidator, it follows that if it is unsuccessful, the liquidator is personally liable for the legal costs of the defendants. This was found to be the case following a 5 months trial in which the liquidator of Continental Assurance Company of London plc sued a number of its directors. Although the costs of an action (whether successful or otherwise) can now be properly paid by the liquidator out of company assets where there are adequate funds available, the House of Lords in 2004 altered the hitherto accepted priority of costs in a liquidation, making the liquidator's costs (including the legal costs of a wrongful trading action) rank last in priority behind both preferential creditors and the sums due to debenture holders. The decisions in Continental Assurance and Leyland Daf make wrongful trading actions unattractive to liquidators.

It is now usual practice for liquidators to enter into conditional fee arrangements with lawyers and have insurance against adverse costs in place in the event that he is unsuccessful (although the Ministry of Justice has announced that an exemption allowing these arrangements will end in April 2016). The liquidator is able to assign the action regardless of the normal rules relating to champerty and maintenance. (He is empowered by statute to sell any of the company's property). As an alternative, there are commercial litigation funding organisations that take over management and funding of the entire claim, and pay the liquidators a percentage of recoveries.

== See also ==
- Trading while insolvent
- Fraudulent trading
- Insolvency
- Liquidation

=== Case list ===
- Re Produce Marketing Consortium Ltd (No 2) [1989] 5 BCC 569
- Re Purpoint Ltd [1991] BCLC 491
- Re Oasis Merchandising Services Ltd [1998] Ch 170
- Re Brian D Pierson (Contractors) Ltd [2001] 1 BCLC 275
- Re Continental Assurance Co of London plc (Singer v Beckett) [2001] BPIR 733, Ch D, [2007] 2 BCLC 287
- Re Cubelock Ltd [2001] BCC 523
