= Companies Act 1947 =

Act of the Parliament of the United Kingdom

Companies Act 1947 (Note: Section 123(1).)
- Act of Parliament
- Parliament of the United Kingdom
- Long title: An Act to amend the law relating to companies and unit trusts and to dealing in securities, and in connection therewith to amend the law of bankruptcy and the law relating to the registration of business names.
- Citation: 10 & 11 Geo. 6. c. 47
- Territorial extent: United Kingdom

Dates
- Royal assent: 6 August 1947
- Commencement: 1 July 1948 (Note: Section 135(2).)
Other legislation
Amends	Bankruptcy (Scotland) Act 1913; Bankruptcy Act 1914; Registration of Business Names Act 1916; Companies Act 1929
Amended by	Companies Act 1948; Statute Law Revision Act 1950; Prevention of Fraud (Investments) Act 1958; Companies Act 1981; Insolvency Act 1985; Bankruptcy (Scotland) Act 1985; Insolvency Act 1986

Status: Partially repealed

Text of statute as originally enacted

Revised text of statute as amended

Text of the Companies Act 1947 as in force today (including any amendments) within the United Kingdom, from legislation.gov.uk.

The Companies Act 1947 (10 & 11 Geo. 6. c. 47) is an act of the Parliament of the United Kingdom, that updated UK company law after the Companies Act 1929 (19 & 20 Geo. 5. c. 23).

It covered issues such as winding-up and bankruptcy.

It was soon recodified in the Companies Act 1948 (11 & 12 Geo. 6. c. 38).

== See also ==
- UK company law
