= Companies Act 1929 =

Act of the Parliament of the United Kingdom

Companies Act 1929 (Note: Section 385(1).)
- Act of Parliament
- Parliament of the United Kingdom
- Long title: An Act to consolidate the Companies Acts, 1908 to 1928, and certain other enactments connected with the said Acts.
- Citation: 19 & 20 Geo. 5. c. 23
- Territorial extent: England and Wales; Scotland; (Note: Section 384.)

Dates
- Royal assent: 10 May 1929
- Commencement: 1 November 1929 (Note: Section 385(2).)
- Repealed: 1 July 1948
Other legislation
Repeals/revokes	Companies (Consolidation) Act 1908; Companies Act 1913; Companies (Particulars as to Directors) Act 1917; Companies Act 1928
Amended by	False Oaths (Scotland) Act 1933; Companies Act 1947
Repealed by	Companies Act 1948

Status: Repealed

Text of statute as originally enacted

The Companies Act 1929 (19 & 20 Geo. 5. c. 23) was an act of the Parliament of the United Kingdom, which regulated UK company law. Its descendant is the Companies Act 2006.

== Report of the Company Law Amendment Committee ==
The Report of the Company Law Amendment Committee (1926) Cmnd 2657, known as the Report of the Greene Committee was a UK company law report led by Wilfred Greene M.R. that led to the Companies Act 1929.

=== Overview and excerpts ===
- ‘Public attention was directed by the decision in the City Equitable Case to the common article which exempts directors from liability for loss except when it is due to their wilful neglect or default... Another form of article

which has become common in recent years goes even farther and exempts directors in every case except that of actual dishonesty.’

- ‘We consider that shareholders representing a substantial portion of the voting power should have the right to requisition a certified statement of the remuneration, etc., paid to directors, including managing directors.’

The Report recommended increasing disclosure through common standards on accounts.

Under the present law there is no direct statutory obligation on a company to keep proper accounts. We consider that the law should be altered so as to make the keeping of such accounts compulsory. In the case of companies it is for obvious reasons impossible to specify with any elaboration the accounts to be kept, and our recommendation goes as far in this direction as we consider to be practicable. Experience shows that in many instances, particularly in the case of private companies, accounts are not properly kept, with the result that when liquidation ensues the company's books are found to be so defective and confused that it is impossible to find out what has become of goods and money belonging to it. There can be no doubt that default of this kind is often deliberate, and we consider that heavy penalties should be imposed with imprisonment when the default is wilful.

== Provisions ==
Forms made under the 1929 act introduced the term "Companies Court", referring to the High Court, Chancery Division, when exercising its jurisdiction for company law matters (Re Tasbian Ltd (No 2) [1990] BCC 322, 324).

Section 77(1) authorised the court in a compulsory winding up to direct the liquidator either to prosecute the offender himself or to refer the matter to the Director of Public Prosecutions. If it appeared to the liquidator in a voluntary winding up that any past or present director, manager or other officer of the company had been guilty of an offence in relation to the company for which he was criminally liable, section 77(2) required him to report the matter to the Director of Public Prosecutions. It also required the liquidator to give the Director of Public Prosecutions information and access to documents in his possession or under his control. If the Director of Public Prosecutions decided not to bring proceedings against the offender, the liquidator could do so himself though only with the leave of the court. This was a safeguard against the company's assets being wasted on frivolous or vexatious proceedings.

== Repeal ==
The whole act was repealed by section 459(1) of, and part I of the seventeenth schedule to, the Companies Act 1948 (11 & 12 Geo. 6. c. 38), which came into force on 1 July 1948.

== See also ==
- UK company law
- Companies Act
