= Preferential creditor =

Creditor with a priority right to payment upon bankruptcy

Preferential Payments in Bankruptcy Act 1888 (Note: Section 7.)
- Act of Parliament
- Parliament of the United Kingdom
- Long title: 24 December 1888 An Act to amend the Law with respect to Preferential Payments in Bankruptcy, and in the winding-up of Companies.
- Citation: 51 & 52 Vict. c. 62
- Territorial extent: England and Wales; Scotland; (Note: Section 4.)

Dates
- Royal assent: 24 December 1888
- Commencement: 1 January 1889 (Note: Section 5.)
- Repealed: 1 January 1915
Other legislation
Amends	Companies Act 1883; Bankruptcy Act 1883
Repeals/revokes	Bankruptcy (Agricultural Labourers' Wages) Act 1886
Amended by	Companies (Consolidation) Act 1908
Repealed by	Bankruptcy Act 1914

Status: Repealed

Text of statute as originally enacted

A preferential creditor (in some jurisdictions called a preferred creditor) is a creditor receiving a preferential right to payment upon the debtor's bankruptcy under applicable insolvency laws.

In most legal systems, some creditors are given priority over ordinary creditors, either for the whole amount of their claims or up to a certain value. In some legal systems, preferential creditors take priority over all other creditors, including creditors holding security, but more commonly, the preferential creditors are only given priority over unsecured creditors. Some legal systems operate a hybrid approach; in the United Kingdom preferential creditors have priority over secured creditors whose security is in the nature of a floating charge, but creditors with fixed security take ahead of the preferential creditors generally.

In English law the concept was first introduced for personal bankruptcy in 1825 pursuant to the Bankruptcy Act 1825 (6 Geo. 4. c. 16), and for companies in 1888 pursuant to the Preferential Payments in Bankruptcy Act 1888 (51 & 52 Vict. c. 62). Prior to that, all unsecured creditors ranked equally and without preference ("pari passu") in a series of statutes stretching back to the Statute of Bankrupts 1542.

== Classes of preferred creditors ==
Creditors who are characteristically preferred creditors are:

- employees: If a company goes bankrupt, the employees of that company will be first in line to be paid. If the company owes wages, this is considered to be the top priority when it comes to dissolving the company.
- revenue authorities: When a government is owed taxes, they are on the top of the list to get paid.
- in some countries, tort victims: The rationale for tort victims is that they are perceived to be "involuntary" creditors of the bankrupt and thus should not be penalised by an insolvency in the same manner as parties who voluntarily became creditors of the bankrupt.
- in some countries, environmental clean-up costs: If a business files for bankruptcy and it is determined that they need to clean up the environment as a result of their business actions, the environmental clean up will get preferential treatment. The courts will allocate a designated amount of money to pay for the clean-up efforts.

In the United Kingdom, employees' holiday pay/wages are classed as preferential – if they are paid via redundancy payments fund then the Department of Employment becomes a secured creditor. If there is a shortfall, in those cases where someone earns in excess of the government limit, then they can claim preferentially too. The right of the Crown as a preferential creditor was removed by the Enterprise Act 2002 but reintroduced with effect from 1 December 2020 by the Finance Act 2020.

Creditors, and sometimes individual assets, are also placed in classes by specific laws for specific events, such as a deposit insurance scheme triggered by a bank failure. For example, Switzerland's deposit protection has Class I (first-class), Class II (second-class) and Class III (third-class) unsecured creditors. following are the preferential creditors:- 1.all revenues, taxes, cesses and rates, whether payable to the Government or local authority, due to payment by the company with in 12 months before the date of commencement of winding up.

== Admiralty claims ==
In admiralty law, many legal systems accord certain claims preferential status where a ship is subject to arrest. These claims vary from country to country, but commonly include:

- salvage claims
- seaman's wages
- moorage fees: Cost of mooring is often a preferential claim of expediency. Otherwise it would be difficult to arrange mooring for vessels which are subject to arrest.

== See also ==
- Preferred stock
