= Companies Act 1948 =

Act of the Parliament of the United Kingdom

Companies Act 1948 (Note: Section 462(1).)
- Act of Parliament
- Parliament of the United Kingdom
- Long title: An Act to consolidate the Companies Act, 1929, the Companies Act, 1947 (other than the provisions thereof relating to the registration of business names, bankruptcy and the prevention of fraud in connection with unit trusts), and certain other enactments amending the first-mentioned Act.
- Citation: 11 & 12 Geo. 6. c. 38
- Territorial extent: England and Wales; Scotland; (Note: Section 461(1).)

Dates
- Royal assent: 30 June 1948
- Commencement: 1 July 1948 (Note: Section 462(2).)
- Repealed: 1 July 1985
Other legislation
Amends	Foreign Jurisdiction Act 1890; See § Repealed enactments
Repeals/revokes	See § Repealed enactments
Amended by	Criminal Justice (Scotland) Act 1949; Justices of the Peace Act 1949; Statute Law Revision Act 1953; Prevention of Fraud (Investments) Act 1958; Insurance Companies Act 1958; Charities Act 1960; Statute Law Revision Act 1963; Law Reform (Miscellaneous Provisions) (Scotland) Act 1966; Theft Act 1968; Statute Law (Repeals) Act 1969; Courts Act 1971; Consumer Credit Act 1974; Statute Law (Repeals) Act 1975; Senior Courts Act 1981; Companies Act 1985
Repealed by	Companies Consolidation (Consequential Provisions) Act 1985
Relates to	Bankruptcy Act 1914

Status: Repealed

Text of statute as originally enacted

The Companies Act 1948 (11 & 12 Geo. 6. c. 38) was an act of the Parliament of the United Kingdom that consolidated enactments related to company law in Great Britain. The act regulated UK company law. Its descendant is the Companies Act 2006.

== Provisions ==
=== Repealed enactments ===
Section 459(1) of the act repealed 11 enactments, listed in part I of the seventeenth schedule to the act, and three provisions of the Companies Act 1947 (10 & 11 Geo. 6. c. 47), listed in part II of that schedule.

Part I - general repeals
Citation	Short title	Extent of repeal
19 & 20 Geo. 5. c. 23	Companies Act 1929	The whole act.
24 & 25 Geo. 5. c. 23	Workmen's Compensation (Coal Mines) Act 1934	In section three, in subsection (6), the words from "and (8)" to the end of paragraph (c), and the words "or the company, as the case may be".
25 & 26 Geo. 5. c. 8	Unemployment Insurance Act 1935	In section twenty, subsection (1).
26 Geo. 5 & 1 Edw. 8. c. 32	National Health Insurance Act 1936	In section one hundred and seventy-seven, subsection (1).
1 Edw. 8 & 1 Geo. 6. c. 54	Finance Act 1937	In Part III of the Fifth Schedule, in paragraph 5, the words from "in the winding-up" to "that charge" and the words "and companies".
2 & 3 Geo. 6. c. 57	War Risks Insurance Act 1939	Section five.
5 & 6 Geo. 6. c. 21	Finance Act 1942	In section twenty, subsections (2) and (3), and in subsection (4) the words "and the last foregoing subsection shall not apply to a company registered in Scotland".
7 & 8 Geo. 6. c. 15	Reinstatement in Civil Employment Act 1944	In section eighteen, subsections (2) and (3), and subsection (4) so far as it relates to those subsections.
9 & 10 Geo. 6. c. 62	National Insurance (Industrial Injuries) Act 1946	In section seventy-one, subsection (1), and in the Ninth Schedule the entry relating to the Companies Act 1929.
9 & 10 Geo. 6. c. 67	National Insurance Act 1946	In section fifty-five, subsection (1).
10 & 11 Geo. 6. c. 47	Companies Act 1947	Sections one to fifty-seven and fifty-nine to ninety. In section ninety-one, subsection (3), in subsection (4) the words "and two hundred and ninety-eight", in subsection (5) the words from "and in relation to" to the end of the subsection, and subsections (7) and (8). In section ninety-two, subsection (1). Sections ninety-three to ninety-eight and one hundred to one hundred and fourteen. In section one hundred and fifteen, in subsection (1), the words "other than a company within the stannaries" and the words from "and also" to the end of the subsection. Sections one hundred and eighteen to one hundred and twenty-one. In section one hundred and twenty-two, in subsection (1), the words from "and, except" to the end of the subsection, and subsections (2) to (7). In section one hundred and twenty-three, in subsection (1), the words from "and this Act" to the end of the subsection, and subsection (3) so far as it relates to Part I of the Ninth Schedule. The First to Eighth Schedules, and Part I of the Ninth Schedule.

Part II - provisions of the Companies Act, 1947, repealed except for purposes of section one hundred and fifteen thereof.
Provision	Extent of repeal
Section ninety-one	The whole section except so far as it has effect for the purposes of subsection (1) of section one hundred and fifteen of the Companies Act 1947.
Section ninety-two	The whole section except as applied by subsection (4) of the said section one hundred and fifteen.
Section ninety-nine	The whole section except as applied by subsection (5) of the said section one hundred and fifteen.

== Subsequent developments ==
The Law Commission proposed consolidating the act in their second programme on consolidation and statute law revision, published on 20 April 1971.

The whole act was repealed by sections 28, 29 and 31(9) of, and schedule 1 to, the Companies Consolidation (Consequential Provisions) Act 1985 (c. 9), which came into force on 1 July 1985.

== Cases decided under the act ==
- Bushell v Faith [1970] AC 1099
- Scottish Co-operative Wholesale Society Ltd v Meyer
- Stonegate Securities Ltd v Gregory [1980] Ch 576

== See also ==
- Companies Act
