= Citco Banking Corporation NV v Pusser's Ltd =

- Court: Judicial Committee of the Privy Council
- Full case name: Citco Banking Corporation NV v (1) Pusser's Ltd, and (2) Charles Tobias
- Decided: 28 February 2007
- Citations: [2007] Bus LR 960 [2007] UKPC 13 [2007] 2 BCLC 483 [2007] BCC 205
- Transcript: BAILII

Court membership
- Judges sitting: Lord Hoffmann; Lord Scott of Foscote; Lord Rodger of Earlsferry; Lord Walker of Gestingthorpe; Lord Mance

Case opinions
- Decision by: Lord Hoffman

Citco Banking Corporation NV v Pusser's Ltd [2007] UKPC 13 is a judicial decision of the Privy Council on appeal from the British Virgin Islands in relation to the validity of amendments to the memorandum and articles of association of a company, and the requirement of shareholders to exercise the votes attached to their shares in the best interests of the company as a whole.

== Facts ==
The key facts are set out in the first paragraph of the decision of the Judicial Committee of the Privy Council. Pusser's Ltd had an authorized share capital of $4.4m divided into 4.4m class A shares of $1 each, of which 1,673,217 shares and warrants for another 248,000 had been issued. Each class A share or warrant carried one vote. On the 16th of March, 1994 at an extraordinary general meeting the shareholders of the company voted by special resolution to amend its articles of association to create 200,000 new class B shares, these shares would carry 50 votes each. It further resolved that 200,000 of the class A shares held by the chairman of the company, Charles Tobias, should be converted into class B shares. The resolutions were passed by 1,125,665 votes to 183,000. All of the dissenting shares were held by Citco Banking Corporation NV.

Citco alleged that the resolutions were invalid because they were passed in the interests of Tobias, to give him indisputable control, and not bona fide in the interests of the company, as required under the common law rule in Allen v Gold Reefs of West Africa Ltd [1900] 1 Ch 656 this exercise of the votes attached to the shares was improper.

== Decision ==
=== First instance ===
The case came before Benjamin J at first instance in June 1998. He eventually handed down his judgment on 7 April 2003, nearly 5 years later. The Privy Council described that delay as "completely unacceptable", and noted that this was "a violation of the constitutional right of the parties to a determination of their dispute within a reasonable time" as well as being "detrimental to the interests of the British Virgin Islands as a financial centre which can offer investors efficient and impartial justice."

In his judgment, Benjamin J held that "I find it impossible to say that what was effected by the resolution is for the benefit of Citco and the remaining shareholders", and struck down the proposed amendment.

=== Court of Appeal ===
Pussers then appealed. The Eastern Caribbean Court of Appeal handed down its decision on 20 September 2004, Gordon JA giving the judgment of the court. The Court of Appeal reversed the judge at first instance, holding that he had applied the wrong test. However they cautioned that although the amendment itself was lawful, that the behaviour of the main shareholders of Pussers might expose the company to a derivative action.

Citco then appealed to the Privy Council.

=== Privy Council ===
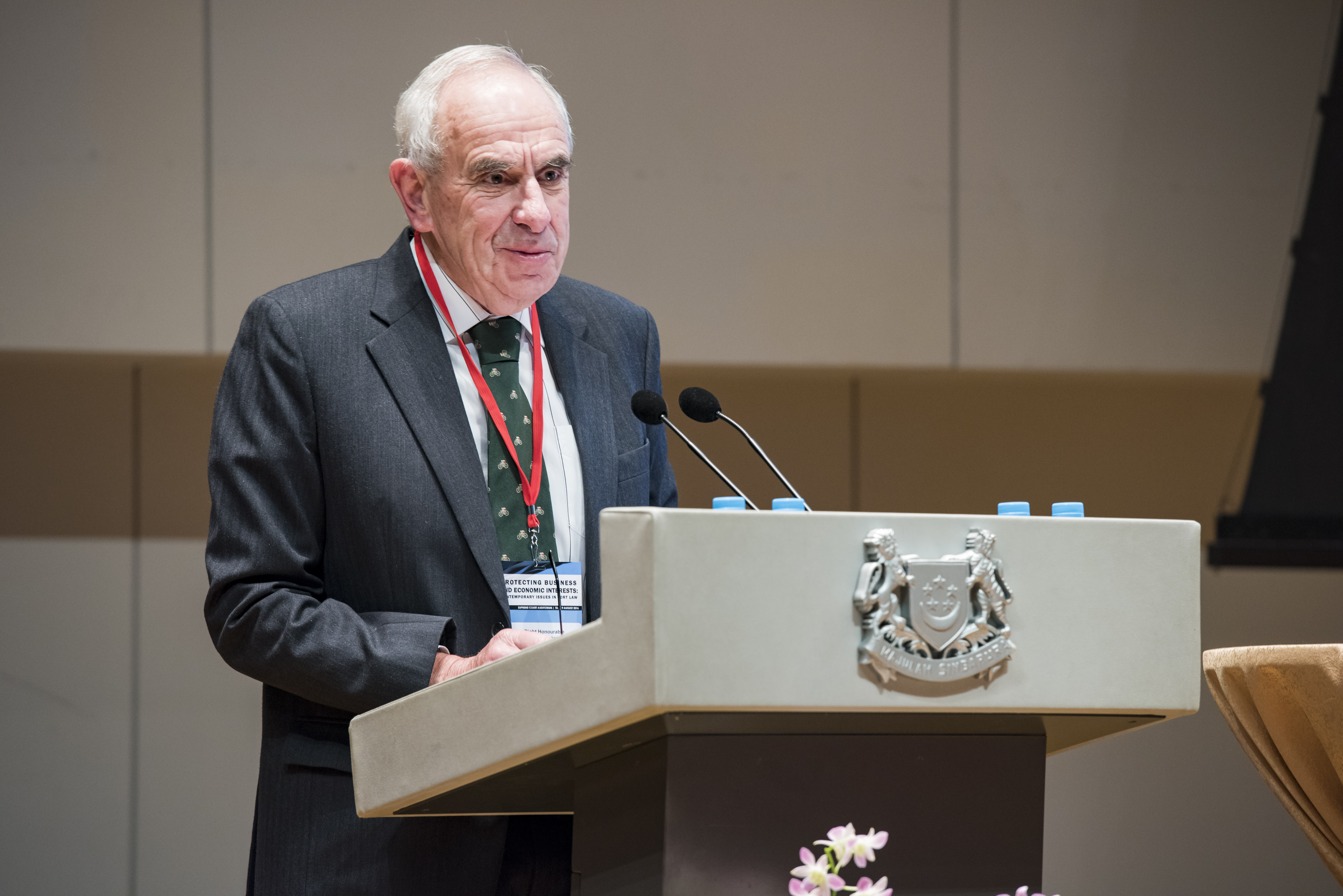
The advice of the Privy Council was given by Lord Hoffman.

The advice of the Privy Council was given by Lord Hoffman.

His Lordship noted that the courts have always treated the power to amend a company's constitutional documents as subject to certain limitations. In Andrews v Gas Meter Company [1897] 1 Ch 361 it was accepted in principle that companies could create classes of shares with preferential rights. He then reviewed the decision of the Court of Appeal of England and Wales in Allen v Gold Reefs of West Africa Ltd [1900] 1 Ch 656. In that case the company amended the articles to extend its lien to fully paid shares. Only one shareholder held fully paid shares and so the amendment operated to the disadvantage of that shareholder. Despite this the Court of Appeal held the amendment valid. Lord Hoffman cited with approval the statement of Lindley MR:

The power ... conferred on companies ... to alter the regulations contained in their articles is limited only by the provisions contained in the statute and the conditions contained in the company memorandum of association. Wide, however, as the language ... is, the power conferred by it must, like all other powers, be exercised subject to those general principles of law and equity which are applicable to all powers conferred on majorities and enabling them to bind minorities. It must be exercised, not only in the manner required by law, but also bona fide for the benefit of the company as a whole, and it must not be exceeded. These conditions are always implied, and are seldom, if ever, expressed. But if they are complied with I can discover no ground for judicially putting any other restrictions on the power conferred by the section than those contained in it.

Lord Hoffman then considered a number of further cases which considered what "bona fide for the benefit of the company as a whole" meant, including Shuttleworth v Cox Brothers and Co (Maidenhead) Ltd [1927] 2 KB 9, where he approved the statement of Scrutton LJ:

Now when persons, honestly endeavouring to decide what will be for the benefit of the company and to act accordingly, decide upon a particular course, then, provided there are grounds on which reasonable men could come to the same decision, it does not matter whether the Court would or would not come to the same decision or a different decision. It is not the business of the Court to manage the affairs of the company. That is for the shareholders and directors. The absence of any reasonable ground for deciding that a certain course of action is conducive to the benefit of the company may be a ground for finding lack of good faith or for finding that the shareholders, with the best motives, have not considered the matters which they ought to have considered. On either of these findings their decision might be set aside. But I should be sorry to see the Court go beyond this and take upon itself the management of concerns which others may understand far better than the Court does.

He also reviewed the decision in Rights & Issues Investment Trust Ltd v Stylo Shoes Ltd [1965] Ch 250 where the articles were amended to double the number of votes attached to special management shares in order to maintain the control of the existing management. In that case Pennycuick J accepted that the amendment was valid. He further considered Greenhalgh v Arderne Cinemas Ltd [1951] Ch 286, where the relevant amendment was to remove a pre-emption clause to facilitate a sale of control to a third party, and Sir Raymond Evershed MR stated that "the company as a whole" did not mean the company as a corporate entity but "the corporators as a general body" and that it was necessary to ask whether the amendment was, in the honest opinion of those who voted in favour, for the benefit of a hypothetical member. He noted that some commentators have not found the approach in that case helpful, but stated that "for the purposes of this appeal it is not necessary to discuss such cases any further".

Lord Hoffman then noted that the burden of proof lies upon the person who seeks to challenge the validity of an amendment (applying Peters' American Delicacy Company Ltd v Heath (1939) 61 CLR 457).

After that review, Lord Hoffman considered the decisions below, and indicated that the reasoning of the Court of Appeal was correct. They rejected the argument of Citco's counsel that the votes of Tobias should be discounted, noting that Evershed MR had said in Greenhalgh v Arderne Cinemas Ltd [1951] Ch 286 (at 291): "It is ... not necessary to require that persons voting for a special resolution should, so to speak, dissociate themselves altogether from their own prospects..." They noted that there was no attack on the bona fides of the vote, only its outcome.

Accordingly, they advised that the appeal should be dismissed and the amendment upheld.

== See also ==
- British Virgin Islands company law
