= Myers v Elman =

1940 English court case

Myers v Elman (1940) AC 282 is a landmark law case and precedent in English Law on making personal cost orders against solicitors where a lawyer has knowingly lodged a misleading affidavit.

The judgment, holding that the solicitor on record is responsible for the work of the staff under them, and for solicitors to rectify any documents given to a court that the lawyer knows to be wrong or inaccurate.

Elman was a solicitor who tendered an affidavit to the court that was drafted by his law clerk, Osbourn. During the trial it became obvious that the affidavit was falsely sworn. The plaintiff sought damages against the lawyer, and the judge Robin Maugham, 2nd Viscount Maugham made the order for damages, holding that Osborne had knowingly prepared a false affidavit.

Lord Maugham said that a solicitor:

"can not simply allow the client to make whatever affidavit of documents he thinks fit, nor can he escape the responsibility of careful investigation or supervision ... a solicitor who has innocently put upon the file an affidavit by his client, which he subsequently discovers to be false, owes a duty to the Court to put the matter right at the earliest moment if he continues to act as solicitor on the record."

== See also ==
- Linwood v Andrews (1888) 58 LT 612
