= Maugham =

Maugham is a surname most commonly associated with the English literary family. The name is a variant of Malham, Malgham, and Malghum. Families with the name originate from the area surrounding Malham and Kirkby Malham.

Well-known persons with this surname include:

- Robert Ormond Maugham, English barrister and father of Somerset Maugham
  - Frederic Maugham, 1st Viscount Maugham, English statesman, the eldest son of the previous
    - Robin Maugham, English writer, the only son of the previous
    - Honor Earl, English painter, daughter of Frederic Maugham
  - W. Somerset Maugham, English writer
    - Syrie Maugham, interior decorator and wife of W. Somerset Maugham
- Daphne Mabel Maugham, painter
