= Estmanco (Kilner House) Ltd v Greater London Council =

Estmanco Ltd v Greater London Council
- Court: High Court of Justice
- Full case name: Estmanco (Kilner House) Ltd v Greater London Council
- Citation: [1982] 1 WLR 2, [1982] 1 All ER 437

Keywords
- Derivative claim

Estmanco (Kilner House) Ltd v Greater London Council [1982] 1 WLR 2 is a UK company law and UK insolvency law case concerning derivative claims. It held that majority voting power cannot be used to stultify the purposes for which the company was formed, although the result has to be read in light of the new directors' duties and derivative claim codified in the Companies Act 2006 sections 172 and 260-26.

== Facts ==
Ms Frances Mary Cope had bought a flat in a refurbished housing block, Kilner House Clayton St, London SE11 5SE, that had been owned by the Greater London Council until the Conservative Party began its right to buy policy of privatising council housing. Estmanco (Kilner House) Ltd was set up to hold properties, and allot to each buyer a share, but with the GLC retaining all voting rights until the last flat was sold. Then the Labour Party won the election, and halted the privatisation policy. Ms Cope requested permission to bring a derivative claim for herself and other people who had bought their flats, alleging that the directors (now effectively the Labour administration of the GLC) breached their duty to act for proper purposes.

== Judgment ==
Sir Robert Megarry VC held that the derivative claim could continue, and the Greater London Council could not use its voting power to permanently prevent other shareholders acquiring voting rights, as that would undermine the purpose for which the company was formed. This would be a fraud on the minority, according to Foss v Harbottle and Daniels v Daniels.

== See also ==
- UK company law
