= Wallersteiner v Moir (No 2) =

- Court: Court of Appeal of England and Wales
- Decided: 15 November 1974
- Citation: [1975] QB 373; [1975] 2 WLR 389; [1975] 1 All ER 849

Court membership
- Judges sitting: Lord Denning MR, Buckley LJ and Scarman LJ

Wallersteiner v Moir (No 2) [1975] QB 373 is a UK company law case, concerning the rules to bring a derivative claim. The updated law, which replaced the exceptions and the rule in Foss v Harbottle, is now contained in the Companies Act 2006 sections 260–264, but the case remains an example of the likely result in the old and new law alike.

This case followed on from a previous decision, Wallersteiner v Moir, that concerned piercing the corporate veil.

== Facts ==
Mr Moir, a minority shareholder, in the course of an ongoing battle over a company owned Dr Wallersteiner, applied for money to continue a claim against Dr Wallersteiner for fraud. Dr Wallersteiner had bought a company called Hartley Baird Ltd using money from the company itself, in contravention of the prohibitions on financial assistance (under Companies Act 1948 s 54 and 190). He had got 80% of the company. Mr Moir was one of the 20% remainder shareholders. Wanting to expose Dr Wallersteiner's various dealings, he circulated a letter to shareholders. Dr Wallersteiner sued for libel.

Mr Moir counterclaimed, and joined two of his companies as defendants, for £500,000 to be repaid. In a first judgment (Wallersteiner v Moir) the Court of Appeal held that the libel action would be struck out for deliberate delay and awarded £235,000 in damages to Mr Moir, but gave Dr Wallersteiner leave to defend the remaining issues, including fraud. Dr Wallersteiner claimed that interest could not be awarded under Law Reform (Miscellaneous Provisions) Act 1934. As this was going on, Mr Moir was running out of money and made an application for funds to continue the action.

== Judgment ==
The Court of Appeal held, after noting that interest was awardable under the court's equitable jurisdiction, that Mr Moir could be indemnified by the company for his costs. Since the derivative claim meant the company was proceeding against Dr Wallersteiner, Mr Moir was ineligible for legal aid. Moreover, contingency fee arrangements with Mr Moir's lawyers could not be sanctioned (although Lord Denning MR opined that public policy might approve it in some derivative claims). Hence, the costs of litigation for minority shareholders would be indemnified by the company.

On the problem of a derivative claim, and the question of funding by the company, Lord Denning MR said the following.

It is a fundamental principle of our law that a company is a legal person, with its own corporate identity, separate and distinct from the directors or shareholders, and with its own property rights and interests to which alone it is entitled. If it is defrauded by a wrongdoer, the company itself is the one person to sue for the damage. Such is the rule in Foss v Harbottle (1843) 2 Hare 461. The rule is easy enough to apply when the company is defrauded by outsiders. The company itself is the only person who can sue. Likewise, when it is defrauded by insiders of a minor kind, once again the company is the only person who can sue. But suppose it is defrauded by insiders who control its affairs - by directors who hold a majority of the shares - who then can sue for damages? Those directors are themselves the wrongdoers. If a board meeting is held, they will not authorise the proceedings to be taken by the company against themselves. If a general meeting is called, they will vote down any suggestion that the company should sue them themselves. Yet the company is the one person who is damnified. It is the one person who should sue. In one way or another some means must be found for the company to sue. Otherwise the law would fail in its purpose. Injustice would be done without redress. In Foss v Harbottle, 2 Hare 461, 491-492, Sir James Wigram V.-C. saw the problem and suggested a solution. He thought that the company could sue "in the name of some one whom the law has appointed to be its representative." A suit could be brought

"by individual corporators in their private characters, and asking in such character the protection of those rights to which in their corporate character they were entitled...."

This suggestion found its fulfilment in the Merryweather case which came before Sir William Page Wood VC on two occasions: see (1864) 2 Hem. & M. 254 (sub nom. East Pant Du United Lead Mining Co Ltd v Merryweather) and LR 5 Eq 464n. It was accepted there that the minority shareholders might file a bill asking leave to use the name of the company: see 2 Hem & M 254, 259; L.R. 5 Eq. 467-468n . If they showed reasonable ground for charging the directors with fraud, the court would appoint the minority shareholders as representatives of the company to bring proceedings in the name of the company against the wrong doing directors. By that means the company would sue in its own name for the wrong done to it. That would be, however, a circuitous course, as Lord Hatherley L.C. said himself, at any rate in cases where the fraud itself could be proved on the initial application...

Now that the principle is recognised. it has important consequences which have hitherto not been perceived. The first is that the minority shareholder, being an agent acting on behalf of the company, is entitled to be indemnified by the company against all costs and expenses reasonably incurred by him in the course of the agency. This indemnity does not arise out of a contract express or implied, but it arises on the plainest principles of equity. It is analogous to the indemnity to which a trustee is entitled from his cestui que trust who is sui juris: see Hardoon v Belilios [1901] AC 118 and In re Richardson, Ex parte Governors of St. Thomas's Hospital [1911] 2 KB 705 . Seeing that, if the action succeeds, the whole benefit will go to the company, it is only just that the minority shareholder should be indemnified against the costs he incurs on its behalf. If the action succeeds, the wrongdoing director will be ordered to pay the costs: but if they are not recovered from him, they should be paid by the company. and all the additional costs (over and above party and party costs) should be taxed on a common fund basis and paid by the company: see Simpson and Miller v British Industries Trust Ltd (1923) 39 TLR 286 . The solicitor will have a charge on the money recovered through his instrumentality: see section 73 of the Solicitors Act 1974.

But what if the action fails? Assuming that the minority shareholder had reasonable grounds for bringing the action - that it was a reasonable and prudent course to take in the interests of the company - he should not himself be liable to pay the costs of the other side, but the company itself should be liable, because he was acting for it and not for himself. In addition, he should himself be indemnified by the company in respect of his own costs even if the action fails. It is a well known maxim of the law that he who would take the benefit of a venture if it succeeds ought also to bear the burden if it fails. Qui sentit commodum sentire debet et onus. This indemnity should extend to his own costs taxed on a common fund basis.

In order to be entitled to this indemnity, the minority shareholder soon after issuing his writ should apply for the sanction of the court in somewhat the same way as a trustee does: see In re Beddoe, Downes v Cottam [1893] 1 Ch 547, 557-558. In a derivative action, I would suggest this procedure: the minority shareholder should apply ex parte to the master for directions, supported by an opinion of counsel as to whether there is a reasonable case or not. The master may then, if he thinks fit, straightaway approve the continuance of the proceedings until close of pleadings, or until after discovery or until trial (rather as a legal aid committee does). The master need not, however, decide it ex parte. He can, if he thinks fit, require notice to be given to one or two of the other minority shareholders - as representatives of the rest - so as to see if there is any reasonable objection. (In this very case another minority shareholder took this very point in letters to us). But this preliminary application should be simple and inexpensive. It should not be allowed to escalate into a minor trial. The master should simply ask himself: is there a reasonable case for the minority shareholder to bring at the expense (eventually) of the company? If there is, let it go ahead.

== See also ==
- UK company law
- Littlewoods Mail Order Stores v IRC [1969] 1 WLR 1241
