= Wallersteiner v Moir =

- Court: Court of Appeal
- Citation: [1974] 1 WLR 991

Case opinions
- Lord Denning MR, Buckley LJ and Scarman LJ

Keywords
- Fraud, lifting the veil

Wallersteiner v Moir [1974] 1 WLR 991 is a UK company law case concerning piercing the corporate veil.

This case was followed by a connected decision, Wallersteiner v Moir (No 2), that concerned the principles behind a derivative claim.

== Facts ==
Dr Wallersteiner had bought a company called Hartley Baird Ltd using money from the company itself, in contravention of the prohibitions on financial assistance (under Companies Act 1948 s 54 and 190). He had got 80% of the company. Mr Moir was one of the 20% remainder shareholders. Wanting to expose Dr Wallersteiner's various dealings, he circulated a letter to shareholders. Dr Wallersteiner sued for libel.

== Judgment ==
Geoffrey Lane J at first instance struck out the claim for want of prosecution, as it was apparent that Dr Wallersteiner was just biding time. But he also entered judgment against Dr Wallersteiner. He appealed.

Lord Denning MR in a condemnatory judgment held that Dr Wallersteiner's delays were "intentional and contumelious", and the action for libel should be struck out. In the course of the conclusion he noted that various Liechtensteinian companies which Dr Wallersteiner held, could be accessed to get back the ill-gotten gains, and he thought so on this basis. He went on,

I am prepared to accept that the English concerns — those governed by English company law or its counterparts in Nassau or Nigeria — were distinct legal entities. I am not so sure about the Liechtenstein concerns — such as the Rothschild Trust, the Cellpa Trust or Stawa A.G. There was no evidence before us of Liechtenstein law. I will assume, too, that they were distinct legal entities, similar to an English limited company. Even so, I am quite clear that they were just the puppets of Dr. Wallersteiner. He controlled their every movement. Each danced to his bidding. He pulled the strings. No one else got within reach of them. Transformed into legal language, they were his agents to do as he commanded. He was the principal behind them. I am of the opinion that the court should pull aside the corporate veil and treat these concerns as being his creatures – for whose doings he should be, and is, responsible.

== See also ==
- UK company law
- Wallersteiner v Moir (No 2) [1975] QB 373, a successor case concerning a derivative claim that Dr Wallersteiner also lost
- Littlewoods Mail Order Stores v IRC [1969] 1 WLR 1241
