= Maughan =

Maughan may refer to:

== Places ==
- Maughan, Alberta, Canada
- Lake Maughan or Mount Parker (Cotabato), stratovolcano on Mindanao island in the Philippines

== Other uses ==
- Maughan (surname)
- The Maughan Library, a 19th-century neo-Gothic library of King's College London located on Chancery Lane in the City of London

== See also ==
- Maghan
- Maugham
- Mawgan
- Monaghan
