= Escape from the Shadows =

1972 autobiography by Robin Maugham

- Escape From The Shadows book cover
- Author: Robin Maugham
- Language: English
- Genre: Autobiography
- Publisher: Hodder & Stoughton
- Publication date: 1972
- Publication place: London, England
- Pages: 278
- ISBN: 978-0-340-14949-2

Escape from the Shadows is the 1972 autobiography of British author Robin Maugham (1916–1981), later the 2nd Viscount Maugham.

The title refers to three huge shadows over Maugham’s life: his famous father, Frederic Maugham, 1st Viscount Maugham; his uncle, writer W. Somerset Maugham; and his homosexuality. Escape from the Shadows was published by Hodder & Stoughton. It was praised for its honesty, and depicts Maugham's struggles with alcohol and ill health, and sexual ambiguity.

Maugham wrote a sequel autobiography, Search for Nirvana, which was published by W. H. Allen & Co. in 1975.
