= Sidebottom v Kershaw, Leese & Co Ltd =

- Court: Court of Appeal
- Citation: [1920] 1 Ch 154

Sidebottom v Kershaw, Leese & Co Ltd [1920] 1 Ch 154 is a UK company law case, concerning the alteration of a company's constitution, and the rights of a minority shareholder.

== Facts ==
The company's articles of association were changed to allow for the compulsory purchase of shares of any shareholder who was competing with the company. One shareholder was competing with the company and challenged the alteration. He argued that a previous case, Brown v British Abrasive Wheel Co where a change for compulsory share purchase was held invalid as not being bona fide for the benefit of the company as a whole, should be applied here too.

== Judgment ==
The Court of Appeal held that the article alteration was clearly valid, and very much for the benefit of the company. The court made clear that in Brown v British Abrasive Wheel Co Ashbury J had been wrong to regard good faith alterations and the company’s benefit as two separate ideas. The important question was whether the alteration for the benefit of the company as a whole.

== See also ==
- UK company law
- Allen v Gold Reefs of West Africa Ltd [1900] 1 Ch 656
- Brown v British Abrasive Wheel Co [1919] 1 Ch 290
- Shuttleworth v Cox Bros and Co (Maidenhead) [1927] 1 Ch 154
- Southern Foundries (1926) Ltd v Shirlaw [1940] AC 701
- Greenhalgh v Arderne Cinemas Ltd [1951] Ch 286
