= Shuttleworth v Cox Bros & Co (Maidenhead) Ltd =

Shuttleworth v Cox Bros and Co (Maidenhead) [1927] 1 Ch 154 is a UK company law case, concerning alteration of a company's constitution.

== Facts ==
Cox Bros and Co (Maidenhead) had appointed a board of directors for life, and had fixed this under its articles of association. Then it proposed to amend its articles so that a director would lose his position if the other directors requested in writing for him to resign. Mr Shuttleworth, who was targeted by the changes, brought a claim alleging that the alteration of the articles was not bona fide for the benefit of the company as a whole.

== Judgment ==
The Court of Appeal dismissed the appeal holding that the alteration of the articles was bona fide for the benefit of the company and was valid. It reaffirmed the bona fide test laid down in Sidebottom v Kershaw, Leese & Co.

Bankes L.J.:

"So the test is whether the alteration of the articles was in the opinion of the shareholders for the benefit of the company. By what criterion is the Court to ascertain the opinion of the shareholders upon this question? The alteration may be so oppressive as to cast suspicion on the honesty of the persons responsible for it, or so extravagant that no reasonable men could really consider it for the benefit of the company. In such cases the Court is, I think, entitled to treat the conduct of shareholders as it does the verdict of a jury, and to say that the alteration of a company's articles shall not stand if it is such that no reasonable men could consider it for the benefit of the company. Or, if the facts should raise the question, the Court may be able to apply another test - namely, whether or not the action of the shareholders is capable of being considered for the benefit of the company. I cannot agree with what seems to have been the view of Peterson J. in Dafen Tinplate Co. v. Llanelly Steel Co. that whenever the Court and the shareholders may differ in opinion upon what is for the benefit of the company, the view of the Court must prevail. In the present case it seems to me impossible to say that the action of these defendants was either incapable of being for the benefit of the company or such that no reasonable men could consider it for the benefit of the company. It is idle to say that their action was directed against the plaintiff, because the more outrageous the conduct of a director the more certain it is that his removal will be bona fide for the benefit of the company, and the more certainly will the efforts of the shareholders, acting bona fide and for the benefit of the company, be directed against him, because it is necessary to protect the company against such conduct for the future. For these reasons I am of opinion that this appeal must be dismissed."

== Bona Fide Intentions Test ==
It is important to understand however that this case and Sidebottom before it, established one of the two limbs of the modern day bona fide intentions test. The bona fide test comprises two tests. One objective (as this case and Sidebottom established) and one subjective test. Greenhalgh v Ardene Cinemas established the subjective limb of the bona fide test. The bona fide test is thus a hybrid of these two methods of assessment.

== See also ==
- UK company law
- Allen v Gold Reefs of West Africa Ltd [1900] 1 Ch 656
- Brown v British Abrasive Wheel Co [1919] 1 Ch 290
- Sidebottom v Kershaw, Leese & Co Ltd [1920] 1 Ch 154
- Southern Foundries (1926) Ltd v Shirlaw [1940] AC 701
- Greenhalgh v Arderne Cinemas Ltd [1951] Ch 286
