= Panic of 1826 =

19th century financial crisis in the United States

The Panic of 1826 was a financial crisis built upon fraudulent financial practices from the management of various firms. The height of the panic occurred during July 1826 when six of the sixty-seven companies publicly traded on the New York Stock Exchange abruptly failed. Within the coming months, twelve more NYSE firms would also fail. The panic sparked New York State to bring in extensive legislation seeking to regulate financial companies and protect investor interests. These regulations, legislation, and precedents like the shareholder derivative precedent were some of the first ever enacted in America and provided the basis for the regulations introduced after the panic of 2008.

== Causes ==
One of the primary causes of the Panic of 1826 was the rise in the number of incorporations in New York during the 1820s. From having only one bank and no insurance corporations in 1791, by 1830, there were over 150 financial companies and 1000 businesses. With this rise in number of incorporations, there were no statutes to protect stockholders and creditors as financial reporting and accounting standards did not exist. This spike in financial incorporations, specifically during the period from early 1824 to mid-1825, led to a 60% increase in market value of the New York Stock Exchange from 1824 to 1825. The rise of these new financial companies and how they were managed led to the eventual failure of these new firms.

The founders of the financial companies in the 1820s utilized lending and stock notes to retain full control of the firm and to vote themselves into the office of directors. Once they were able to establish majority ownership, the speculative owners were able to use their corporation's resources as collateral to finance their own acquisitions and personal investing. Through borrowing on collateral and shifting assets around, the controlling investors were able to maintain directorships in a large number of firms. In the month of July 1826, there was a series of runs on three critical banks, which led to a halting of payments and the collapse of companies controlled by these investors. In a study regarding detailing shareholder ownership during the 1820s, it was shown how director of firms that failed controlled 62% of the share in their companies, which was double the proportion of the surviving firms.

== Effects and aftermath ==
The Panic of 1826 led to proposed measures revolving around statutes for capital, financial statements, liabilities of financial institutions, and regulations for directors. Some of these new statutes mandated that a transfer of a corporation's property of one thousand dollars or more required the approval of the entire board and made directors personally liable for any losses from violations. This led to the revision of existing bank's charters and the institution of a safety fund law, which created an administrative office to oversee and inspect the banks.

Besides regulations, the public sought to pursue criminal cases against a number of directors. In September 1826, trials began involving Henry Eckford and seven other defendants, who were charged with conspiracy. Throughout the trial, evidence and testimony was presented, revealing excessive lending to finance speculative investment, fraudulent sale of securities, and manipulation of assets. However, one of the verdicts was appealed to the state's highest court where they ruled that the conspiracy indictment was too vague, which led to a precedent and the shutting down of all related cases. This ruling prompted the Revised Statutes to include a provision allowing investors and creditors of a fraudulent corporation to use courts to shut down the firm's operations and recover their assets. The provision established the idea of minority investors being able to sue directors for a breach of fiduciary trust. This marked the development of the shareholders’ derivative suit.

Although the Panic of 1826 was not the first documented case of mismanagement by firms, these legal regulations against corporations were some of the first to be ever enacted in the United States. The Panic of 1826 was the first of many nineteenth century financial crises, and each of these subsequent crises built upon the regulations and legislation from this panic of Wall Street Firms abruptly going bankrupt.

== See also ==
- Panic of 1819
- Panic of 1857
- Panic of 1825
- Derivative suit
