= John Leonard Knox =

British High Court judge

Sir John Knox

Justice of the High Court
- In office 26 July 1985 – 30 September 1996

Personal details
- Born: John Leonard Knox; 6 April 1925
- Died: 28 May 2015 (aged 90) St Clare's Care Home; East Sussex
- Occupation: Judge
- Profession: Barrister

Sir John Leonard Knox (6 April 1925 – 28 May 2015) was a British High Court judge, sitting in the Chancery division.

== Biography ==
Knox was the son of Capt. Leonard Needham Knox of an Ulster-Scots origin and Berthe Hélène Brel of Lille. His paternal grandmother was the poet Lucy Knox. He was the great-great-grandson of Thomas Knox, 1st Earl of Ranfurly. He was educated at Radley College and Worcester College, Oxford. He served in the Royal Artillery from 1944–47.

Prior to his elevation to the bench, Sir John practised as a barrister from what is now termed Radcliffe Chambers.

He was Attorney-General of the Duchy of Lancaster from 1984 to 1986.

He was appointed on 26 July 1985, and retired on 30 September 1996. Whilst sitting he was styled as Mr Justice Knox or Knox J.

== Personal life ==
Knox married firstly in 1953 Anne Jacqueline Mackintosh (died 1991), daughter of Herbert Mackintosh. They had one son and three daughters. He married secondly in 1993 Benedicta Eugénie, daughter of oboist Léon Goossens and widow of Robin Philip Cooksey.

== Notable cases ==
Notable judicial decisions that Knox J was involved in included:

- Smith v Croft (No 2) [1988] Ch 114 relating to derivative claims.
- Re Produce Marketing Consortium Ltd (No 2) [1989] 5 BCC 569 relating to wrongful trading.
- Re New Bullas Trading Ltd [1994] 1 BCLC 485 at first instance, relating to floating charges. Knox J's decision at first instance was reversed by the Court of Appeal, but that decision was later overruled by the House of Lords in Re Spectrum Plus Ltd [2005] UKHL 41, effectively validating Knox J's original decision.
- Re MC Bacon Ltd (No 1) [1990] BCLC 324 at the preliminary strike-out stage, relating to wrongful trading and unfair preferences.
- Re Curtain Dream plc [1990] BCLC 925 in relation to recharacterisation.

== Arms ==
Coat of arms of John Leonard Knox

Motto
Moveo Et Proficior

Legal offices
Preceded by Sir Richard Scott	Attorney-General of the Duchy of Lancaster; 1989-1991	Succeeded by Sir Donald Rattee
