= McDonald v Horn =

- Court: Court of Appeal
- Citation: [1995] 1 All ER 961

Keywords
- Pensions, breach of trust

McDonald v Horn [1995] 1 All ER 961 is an English trusts law case on pensions, relevant for UK labour law. It enables the beneficiaries of a pension fund to be indemnified for costs in bringing actions for breach of trust, fiduciary duty or the duty of care against the trustees or directors of a pension fund.

== Facts ==
McDonald and other members of a pension scheme claimed that their employers, pension fund trustees and others breached duties in the investment of the trust funds and use of their powers for improper purposes.

== Judgment ==
=== High Court ===
Vinelott J held that a pre-emptive costs order would be made, where the costs of the beneficiaries, and costs they might be ordered to pay by the defendants should be paid on an indemnity basis out of the pension fund. The defendants appeal.

=== Court of Appeal ===
The Court of Appeal held that the appeal should be dismissed, and considering the court’s jurisdiction to deal with costs under the Supreme Court Act 1981 s 51, general principles under the RSC Ord.62 r.3 and special principles relating to trustees and other fiduciaries under Ord.62 r.6 there was an analogy between pensions as a special form of trust and companies with shareholders. Following Wallersteiner v Moir (No 2) a minority shareholder bringing a derivative action on behalf of a company was entitled to be indemnified out of the assets against his costs, and the same principle could legitimately be applied in the case of an action by a pension fund member with only limited means acting on behalf of many others who had an interest in the fund.

Hoffmann LJ said the following:

...

(c) Extension of special principle to derivative action

The plaintiffs however pray in aid the analogy of Ord. 62, r. 6(2) by a different route. In Wallersteiner v. Moir (No. 2) [1975] Q.B. 373 the Court of Appeal said that a minority shareholder bringing a derivative action on behalf of a company could obtain the authority of the court to sue as if he were a trustee suing on behalf of a fund, with the same entitlement to be indemnified out of the assets against his costs and any costs he may be ordered to pay to the other party. The court said that the minority shareholder could make a Beddoe application in the same way as a trustee and so secure an assurance that he would not be personally liable for any costs. The plaintiffs here say that this procedure, imported into company law from trusts, should be re-exported to trust law to cover the position of a beneficiary who is suing on behalf of a fund in which he and many others have interests.

(d) Extension of Wallersteiner v. Moir (No. 2) to pension funds

The defendants say that such a re-exportation is quite illegitimate. The point about a derivative action is that the plaintiff is asserting a cause of action which really belongs to a different person, namely, the company. He has no substantive cause of action of his own. The derivative action is a procedural device to allow the company to sue when its normal organs of control are in the hands of the alleged wrongdoers. In trust proceedings, on the other hand, beneficiaries such as the plaintiffs each have their own cause of action. The proceedings are simply hostile litigation directly between beneficiaries and trustees. It is well established that in such cases costs should follow the event and not come out of the fund: see Williams v. Jones (1886) 34 Ch.D. 120.

On the other hand, if one looks at the economic relationships involved, there does seem to me a compelling analogy between a minority shareholder's action for damages on behalf of the company and an action by a member of a pension fund to compel trustees or others to account to the fund. In both cases a person with a limited interest in a fund, whether the company's assets or pension fund, is alleging injury to the fund as a whole and seeking restitution on behalf of the fund. And what distinguishes the shareholder and pension fund member on the one hand from the ordinary trust beneficiary on the other is that the former have both given consideration for their interests. They are not just recipients of the settlor's bounty which he, for better or worse, has entrusted to the control of trustees of his choice. The relationship between the parties is a commercial one and the pension fund members are entitled to be satisfied that the fund is being properly administered. Even in a non-contributory scheme, the employer's payments are not bounty. They are part of the consideration for the services of the employee.

Pension funds are such a special form of trust, and the analogy between them and companies with shareholders is so much stronger than in the case of ordinary trusts, that in my judgment it would do no violence to established authority if we were to apply to them the Wallersteiner v. Moir procedure. Mr. Sher, who appeared for the defendants, said that this court had no jurisdiction to do this. He referred us to the statement of the limits of the court's inherent jurisdiction over trusts in the decision of the House of Lords in Chapman v. Chapman [1954] A.C. 429 . But I say that the jurisdiction is to be found in section 51 of the Supreme Court Act 1981, which is subject only to rules of court and established principles. For the reasons I have given, I think that no such rule or principle would be violated.

8. Exercise of discretion

The judge identified various factors which he regarded as material to the exercise of the discretion. He said that in the case of a pension fund the trust beneficiaries were not mere volunteers. They had contributed to the fund and had a moral right to be satisfied that it was being properly administered. The plaintiffs were bringing an action “on behalf of the trust estate” and should therefore enjoy the same right to an indemnity out of the fund as if they were trustees. As appears from what I have already said, I think that these are the features which, in combination, enable the case to be brought within the Wallersteiner principle. They are pre-conditions of the existence of the discretion rather than factors to be taken into account in its exercise.

The judge went on to say that, on the pleadings and documentary evidence, the claims “could not lightly be dismissed.” It was “simply inconceivable” that an independent trustee would not be authorised by the court to pursue the claims, at least until the completion of discovery. The plaintiffs were impecunious and unless the litigation were funded “serious claims will never be investigated.” This last factor can of course never in itself be a reason for a pre-emptive order: it is unfortunately often the case that serious claims can never be investigated because the plaintiffs do not have money or access to legal aid. But in a case within the extended Wallersteiner principle, it is relevant to the exercise of the discretion.

Mr. Sher submitted in the alternative that, even if there was a discretion to make a Wallersteiner order, it should still not have been made. He says that the employer companies have a residuary interest in the fund after the defined earnings-related interests of the members have been satisfied. Therefore any payment out of the fund towards the plaintiffs' costs is likely, one way or another, to be at the expense of the defendant employers. If on eventual winding up there is a surplus for the employers, it will be a smaller surplus because of the payment of costs. If there is a deficit which the employers have to meet, it will be larger. The employers are therefore being put in a position in which, win or lose, all the costs will come out of “their” money. Mr. Sher says that it is not fair that hostile litigation should be conducted on this basis. He cited the analogy of In re Evans, decd. [1986] 1 W.L.R. 101 in which the Court of Appeal discharged a Beddoe order which authorised executors to defend proceedings in which the plaintiffs claimed to be beneficially entitled to the whole estate. The effect was that the plaintiffs if they won would still pay all the costs and the other beneficiaries would have the claim resisted on their behalf without any risk as to costs. The Court of Appeal said that, if the other beneficiaries were joined as defendants, it would be fairer to leave them to decide whether to defend at their own risk.

Mr. Etherton, for the plaintiffs, denied that the costs would inevitably be borne by the employers. He said that it might reduce a surplus which could otherwise be used to augment benefits and he submitted that the new definitive deed, if valid, gave the employers the power to reduce accrued benefits. Mr. Sher disavowed any such power and I am willing to accept that it is likely that, when and if this fund is wound up, the expenditure on costs will reduce what would otherwise be available for the employer companies. Alternatively, it may advance the date at which the employer companies have to contribute to the fund and the contribution holiday which they have enjoyed ever since the M.M.L. take-over will come to an end. Nevertheless, I think that the judge was entitled in his discretion to make the order which he did. The court in In re Evans did not disapprove of the decision of Sir Robert Megarry V.-C. in In re Dallaway, decd. [1982] 1 W.L.R. 756, in which executors were authorised to defend a similar claim to the whole estate. It said that the matter was one of discretion. In the case of a pension fund, it seems to me reasonable for the court to have power to make an order which will result in the costs of reasonable and bona fide proceedings becoming a cost of the administration of the fund. I do not therefore think that the employers' residuary interest in a winding up of the fund in principle precluded Vinelott J. from making a pre-emptive order. In my view he acted within his discretion.

9. Practice

The power to make a Wallersteiner v. Moir order in a pension fund case should in my view be exercised with considerable care. The judgment of Walton J. in Smith v. Croft [1986] 1 W.L.R. 580 contains a useful reminder of the dangers of too easily making orders which allow minority shareholders to litigate at the cost of the company. He said that such applications should be made inter partes and this is reflected in the draft of the proposed new Ord. 15, r. 12A dealing with the procedure for derivative actions. I think that a similar procedure should be followed in pension fund litigation, as indeed it was in this case.

The need for caution in making such orders does not however mean that the judge or master should undertake a close examination of the merits of the dispute. The question is whether the plaintiffs have shown a sufficient case for further investigation. Once the judge is satisfied that there are matters which need to be investigated, caution should take the form of choosing the most economical form of investigation. This will not necessarily involve authorising a full trial or even full pleadings and discovery. The court should not authorise any legal process until it has explored, as Vinelott J. did in this case, the possibility of independent investigation by a person or persons acceptable to both parties. In the normal case I would not expect any proceedings to be authorised until such an independent investigation had been completed. It is unfortunate that in this case the proposal was unsuccessful. I have the impression from what I have seen of the evidence and the way the case was put by Mr. Sher that the defendants have taken the view that, provided the fund was in surplus, the way in which it was invested and administered was none of the plaintiffs' business. This attitude is unacceptable: the whole fund is a trust fund, whatever may be the beneficial interests on a winding up, and the members are entitled to openness in the way it is run. I should have thought that in future cases trustees and employers who are concerned that the costs are coming out of “their” money will be more ready to save costs by providing full information and if necessary agreeing to an independent investigation of the plaintiffs' complaints at an early stage.

Even if further investigation is required, it need not necessarily take the form of a full scale trial. The court might in the first instance authorise only discovery (preferably limited to specific issues and kinds of documents) or, as in this case, appoint judicial trustees with power to take possession of the documents and investigate for themselves. The court may also think, as Vinelott J. did here, that, if the action is to be pursued beyond the stage of investigation and discovery, it should be put into the hands of independent judicial trustees, in which case the pre-emptive costs order will expire when the hand-over has been completed. This too should be achieved in the most economical way: there seems to me no reason why the judicial trustees should not take over the solicitors and counsel who have been acting for the plaintiffs. In this case I understand that the defendants objected, which will have considerably increased the costs.

In general the court hearing an application such as this should try to secure the fairest and most economical judicial or extra-judicial resolution *701 of the dispute. This, it seems to me, is precisely what Vinelott J. has done and I can find no fault with the exercise of his discretion. I would dismiss the appeal.

Balcombe LJ and Hirst LJ agreed.

== See also ==
- English trusts law
- UK labour law
- UK company law
