= Allen v Gold Reefs of West Africa Ltd =

United Kingdom company law case in 1900

- Court: Court of Appeal of England and Wales
- Citation: [1900] 1 Ch 656

Case opinions
- Lord Lindley MR

Allen v Gold Reefs of West Africa Ltd [1900] 1 Ch 656 is a UK company law case concerning alteration of a company's articles of association. It held that alterations could not be interfered with by the court unless the change that had been made was not bona fide for the benefit of the company as a whole. This rule served as a marginal form of minority shareholder protection at common law, before the existence of any unfair prejudice remedy.

== Facts ==
Gold Reefs’ articles gave it a "first and paramount lien" (the right to retain possession) on all partly paid shares held by any member for any debt owed to the company. Mr Zuccani held some partly paid up shares. He also owned the only fully paid up shares issued by the company. He died insolvent. The company altered its articles by special resolution to create a lien on all fully paid shares (deleting the words in brackets of ‘upon all shares (not fully paid) held by such members’). Mr Allen, one of the executors of Mr Zuccani (trying to get money back) sued to get the fully paid shares’ value.

Kekewich J held the company could not enforce the lien. The company appealed.

== Judgment ==
Lord Lindley MR held the alteration of the company's articles was valid to introduce a lien on fully paid up shares. So long as the resolution was done bona fide for the benefit of the company as a whole, restrictions on freedom of a company to alter its articles are invalid. According to Lord Lindley MR the power to change the articles is,

like all other powers [to] be exercised to those general principles of law and equity which are applicable to all powers conferred on majorities and enabling them to bind minorities. It must be exercised, not only in the manner required by law, but also bona fide for the benefit of the company as a whole, and it must not be exceeded. These conditions are always implied, and are seldom, if ever, expressed...

How shares shall be transferred, and whether the company shall have any lien on them, are clearly matters of regulation properly prescribed by a company’s articles of association...

It is easy to imagine cases in which even a member of a company may acquire by contract or otherwise special rights against the company, which exclude him from the operation of a subsequently altered article...

The altered articles applied to all holders of fully paid shares, and made no distinction between them. The directors cannot be charged with bad faith.

Romer LJ agreed. Vaughan Williams LJ dissented.

== Significance ==
- Allen v Gold Reefs of West Africa Ltd [1900] 1 Ch 656, inserting a lien on shares fully paid when it only affected one shareholder was valid
- Brown v British Abrasive Wheel Co [1919] 1 Ch 290, introducing a 'squeeze out' provision to compulsorily acquire the 2% of shares held by a minority bidder to encourage the 98% majority shareholder to contribute more capital was invalid
- Sidebottom v Kershaw, Leese & Co Ltd [1920] 1 Ch 154, introducing the right to compulsorily acquire the shares of anybody running a competing business was valid
- Shuttleworth v Cox Bros and Co (Maidenhead) [1927] 1 Ch 154, allowing a majority of directors to remove another director, to target one of the existing directors, was valid, as it was bona fide.
- Peter's American Delicacy Co Ltd v Heath (1939) 61 CLR 457, an amendment to rectify a drafting mistake on the distribution ratios to be equal, and dependent on amounts paid up not nominal value, for both capitalised profits as for cash dividends was valid
- Southern Foundries (1926) Ltd v Shirlaw [1940] AC 701, changing the articles to allow a director to be removed before the end of his term was valid
- Greenhalgh v Arderne Cinemas Ltd [1951] Ch 286, removing a pre-emption right to prevent a minority shareholder buying up shares in a battle for control was valid
- Rights and Issues Investment Trust Ltd v Stylo Shoes Ltd [1965] Ch 250, doubling voting rights of management shares to preserve their strength after a large new share issue when managers did not take part in the vote was valid
- Gambotto v WPC Ltd (1995) 182 CLR 432, an alteration to empower the majority to compulsorily buy out any minority was invalid. The Australian High Court preferred a test of whether an alteration is 'beyond any purpose contemplated by the articles or oppressive'
- Citco Banking Corporation NV v Pusser's Ltd [2007] UKPC 13, an amendment passed by 84% of shareholders except Citco to create a new class of shares with 50 votes each and to convert the chairman's 200,000 shares into this class was valid

== See also ==
- UK company law
