= Brown v British Abrasive Wheel Co =

1919 UK company law case

Brown v British Abrasive Wheel Co [1919] 1 Ch 290 is a UK company law case, concerning the validity of an alteration to a company's constitution, which adversely affect the interests of one of the shareholders.

== Facts ==
British Abrasive Wheel Co needed to raise further capital. The 98% majority were willing to provide this capital if they could buy up the 2% minority. Having failed to effect this buying agreement, the 98% purposed to change the articles of association to give them the power to purchase the shares of the minority. The proposed article provided for the compulsory purchase of the minority's shares on certain terms. However, the majority were prepared to insert a provision regarding price which stated that the minority would get a price which the court thought was fair.

== Judgment ==
Astbury J held that the alteration was not for the benefit of the company as a whole and could not be made. One reason for this was that there was no direct link between the provision of the extra capital and the alteration of the articles. Although the whole scheme had been to provide the capital after removing the dissenting shareholders, it would in fact have been possible to remove the shareholders and then refuse to provide the capital.

== See also ==
- UK company law
- Allen v Gold Reefs of West Africa Ltd [1900] 1 Ch 656
- Sidebottom v Kershaw, Leese & Co Ltd [1920] 1 Ch 154
- Shuttleworth v Cox Bros and Co (Maidenhead) [1927] 1 Ch 154
- Southern Foundries (1926) Ltd v Shirlaw [1940] AC 701
- Greenhalgh v Arderne Cinemas Ltd [1951] Ch 286
