= Smith v Croft (No 2) =

- Citation: [1988] Ch 114

Court membership
- Judge sitting: Knox J

Keywords
- derivative claim

Smith v Croft (No 2) [1988] Ch 114 is a UK company law case concerning derivative claims. Its principle that in allowing a derivative claim to continue the court will have regard to the majority of the minority's views has been codified in Companies Act 2006, section 263(4).

== Facts ==
Minority shareholders claimed to recover money paid away contrary to the financial assistance prohibition (now found at section 678 of the Companies Act 2006) and being ultra vires. They had 14% of the company's shares, the defendants held 63%, and another shareholder, who did not want litigation, held 21%.

== Judgment ==
Knox J held that if the claimants were a minority even after the wrongdoers were taken out of the equation, then there is no right to sue, even with a Foss v Harbottle exception. Independence is a question of fact. He followed Burland v Earle in Lord Davey’s dicta that shareholders cannot have a bigger right to sue than the company with its procedural and substantive limitations.

== Significance ==
The case was cited in the Law Commission Shareholder Remedies Report in regards to the amount of court time involved:

In the consultation paper we identified two main problems. The first is the obscurity and complexity of the law relating to the ability of a shareholder to bring proceedings on behalf of his company. He may wish to do so to enforce liability for a breach by one of the directors of his duties to the company.

Generally it is for the company itself, acting in accordance with the will of the majority of its members, to bring any such proceedings. This is as a result of principles commonly known as the rule in Foss v Harbottle (1843) 2 Hare 461.

However, if the wrongdoing director(s) control the majority of votes they may prevent legal proceedings being brought. There are therefore exceptions to the rule which enable a minority shareholder to bring an action to enforce the company’s rights. But our provisional view was that the law relating to these exceptions is rigid, old fashioned and unclear.

We pointed out that it is inaccessible save to lawyers specialising in this field because, to obtain a proper understanding of it, it is necessary to examine numerous reported cases decided over a period of 150 years. We also explained that the procedure is lengthy and costly, involving a preliminary stage which in one case took 18 days of court time to resolve.

— "Shareholder Remedies Report LC246 ss1.4"

== See also ==
- UK company law
