= The Wrong People (novel) =

1967 novel by Robin Maugham

- 1971 US edition cover
- Author: Robin Maugham
- Language: English
- Genre: Gay literature; Psychological thriller
- Publisher: Paperback Library
- Publication date: 1967
- Publication place: United States
- Media type: Print (paperback)
- Pages: 190

The Wrong People is a 1967 psychological thriller novel by British author Robin Maugham. It follows Arnold Turner, a repressed English schoolmaster on holiday in Tangier, who gives in to his long-suppressed homosexual desires and subsequently becomes embroiled in a dangerous sex trafficking scheme devised by a wealthy and manipulative American expatriate, Ewing Baird. The Wrong People was originally published by Paperback Library under the pseudonym of David Griffin because of its controversial themes.

== Plot ==
British schoolteacher Arnold Turner is on holiday in Tangier when he is befriended by suave Ewing Baird, the middle-aged son of an American industrialist and a British socialite. At Ewing's villa, Arnold is immediately smitten with Riffi, Ewing's teenage Moroccan houseboy, and gives in to his long-suppressed homosexual desires. Subsequently, Ewing encourages Arnold to extend his stay and move out of his hotel and into the villa. Ewing opens up to Arnold about his previous failed relationship with a younger man named Tim Deakin, and voices his desire to find an impressionable boy whom he can educate on the arts and finer things in life. Ewing presents Arnold with an offer: Ewing will sign over his former villa in Marshan to Arnold, where he can live in bliss with Riffi, in exchange for his assistance in acquiring such a boy for Ewing. Arnold's school, Melton Hall, is for troublesome or unwanted youths from lower-class backgrounds with few or no family connections, and Ewing believes that Arnold is in the perfect position to select one of them and convince him to flee the school and join Ewing for a better life in Tangier. Arnold is shocked by the suggestion, likening it to kidnapping, and Ewing laughs that he is joking.

Riffi suddenly disappears, ostensibly to visit his family, and Arnold realizes that Ewing has manipulated him since his arrival in Tangier to be more receptive to this scheme. Ewing takes Arnold to a seedy male bordello called Diego's, and reveals that Riffi once worked there. He indicates that Riffi would likely have to go back if his employment with Ewing was terminated for some reason, and Arnold was not around to support him. Ewing admits he was not joking about his offer, and explains his plan in detail, but Arnold remains uncomfortable with the legal risks and amorality of it. Raffi returns. With the end of his trip only days away, Arnold is anguished by the thought of leaving Raffi, and begins to seriously consider Ewing's plan. An intelligent, quiet boy named Dan Gedge comes to mind. He has a bleak family situation, and is miserable at Melton Hall. Suddenly Ewing produces evidence that Riffi has been stealing cash from him, and announces that he intends to involve the police. Understanding that Riffi would end up in prison or a work gang, and be sexually abused either way, Arnold agrees to Ewing's scheme.

Four months later in England, Arnold has become closer to Dan, who is eager to pursue the offer to flee to Tangier. Arnold has done his best to explain all the realities of the situation, including that Ewing may have homosexual designs on Dan. The boy is undeterred, his only concern being that he will not be beaten. Ewing's plan is for Arnold to drive Dan from Melton Hall to Folkestone. There, Tim Deakin will take Dan to France, where they will depart from Marseille in Ewing's yacht and sail to Tangier. Ewing and Dan will then sail around the Mediterranean Sea for a few years. Meanwhile, Arnold will return to Melton Hall after the weekend, with a large payment from Ewing and the Marshan villa signed over to him. After two months, and once any drama over Dan's disappearance has died down, Arnold will resign and return to Tangier, where Riffi will be waiting.

Following Ewing's detailed plan, Arnold leaves the school for a weekend in London, but doubles back to pick up Dan at a prearranged meeting point. Dan reassures Arnold repeatedly that he wants to continue with the plan. En route, however, Arnold learns that Dan never believed Ewing was real, but instead believed that Arnold wanted to take Dan as his lover. Dan also confesses that he and another boy, Charlie Mason, were being sexually abused by their housemaster, Captain Stobart. Dan is crushed to learn that Arnold does not want him for himself, but resigns himself to continue the journey, as a life with Ewing cannot be worse than what he is leaving behind. Arnold, not attracted to Dan and irritated by this unforeseen turn of events, casually promises he will be there for Dan whenever he is needed. In Folkestone, Dan confides to Arnold that he is frightened of Tim, but Arnold reassures him that everything will be fine.

Days later, Arnold receives a letter from Dan from Tangier, saying he has changed his mind and begging Arnold to come. A guilty Arnold arranges a week-long leave from the school and gets on a plane. Arriving in Tangier, he learns from Ewing's flamboyant friend Wayne that Riffi took up with a rich English widower the month before and, though Ewing tried to stop him, left town for parts unknown. Ewing is annoyed that Arnold has endangered their plan, and dismisses Dan's letter as a bit of nerves. He mocks Arnold's sympathy for the boy, and orders him to return to England immediately, promising another payment. Ewing points out that Dan has never met him, so Arnold and Tim are the ones in danger of being implicated. When Ewing has left the room, Arnold calls the British Consulate and confesses that a runaway British schoolboy is there. Dan appears, hoping that he and Arnold can be together, but Arnold breaks the news that Dan will be returned to England, and Arnold will likely go to prison.

Some time later, Ewing has escaped the scandal unscathed.

== Development and publication ==
US first edition cover, with the pseudonym David Griffin

The Wrong People is based in part on Maugham's real-life efforts to expose the African sex trafficking trade. He wrote his first notes for the book in 1958. According to William Lawrence, Maugham's partner until his death and trustee of his estate, Maugham's uncle, writer W. Somerset Maugham, read the manuscript and commented, "They will kill you."

The novel's frank depiction of pederasty and sex trafficking were considered so scandalous that United States-based Paperback Library initially published it under the pseudonym David Griffin. It was Maugham's first explicitly gay-themed novel, and though critically praised, was also controversial because homosexuality was still illegal in Britain for most of the 1960s. Homosexual acts were partially decriminalised in England and Wales by the Sexual Offences Act 1967. The Wrong People was reprinted under Maugham's name in 1970 by Heinemann, by McGraw-Hill in 1970, by Gay Men's Press in 1986 as part of their Gay Modern Classics series, and by Valancourt Books in 2019.

== Potential adaptations ==
Maugham wrote a screenplay for a film adaptation of The Wrong People, which was optioned by actor Sal Mineo as a potential directing vehicle but never filmed. In 2019, Peccadillo Pictures optioned the novel for a potential film adaptation written and directed by British screenwriter David McGillivray. McGillivray, inspired to tackle the project after reading a biography of Mineo, said "Maugham created a moral dilemma in 1967. He handled it brilliantly, but the subject was so taboo that a film was out of the question. Now, because we're so aware of what's been covered up for years, I want to remind audiences of what this great writer said so long ago. And in addition to the issues raised, The Wrong People is also a superb suspense thriller."

== Reception ==
In 1971, Auberon Waugh of The New York Times called the novel "more honest" and "braver" than Maugham's previous works, but was surprised that it had an unhappy ending, an outdated hallmark of earlier gay literature.

Maugham's partner until his death, William Lawrence, wrote that Maugham's uncle, writer W. Somerset Maugham, described The Wrong People as "extremely well done", and that it was "the first book he'd read from beginning to end without putting it down in many years."
