= Edwards v Halliwell =

- Court: Court of Appeal of England and Wales
- Citation: [1950] 2 All ER 1064

Case opinions
- Jenkins LJ

Keywords
- Corporate litigation

Edwards v Halliwell [1950] 2 All ER 1064 is a UK labour law and UK company law case about the internal organisation of a trade union, or a company, and litigation by members to make an executive follow the organisation's internal rules.

== Facts ==
Some members of the National Union of Vehicle Builders sued the executive committee for increasing fees. Rule 19 of the union constitution required a ballot and a two-thirds approval level by members. Instead a delegate meeting had purported to allow the increase without a ballot.

== Judgment ==
Jenkins LJ granted the members' application. He held that under the rule in Foss v Harbottle the union itself is prima facie the proper plaintiff and if a simple majority can make an action binding, then no case can be brought. But there are exceptions to the rule. First, if the action is ultra vires a member may sue. Second, if the wrongdoers are in control of the union's right to sue there is a "fraud on the minority", and an individual member may take up a case. Third, as pointed out by Romer J in Cotter v National Union of Seamen a company should not be able to bypass a special procedure or majority in its own articles. This was relevant here. And fourth, as here, if there is an invasion of a personal right. Here it was a personal right that the members paid a set amount in fees and retain membership as they stood before the purported alterations.

Jenkins LJ gave the following reasons.

The rule in Foss v Harbottle, as I understand it, comes to no more than this. First, the proper plaintiff in an action in respect of a wrong alleged to be done to a company or association of persons is prima facie the company or the association of persons itself. Secondly, where the alleged wrong is a transaction which might be made binding on the company or association and all its members by a simple majority of the members, no individual member of the company is allowed to maintain an action in respect of that matter for the simple reason that, if a mere majority of the members of the company or association is in favour of what has been done, then cadit quaestio. No wrong has been done to the company or the association and there is nothing in respect of which anyone can sue. If, on the other hand, a simple majority of members of the company or association is against what has been done, then there is no reason why the company or association itself should not sue. In my judgment, it is implicit in the rule that the matter relied on as constituting the cause of action should be a cause of action properly belonging to the general body of corporators or members of the company or association as opposed to a cause of action which some individual member can assert in his own right.

The cases falling within the general ambit of the rule are subject to certain exceptions. It has been noted in the course of argument that in cases where the act complained of is wholly ultra vires the company or association, the rule has no application because there is no question of the transaction being confirmed by any majority. It has been further pointed out that where what has been done amounts to what is generally called in these cases, a fraud on the minority and the wrongdoers are themselves in control of the company, the rule is relaxed in favour of the aggrieved minority who are allowed to bring what is known as a Minority Shareholder's action on behalf of themselves and all others. The reason for this is that, if they were denied that right, their grievance would never reach the court because the wrongdoers themselves being in control, would not allow the company to sue. Those exceptions are not directly in point in this case, but they show, especially the last one, that the rule is not an inflexible rule and it will be relaxed where necessary in the interests of justice.

There is a further exception which seems to me to touch this case directly. That is the exception noted by Romer J. in Cotter v National Union of Seamen. He pointed out that the rule did not prevent an individual member from suing if the matter in respect of which he was suing was one which could validly be done or sanctioned, not by a simple majority of the members of the company or association, but only by some special majority, as, for instance, in the case of a limited company under the Companies Act, a special resolution duly passed as such. As Romer J. pointed out, the reason for that exception is clear, because otherwise, if the rule were applied in its full rigour, a company, which, by its directors, had broken its own regulations by doing something without a special resolution which could only be done validly by a special resolution could assert that it alone was the proper plaintiff in any consequent action and the effect would be to allow a company acting in breach of its articles to do de facto by ordinary resolution that which according to its own regulations could only be done by special resolution. That exception exactly fits the present case inasmuch as here the act complained of is something which could only have been validly done, not by a simple majority, but by a two-thirds majority obtained by ballot vote. In my judgment, therefore, the reliance on the rule in Foss v Harbottle in the present case may be regarded as misconceived on that ground alone.

== See also ==
- UK company law
