= Greenhalgh v Arderne Cinemas Ltd =

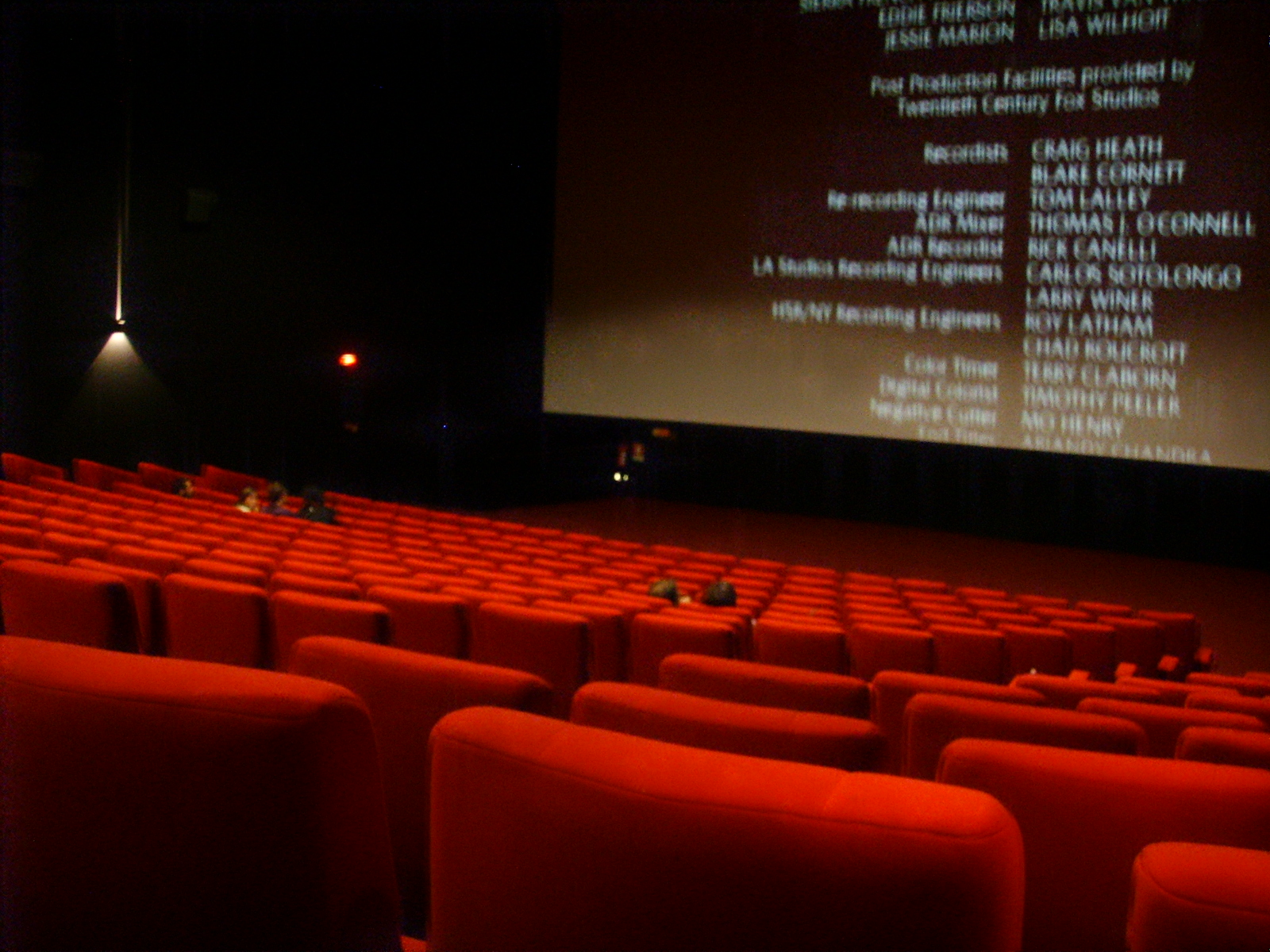
- Court: Court of Appeal
- Citation: [1946] 1 All ER 512; [1951] Ch 286, [1950] 2 All ER 1120.

Keywords
- fraud on the minority, articles of association

Greenhalgh v Arderne Cinemas Ltd (No 2) [1946] 1 All ER 512; [1951] Ch 286 is UK company law case concerning the issue of shares, and "fraud on the minority", as an exception to the rule in Foss v Harbottle.

== Facts ==
Mr Greenhalgh was a minority shareholder in Arderne Cinemas and was in a protracted battle to prevent majority shareholder, Mr Mallard selling control. The company had two classes of shares; one class was worth ten shilling a share and the other class worth two shilling a share. The ten shillings were divided into two shilling shares, and all carried one vote. Mr Greenhalgh had the previous two shilling shares, and lost control of the company.

The articles of association provided by cl. 10 (a): "No shares in the company shall be transferred to a person not a member of the company so long as a member of the company may be willing to purchase such shares at a fair value to be ascertained in accordance with sub-clause (b) hereof".

The company changed its articles by special resolution in general meeting allowing existing shareholders to offer any shares to person/members outside the company. Mr Mallard, the majority shareholder, wished to transfer his shares for 6 shillings each to Mr Sol Sheckman in return for £5000 and his resignation from the board.

Mr Greenhalgh wished to prevent control of the company going away, and argued that the article change was invalid, a fraud on him and the other minority shareholders, and asked for compensation.

== Judgments ==
=== Share issues ===
Lord Greene MR held, ‘instead of Greenhalgh finding himself in a position of control, he finds himself in a position where the control has gone, and to that extent the rights… are affected, as a matter of business. As a matter of law, I am quite unable to hold that, as a result of the transaction, the rights are varied; they remain what they always were – a right to have one vote per share pari passu with the ordinary shares for the time being issued which include the new 2s ordinary shares resulting from the subdivision.’ !

=== Derivative action ===
Lord Evershed MR (with whom Asquith and Jenkins LLJ concurred) held that the £5000 payment was not a fraud on the minority. None of the majority voters were voting for a private gain. The alteration of the articles was perfectly legitimate, because it was done properly.

Lord Evershed MR stated,

When a man comes into a company, he is not entitled to assume that the articles will always remain in a particular form, and so long as the proposed alteration does not unfairly discriminate, I do not think it is an objection, provided the resolution is bona fide passed, that the right to tender for the majority holding of shares would be lost by the lifting of the restriction [to transfer shares to individuals outside the company]

Moreover, it was wrong to say,

that a special resolution of this kind would be liable to be impeached if the effect of it were to discriminate between the majority shareholders and the minority shareholders, so as to give to the former an advantage of which the latter were deprived. When the cases are examined in which the resolution has been successfully attacked, it is on that ground. It is therefore not necessary to require that persons voting for a special resolution should, so to speak, dissociate themselves altogether from their own prospects and consider whether what is thought to be for the benefit of the company as a going concern. If, as commonly happens, an outside person makes an offer to buy all the shares, prima facie, if the corporators think it a fair offer and vote in favour of the resolution, it is no ground for impeaching the resolution that they are considering their own position as individuals.

== See also ==
- UK company law
- Allen v Gold Reefs of West Africa Ltd [1900] 1 Ch 656
- Brown v British Abrasive Wheel Co [1919] 1 Ch 290
- Sidebottom v Kershaw, Leese & Co Ltd [1920] 1 Ch 154
- Shuttleworth v Cox Bros and Co (Maidenhead) [1927] 1 Ch 154
- Southern Foundries (1926) Ltd v Shirlaw [1940] AC 701
