= Officious bystander =

The officious bystander is a metaphorical figure of English law and legal fiction, developed by MacKinnon LJ in Southern Foundries (1926) Ltd v Shirlaw to assist in determining when a term should be implied into an agreement. While the officious bystander test is not the overriding formulation in English law today, it provides a useful guide. The suggested approach is to imagine a nosey, officious bystander walking past two contracting parties and asking them whether they would want to put some express term into the agreement. If the parties would instantly retort that such a term is "of course" already mutually part of the agreement then it is apt for implication.

== Overview ==
In Southern Foundries (1926) Ltd v Shirlaw MacKinnon LJ wrote,

For my part, I think that there is a test that may be at least as useful as such generalities. If I may quote from an essay which I wrote some years ago, I then said: "Prima facie that which in any contract is left to be implied and need not be expressed is something so obvious that it goes without saying; so that, if, while the parties were making their bargain, an officious bystander were to suggest some express provision for it in their agreement, they would testily suppress him with a common 'Oh, of course!'"

At least it is true, I think, that, if a term were never implied by a judge unless it could pass that test, he could not be held to be wrong.

The test is outdated to the extent that it suggested implication was a process dependent on what contracting parties would have subjectively intended. The main problem is that people would often disagree, or one side's bargaining power would be such that they could ignore the intentions of the other party. The rule now is that terms are implied to reflect the parties' reasonable expectations as a broader part of the process of objective, contextual construction. In AG of Belize v Belize Telecom Ltd, Lord Hoffmann wrote the following:

23. The danger lies, however, in detaching the phrase "necessary to give business efficacy" from the basic process of construction of the instrument. It is frequently the case that a contract may work perfectly well in the sense that both parties can perform their express obligations, but the consequences would contradict what a reasonable person would understand the contract to mean. Lord Steyn made this point in the Equitable Life case (at p 459) when he said that in that case an implication was necessary "to give effect to the reasonable expectations of the parties."

25. Likewise, the requirement that the implied term must "go without saying" is no more than another way of saying that, although the instrument does not expressly say so, that is what a reasonable person would understand it to mean. Any attempt to make more of this requirement runs the risk of diverting attention from the objectivity which informs the whole process of construction into speculation about what the actual parties to the contract or authors (or supposed authors) of the instrument would have thought about the proposed implication. The imaginary conversation with an officious bystander in Shirlaw v Southern Foundries (1926) Ltd [1939] 2 KB 206, 227 is celebrated throughout the common law world. Like the phrase "necessary to give business efficacy", it vividly emphasises the need for the court to be satisfied that the proposed implication spells out what the contract would reasonably be understood to mean. But it carries the danger of barren argument over how the actual parties would have reacted to the proposed amendment. That, in the Board's opinion, is irrelevant. Likewise, it is not necessary that the need for the implied term should be obvious in the sense of being immediately apparent, even upon a superficial consideration of the terms of the contract and the relevant background. The need for an implied term not infrequently arises when the draftsman of a complicated instrument has omitted to make express provision for some event because he has not fully thought through the contingencies which might arise, even though it is obvious after a careful consideration of the express terms and the background that only one answer would be consistent with the rest of the instrument. In such circumstances, the fact that the actual parties might have said to the officious bystander "Could you please explain that again?" does not matter.

M&S v BNP Paribas (2015) confirmed that the officious bystander test remained one of necessity, not reasonableness.

== See also ==
- English contract law
- UK company law
