= Honor Earl =

British artist, portrait painter and philanthropist

- Born: Edith Honor Betty Maugham; 24 March 1901; Kensington, London, England
- Died: 2 February 1996 (aged 94)
- Occupations: Artist, portrait painter, philanthropist
- Organization(s): The Young Musicians' Fund (founder and chair)
- Spouse: Sebastian Earl
- Father: Frederic Maugham, 1st Viscount Maugham
- Relatives: Robin Maugham (brother); W. Somerset Maugham (uncle)

Honor Earl (née Maugham; 24 March 1901–2 February 1996) was a British artist, portrait painter, and philanthropist, who founded the Young Musicians’ Fund to enable talented youth without means to receive musical tuition.

== Life ==
Edith Honor Betty Maugham was born in Kensington, London, the second daughter of Frederic Maugham, 1st Viscount Maugham, Lord Chancellor under Neville Chamberlain and brother of writer W. Somerset Maugham. Her father was described as "a chilly, distant figure uninterested in his offspring and fiercely devoted to his work." She had a brother and two sisters. Her brother Robin went on to dedicate his book about homosexuality, The Wrong People, to Honor, viewing her as the most liberal member of his family.

Earl had natural artistic talent, which she called her ability "to do certain tricks". This helped her overcome the effects of dyslexia, and to support charities through the sale of her work. She married Sebastian Earl. The couple had two sons.

Described as "an eccentric personality", Earl created pastel portraits of some of the era's most famous figures, including Sir John Gielgud, Laurence Olivier, Dirk Bogarde, Sir John Clements, Dame Flora Robson, Robert Flemyng, Beverley Nichols, Sir Ralph Richardson and Dame Vera Lynn. She was made godmother to the daughter of actress Anna Lee and director Robert Stevenson. She was also a favoured artist of the royal family, painting the Queen Mother, as well as the Prince and Princess of Wales.

The Times wrote of Earl that, despite her comfort within high society:

it was in the portraiture of children — an area from which most artists shy — that Honor Earl specialised. Again she chose her sitters from across the widest spectrum of society, her subjects ranging from Peter Phillips, the Queen’s first grandchild, to Christopher, a severely crippled Barnardo orphan. She had a great empathy with children and knew how to keep them alert while they sat. Often she would sketch with one hand while playing with glove puppets in the other or making tunes with a comb and piece of paper.

Earl also devoted significant time to charities and the under-privileged. From 1937, she was a prison visitor, saying: "I have seen so many tragic people whose misery could have been avoided by the right treatment". During the Second World War she created portraits of members of the armed forces and donated the proceeds to the Red Cross. She was a reserve A.R.P. transport driver, secretary of a care committee for schoolchildren, and a night duty volunteer for a mobile canteen at London railway stations. Earl also fundraised for the All-Nations Voluntary Service League, and donated the proceeds from her artwork to a range of societies including the National Council for the Unmarried Mother and Child, the Actors’ Orphanage, and The National Society for Prevention of Cruelty to Children. She founded and chaired the Young Musicians’ Fund, supporting young people with musical talent whose parents could not afford musical tuition.

During the Second World War, Earl was commissioned to create portraits of service men and women (known as "Empire servicemen") from what were then British dominions and colonies. These were exhibited at the Royal Empire Society in December 1945 in an exhibition titled 'Warriors of the Empire'. Another of Earl's series was of North American people, exhibited as 'Who are the Americans?'

Earl continued to work into old age, but said she "looked forward like anything to dying”. She retained a fascination with the spirit world, and was a lifelong member of the College of Psychic Studies. Honor Earl died on 2 February 1996, aged 94. A memorial service was held at St. Luke's Church, at which Earl's grandson read Tennyson's poem Crossing the Bar.
