= Re Curtain Dream plc =

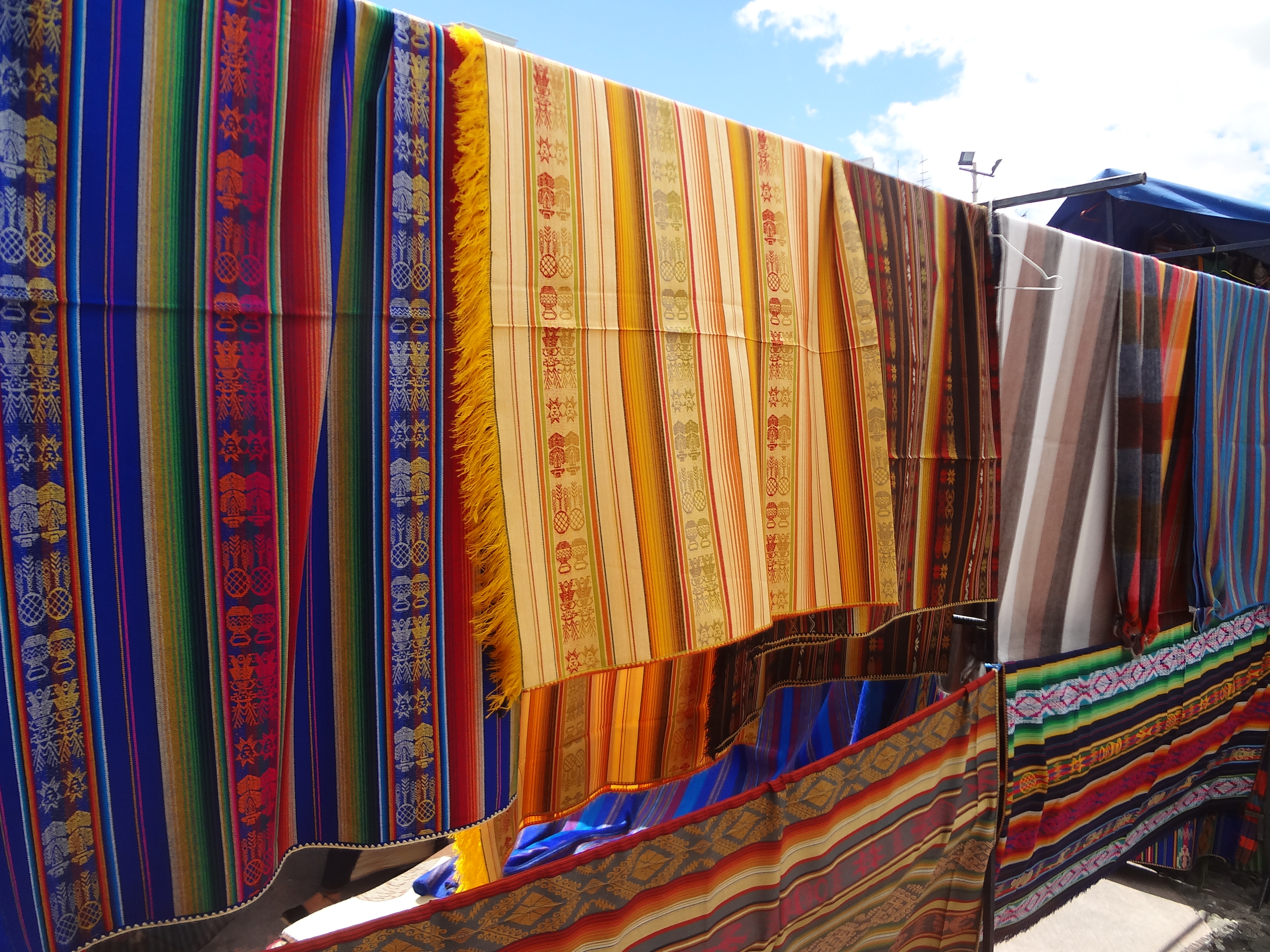
- Court: High Court
- Full case name: Re Curtain Dream plc
- Decided: 9 March 1990
- Citation: [1990] BCLC 925

Court membership
- Judge sitting: Knox J

Keywords
- recharacterisation; mortgage; retention of title

Re Curtain Dream plc [1990] BCLC 925 is a judicial decision of the English courts in relation to recharacterisation. It held that where a transaction was documented in a certain way to mask the true nature of the transaction, the court could disregard the mask and construe the transaction as it was intended to be in truth. The court held that properly construed the transaction in question was a mortgage which was void against a liquidator for non-registration.

== Facts ==
Curtain Dream plc was a fabric company. It was indebted to Barclays Bank who had taken security over all of the company's assets. Subsequently, the company entered into a financing arrangement with Churchill Merchanting Ltd. Under that arrangement the company would sell all of its stock in trade to Churchill. Churchill would then sell that stock back to the company on retention of title terms, such that the stock remained the property of Churchill until the company sold it to a third party. The company would then use the proceeds of sale to pay Churchill the original purchase price plus accrued interest. The fabric itself remained at all times in the company's warehouse and never moved.

The company failed and Barclays appointed receivers. The receivers then brought an application challenging the financing arrangements with Churchill, alleging that in reality it amounted to a mortgage, and that the mortgage was not enforceable because it had not been registered as required by section 395 of the Companies Act 1985.

== Decision ==
The case came before Knox J.

He reviewed the relevant authorities on financing transactions and mortgages, including the judgment of Lord Hanworth MR in Re George Inglefield Ltd [1933] Ch 1, particularly his comment that: "It is old law, and plain law, that in transactions of this sort the Court must consider whether or not the documents really mask the true transaction. If they do merely mask the transaction, the Court must have regard to the true position, in substance and in fact, and for this purpose tear away the mask or cloak that has been put upon the real transaction." He also reviewed Manchester Sheffield and Lincolnshire Railway Co v North Central Wagon Co (1888) 13 App Cas 554.

Ultimately he decided that in truth the transaction was a financing arrangement. Churchill were not traders in fabric and had never taken possession of it. The terms of the agreements made it clear that funds were being advanced on credit and were subject to interest at commercial rates. The transfer and re-transfer of title to the fabric was, in truth, a mortgage and was unenforceable for non-registration.

== Appeal ==
An appeal was lodged against the decision, but was abandoned before the hearing date.
