= Seymour Karminski =

British judge (1902–1974)

Sir Seymour Edward Karminski (28 September 1902 – 29 October 1974) was a British judge.

The son of a German-born bank manager. Karminski was educated at Rugby School and Christ Church, Oxford, where he took a First in History in 1923. He was called to the bar by the Inner Temple in 1925, and took silk in 1945. During World War II, he joined the Royal Naval Volunteer Reserve in 1940, where he reached the rank of lieutenant commander.

In 1951, he was appointed to the High Court and assigned to the Probate, Divorce and Admiralty Division, and received the customary knighthood. At the time, he was one of the two Jewish judges on the High Court bench, the other being Sir Lionel Cohen. In 1967, Karminski was sworn in the Privy Council. He was made a Lord Justice of Appeal in 1969, and served until 1973.

Karminski was elected Bencher of the Inner Temple in 1951, Reader in 1971, and Treasurer in 1973.
