= Littlewoods Mail Order Stores Ltd v IRC =

UK company law case

Littlewoods Mail Order Stores v IRC
- Court: Court of Appeal of England and Wales
- Citation: [1969] 1 WLR 1241

Court membership
- Judges sitting: Lord Denning MR, Sachs LJ and Karminski LJ

Keywords
- Piercing the corporate veil

Littlewoods Mail Order Stores v Inland Revenue Commissioners [1969] 1 WLR 1241 is a UK company law case concerning piercing the corporate veil.

== Facts ==
The facts were summarised by Lord Denning MR, in his judgment.

Littlewoods had a store in Jubilee House, Oxford Street. Its premises were on a 99-year lease for £23,444 a year from a charity called Oddfellows Friendly Society. ‘During the next 11 years the value of money got much less. In 1958 the building was worth about £2,000,000 if sold with vacant possession. And the rent obtainable on a tenancy from year to year granted in 1958 would be £60,000 a year. Yet Littlewoods had a lease with another 88 years to go at a rent of £23,444… in 1958 the advisers of Oddfellows and Littlewoods carried through a deal which was designed to confer a considerable advantage on both of them. It came to this: the Oddfellows transferred the freehold in Jubilee House to the Fork Manufacturing Co. Ltd., which was a wholly owned subsidiary of Littlewoods. The Fork Company let Jubilee House to the Oddfellows for 22 years and 10 days at a rent of £6 a year. The Oddfellows granted an underlease to Littlewoods for 22 years at a rent of £42,450 a year. The result was that Littlewoods gave up their lease for 88 years at a rent of £23,444 and took instead a lease from the Oddfellows for 22 years at £42,450: and, in addition, Littlewoods, through their wholly owned subsidiary, the Fork Manufacturing Co. Ltd., at the end of the 22 years, would have the entire freehold in hand in possession. In return the Oddfellows received a rent of £42,450 for 22 years and then lost all interest in the premises. The deal was designed to advantage both in this way: on the one hand Oddfellows would receive a rent of £42,450 a year for 22 years, which would be clear of tax as they were a charity. On the other hand, Littlewoods would claim to deduct the full rent of £42,450 from their profits instead of the smaller sum of £23,444. So they would escape a lot of tax. The deal would be to the advantage of both sides, at the expense of the revenue.

Littlewoods was complaining that the whole rent of £42,450 was deductible as an expense wholly for the purpose of trade under s 137 Income Tax Act 1952. The Commissioners rejected this. Plowman J held that the rent payments by Littlewoods were of a revenue character and properly deductible, but relying on a case that was soon reversed by the House of Lords.

== Judgment ==
Sachs LJ and Karminski LJ held that FM’s interposition made no difference to the real nature of the payments, the transfers were not ‘money wholly and exclusively laid out’ for the purpose of trade and not deductible. For the purpose of annual expenditure the courts must look to the true nature of the transaction. Lord Denning MR held more broadly that the wholly owned subsidiary was not in this case a separate legal entity.

The doctrine laid down in Salomon v Salomon has to be watched very carefully. It has often been supposed to cast a veil over the personality of a limited company through which the courts cannot see. But that is not true. The courts can and often do draw aside the veil. They can, and often do, pull off the mask. They look to see what really lies behind. The legislature has shown the way with group accounts and the rest. And the courts should follow suit. I think that we should look at the Fork Manufacturing Co. Ltd. and see it as it really is — the wholly owned subsidiary of Littlewoods. It is the creature, the puppet, of Littlewoods, in point of fact: and it should be so regarded in point of law. The basic fact here is that Littlewoods, through their wholly owned subsidiary, have acquired a capital asset — the freehold of Jubilee House: and they have acquired it by paying an extra £19,006 a year. So regarded, the case is indistinguishable from the Land Securities case. Littlewoods are not entitled to deduct this extra £19,006 in computing their profits.

== See also ==
- UK company law
