= Linwood v Andrews (1888) =

British court case

Linwood v Andrews (1888) is a landmark case in English Law and a Common law precedent regarding making misleading submissions to a court.

The case related to the lawyer submitting to the court a false affidavit. with the intent to deceive a court. Charles Moore was a junior Barrister in the matter between Linwood and Andrews. The court found that [he] had allowed his leader to read affidavits which he knew were untrue, and that Miss Andrews had consequently lost property of considerable value.

The lawyer was convicted of contempt of court, and ultimately sent to prison.
