= Maughan (surname) =

Maughan is a surname. Notable people with the surname include:

- Ariel Maughan (1923–1997), American professional basketball player
- Arthur Maughan, American wrestler
- Bridget Atkinson (née Maughan) (1732–1814) English farmer and shell collector who amassed a collection from around the world. First honorary member of the Society of Antiquaries of Newcastle upon Tyne.
- Clyde Maughan (1926–2026), American engineer
- Cynthia Maughan (born 1949), American video artist
- Deryck Maughan (born 1947), British businessman and philanthropist
- George Maughan (1910–2003), Canadian boxer who competed in the 1932 Summer Olympics
- James Maughan (1826–1871), Methodist minister in Adelaide, South Australia, father of Milton Moss Maughan
- John Maughan Barnett (1867–1938), New Zealand organist, choirmaster, pianist, composer and conductor
- Margaret Maughan (1928–2020), British Paralympic archer
- Milton Moss Maughan (1856–1921), South Australian educationalist, son of James Maughan
- Monica Maughan (1933–2010), Australian actor with roles in film, theatre, radio and television
- Noel Maughan, Australian politician, Nationals member for Rodney in the Victorian Legislative Assembly 1989–2006
- Peter Maughan (1811–1871), early Mormon pioneer who settled the Cache Valley of Utah under the direction of Brigham Young
- Rex Maughan, the founder, president, and CEO of Forever Living Products and Terry Labs
- Russell Maughan, pioneer aviator and U.S. military pilot
- Sharon Maughan (born 1950), British actress
- Susan Maughan (born 1938), English singer who released successful singles in the 1960s
- William Maughan (footballer) (1894–1916), English footballer
- William Ryott Maughan (1863–1933), English-born Australian politician
