= Viscount Maugham =

Defunct title of the peerage of the United Kingdom

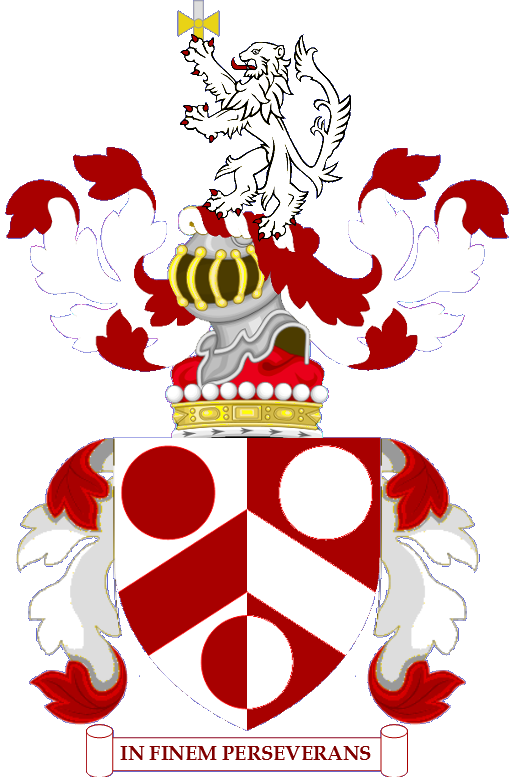
Lord Maugham's achievement of arms, depicted at Lincoln's Inn and the Palace of Westminster

Viscount Maugham, of Hartfield in the County of Sussex, was a title in the Peerage of the United Kingdom. It was created on 22 September 1939 for the former Lord Chancellor, Frederic Maugham, Baron Maugham. He had already been created a life peer under the Appellate Jurisdiction Act 1876 as Baron Maugham, of Hartfield in the County of Sussex, on 7 October 1935. This title was also in the Peerage of the United Kingdom. On Lord Maugham's death in 1958 the life barony became extinct while he was succeeded in the viscountcy by his only son, the second Viscount. He was an author known as Robin Maugham. He never married and on his death in 1981 the viscountcy became extinct.

Viscount Maugham was the author of 'U.N.O and War Crimes' published by John Murray, 1951.

The author W. Somerset Maugham was the younger brother of the first Viscount.

== Viscounts Maugham (1939) ==
- Frederic Herbert Maugham, 1st Viscount Maugham (1866–1958)
- Robert Cecil Romer "Robin" Maugham, 2nd Viscount Maugham (1916–1981)
