= Frederic Maugham, 1st Viscount Maugham =

British barrister and judge

The Right Honourable The Viscount Maugham PC
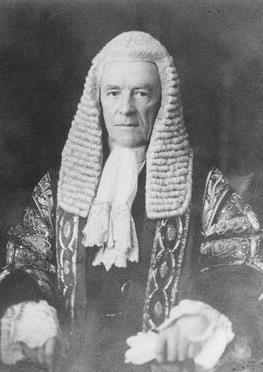

Lord Chancellor
- In office 9 March 1938 – 3 September 1939
- Monarch: George VI
- Prime Minister: Neville Chamberlain
- Preceded by: The Viscount Hailsham
- Succeeded by: The Viscount Caldecote

Member of the House of Lords Lord Temporal
- In office 7 October 1935 – 23 March 1958; Hereditary Peerage
- Preceded by: Peerage created
- Succeeded by: The 2nd Viscount Maugham

Personal details
- Born: 20 October 1866 Paris, France
- Died: 23 March 1958 (aged 91)
- Party: Conservative
- Spouse: Helen Romer (m. 1896; died 1950)
- Education: Trinity Hall, Cambridge

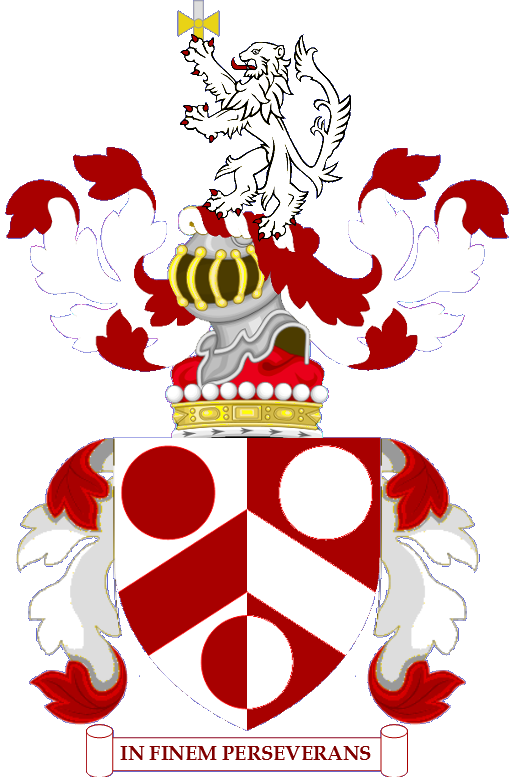
Lord Maugham's achievement of arms, depicted at Lincoln's Inn and the Palace of Westminster

Frederic Herbert Maugham, 1st Viscount Maugham, PC (20 October 1866 – 23 March 1958) was a British barrister and judge who was Lord Chancellor from March 1938 until September 1939.

== Background and education ==
Born in Paris, Maugham was the second son of Robert Ormond Maugham, a solicitor, by his wife, Edith, daughter of Major Charles Snell. The author W. Somerset Maugham was his younger brother. His grandfather, Robert Maugham, was one of the founders of the Law Society. He was educated at Dover College and at Trinity Hall, Cambridge. He rowed for the winning Cambridge crew in the 1888 Boat Race and was also in the winning Trinity Hall Boat Club coxless four which won the Stewards' Challenge Cup at Henley Royal Regatta that year. He was in the winning Cambridge crew in the Boat Race again in 1889. He also became President of the Cambridge Union Society in Lent Term 1889.

== Political and legal career ==
Lord Maugham painted in 1939 by Reginald Grenville Eves

Maugham was called to the bar by Lincoln's Inn in 1890, and embarked upon a legal career, becoming a King's Counsel in 1913. In 1922, he briefly considered entering politics as a Conservative Member of Parliament but could not find a seat. He was a Judge of the High Court of Justice (Chancery Division) from 1928 to 1934 and a Lord Justice of Appeal from 1934 to 1935. He was knighted in 1928 and sworn of the Privy Council in 1934. The following year he became a Lord of Appeal in Ordinary, was created a life peer on 7 October 1935 and entered the House of Lords as Baron Maugham, of Hartfield in the County of Sussex. Three years later he was offered the position of Lord Chancellor by Prime Minister Neville Chamberlain. Such was Maugham's lack of political experience that Chamberlain and he had never met before. He was offered the role because there were very few obvious available choices amongst the ranks of parliamentary supporters of the National Government to replace the ailing Lord Hailsham—for the obvious successor, Sir Thomas Inskip, could not be moved from the position of Minister for Coordination of Defence.

As Maugham was already 71 years old it was widely expected that he would prove to be a mere stop-gap appointment, to be succeeded by Inskip as soon as it was possible for the latter to leave Defence. However, by the time this occurred in early 1939, Chamberlain was sufficiently impressed with Maugham's work to offer to retain him, whilst allowing Inskip the opportunity to defer choosing between becoming Lord Chancellor or remaining in the House of Commons with the possibility of becoming prime minister, a choice that Hailsham had always regretted. Chamberlain intended to make a change at the next general election, which was expected to take place that year.

However, war intervened and Chamberlain carried out a full-scale reconstruction of his government. As part of this Maugham was allowed to retire, to be finally succeeded by Inskip, who was ennobled as Viscount Caldecote. Maugham took the retirement honour, of being created Viscount Maugham, of Hartfield in the County of Sussex on 22 September 1939, which, unlike his barony, was hereditary. He again served as a Lord of Appeal in Ordinary until 1941.

== Family ==
Maugham married Helen Mary, daughter of Sir Robert Romer, in 1896.

They had four children:

- The Hon. Kate Mary Maugham (1897–1961)
- The Hon. Edith Honor Maugham (1901–1996, married Sebastian Earl)
- The Hon. Diana Julia Maugham (1908–2007)
- Robert Cecil Romer Maugham (1916–1981), 2nd Viscount. Known as Robin Maugham. He wrote about his father in two volumes of autobiography, Escape from the Shadows (1970) and Search for Nirvana (1977).

Lady Maugham died in October 1950, aged 78. Lord Maugham survived her by seven years, dying in March 1958, aged 91. He is buried in the grounds of the parish church in Hartfield, East Sussex, alongside his wife and son.

== Publications ==
- The Case of Jean Calas published by W. Heinemann (1928)
- The Perfect Crime (short story, as Ormond Greville) published in Pearson's Magazine (1932)
- The Tichbourne Case (1936)
- Lies As Allies or Hitler at War published by Oxford University Press (1941)
- The Truth About The Munich Crisis (1944)
- U.N.O. and War Crimes (1951)
- At The End of The Day (autobiography) (1951)

== See also ==
- List of Cambridge University Boat Race crews

Political offices
Preceded by The Viscount Hailsham	Lord High Chancellor of Great Britain; 1938–1939	Succeeded by The Viscount Caldecote
Peerage of the United Kingdom
New creation	Viscount Maugham; 1939–1958	Succeeded by Robert Cecil Romer Maugham
