= Foss v Harbottle =

Case in English corporate law

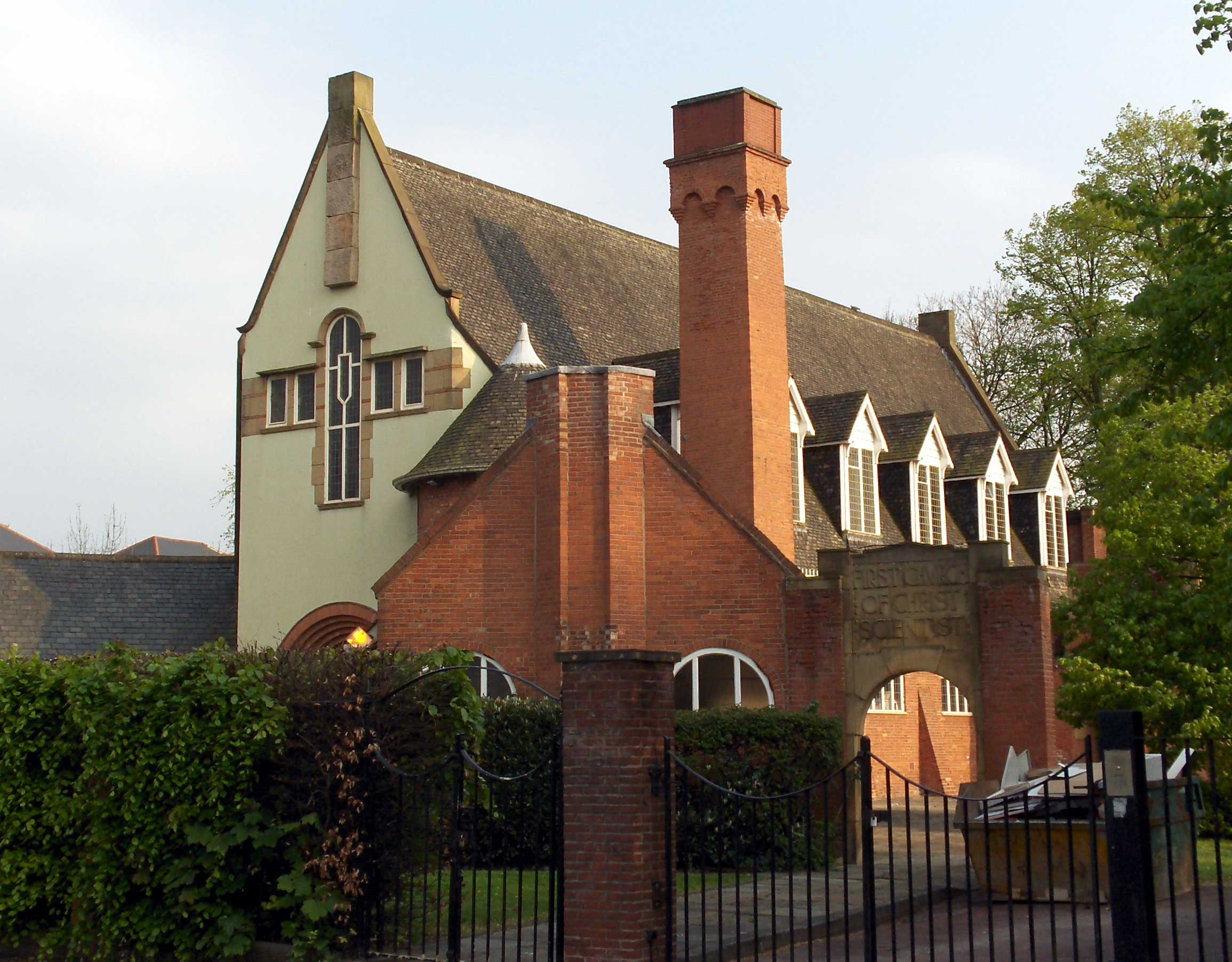
- Edgar Wood building, Victoria Park, Manchester
- Court: Court of Chancery
- Citations: (1843) 67 ER 189, (1843) 2 Hare 461

Case opinions
- Wigram VC

Keywords
- Derivative action, separate legal personality

Foss v Harbottle (1843) 2 Hare 461, 67 ER 189 is a leading English precedent in corporate law. In any action in which a wrong is alleged to have been done to a company, the proper claimant is the company itself. This is known as "the proper plaintiff rule", and the several important exceptions that have been developed are often described as "exceptions to the rule in Foss v Harbottle". Among these is the "derivative action", which allows a minority shareholder to bring a claim on behalf of the company. This applies in situations of "wrongdoer control" and is, in reality, the only true exception to the rule. The rule in Foss v Harbottle is best seen as the starting point for minority shareholder remedies.

The rule has now largely been partly codified and displaced in the United Kingdom by the Companies Act 2006 sections 260–263, setting out a statutory derivative claim.

== Facts ==
Richard Foss and Edward Starkie Turton were two minority shareholders in the "Victoria Park Company". The company had been set up in September 1835 to buy 180 acres (0.73 km^{2}) of land near Manchester and, according to the report,

enclosing and planting the same in an ornamental and park-like manner, and erecting houses thereon with attached gardens and pleasure-grounds, and selling, letting or otherwise disposing thereof.

This became Victoria Park. Subsequently, an Act of Parliament incorporated the company. The claimants alleged that the company's property had been misapplied and wasted, and that various mortgages had been improperly granted over the company's land. They asked that the guilty parties be held accountable to the company and that a receiver be appointed.

The defendants were the five company directors (Thomas Harbottle, Joseph Adshead, Henry Byrom, John Westhead, and Richard Bealey), the solicitors and architect (Joseph Denison, Thomas Bunting, and Richard Lane), and also H. Rotton, E. Lloyd, T. Peet, J. Biggs and S. Brooks, the several assignees of Byrom, Adshead, and Westhead, who had become bankrupt.

== Judgment ==
Wigram VC dismissed the claim and held that when a company is wronged by its directors, it is only the company that has standing to sue. In effect, the court established two rules. First, the "proper plaintiff rule" provides that a wrong done to the company may be vindicated by the company alone. Second, the "majority rule principle" states that if the alleged wrong can be confirmed or ratified by a simple majority of members in a general meeting, the court will not interfere (legal term).

The Victoria Park Company is an incorporated body, and the conduct with which the defendants are charged in this suit is an injury not to the plaintiffs exclusively; it is an injury to the whole corporation by individuals whom the corporation entrusted with powers to be exercised only for the good of the corporation. And from the case of Attorney-General v Wilson (1840) Cr & Ph 1 (without going further) it may be stated as undoubted law that a bill or information by a corporation will lie to be relieved in respect of injuries which the corporation has suffered at the hands of persons standing in the situation of the directors upon this record. This bill, however, differs from that in Attorney-General v Wilson in this – that, instead of the corporation being formally represented as plaintiffs, the bill in this case is brought by two individual corporators, professedly on behalf of themselves and all the other members of the corporation, except those who committed the injuries complained of—the plaintiffs assuming to themselves the right and power in that manner to sue on behalf of and represent the corporation itself.

It was not, nor could it successfully be, argued that it was a matter of course for any individual members of a corporation thus to assume to themselves the right of suing in the name of the corporation. In law the corporation and the aggregate members of the corporation are not the same thing for purposes like this; and the only question can be whether the facts alleged in this case justify a departure from the rule which, primâ facie, would require that the corporation should sue in its own name and in its corporate character, or in the name of someone whom the law has appointed to be its representative...

The first objection taken in the argument for the defendants was that the individual members of the corporation cannot in any case sue in the form in which this bill is framed. During the argument I intimated an opinion, to which, upon further consideration, I fully adhere, that the rule was much too broadly stated on the part of the defendants. I think there are cases in which a suit might properly be so framed. Corporations like this, of a private nature, are in truth little more than private partnerships; and in cases which may easily be suggested it would be too much to hold that a society of private persons associated together in undertakings, which, though certainly beneficial to the public, are nevertheless matters of private property, are to be deprived of their civil rights, inter se, because, in order to make their common objects more attainable, the Crown or the legislature may have conferred upon them the benefit of a corporate character. If a case should arise of injury to a corporation by some of its members, for which no adequate remedy remained, except that of a suit by individual corporators in their private characters, and asking in such character the protection of those rights to which in their corporate character they were entitled, I cannot but think that the principle so forcibly laid down by Lord Cottenham in Wallworth v Holt (4 Myl & Cr 635; see also 17 Ves 320, per Lord Eldon) and other cases would apply, and the claims of justice would be found superior to any difficulties arising out of technical rules respecting the mode in which corporations are required to sue.

But, on the other hand, it must not be without reasons of a very urgent character that established rules of law and practice are to be departed from, rules which, though in a sense technical, are founded on general principles of justice and convenience; and the question is whether a case is stated in this bill entitling the plaintiffs to sue in their private characters...

Now, that my opinion upon this case may be clearly understood, I will consider separately the two principal grounds of complaint to which I have adverted, with reference to a very marked distinction between them. The first ground of complaint is one which, though it might primâ facie entitle the corporation to rescind the transactions complained of, does not absolutely and of necessity fall under the description of a void transaction. The corporation might elect to adopt those transactions, and hold the directors bound by them. In other words, the transactions admit of confirmation at the option of the corporation. The second ground of complaint may stand in a different position; I allude to the mortgaging in a manner not authorized by the powers of the Act. This, being beyond the powers of the corporation, may admit of no confirmation whilst any one dissenting voice is raised against it. This distinction is found in the case of Preston v The Grand Collier Dock Company (1840) 11 Sim 327, SC; 2 Railway Cases 335.

On the first point it is only necessary to refer to the clauses of the Act to shew that, whilst the supreme governing body, the proprietors at a special general meeting assembled, retain the power of exercising the functions conferred upon them by the Act of Incorporation, it cannot be competent to individual corporators to sue in the manner proposed by the plaintiffs on the present record. This in effect purports to be a suit by cestui que trusts complaining of a fraud committed or alleged to have been committed by persons in a fiduciary character. The complaint is that those trustees have sold lands to themselves, ostensibly for the benefit of the cestui que trusts. The proposition I have advanced is that, although the Act should prove to be voidable, the cestui que trusts may elect to confirm it. Now, who are the cestui que trusts in this case? The corporation, in a sense, is undoubtedly the cestui que trust; but the majority of the proprietors at a special general meeting assembled, independently of any general rules of law upon the subject, by the very terms of the incorporation in the present case, has power to bind the whole body, and every individual corporator must be taken to have come into the corporation upon the terms of being liable to be so bound. How then can this Court act in a suit constituted as this is, if it is to be assumed, for the purposes of the argument, that the powers of the body of the proprietors are still in existence, and may lawfully be exercised for a purpose like that I have suggested? Whilst the Court may be declaring the acts complained of to be void at the suit of the present Plaintiffs, who in fact may be the only proprietors who disapprove of them, the governing body of proprietors may defeat the decree by lawfully resolving upon the confirmation of the very acts which are the subject of the suit. The very fact that the governing body of proprietors assembled at the special general meeting may so bind even a reluctant minority is decisive to shew that the frame of this suit cannot be sustained whilst that body retains its functions...

...

The second point which relates to the charges and incumbrances alleged to have been illegally made on the property of the company is open to the reasoning which I have applied to the first point, upon the question whether, in the present case, individual members are at liberty to complain in the form adopted by this bill; for why should this anomalous form of suit be resorted to, if the powers of the corporation may be called into exercise? But this part of the case is of greater difficulty upon the merits. I follow, with entire assent, the opinion expressed by the Vice-Chancellor in Preston v The Grand Collier Dock Company, that if a transaction be void, and not merely voidable, the corporation cannot confirm it, so as to bind a dissenting minority of its members. But that will not dispose of this question. The case made with regard to these mortgages or incumbrances is, that they were executed in violation of the provisions of the Act. The mortgagees are not defendants to the bill, nor does the bill seek to avoid the security itself, if it could be avoided, on which I give no opinion. The bill prays inquiries with a view to proceedings being taken aliunde to set aside these transactions against the mortgagees. The object of this bill against the defendants is to make them individually and personally responsible to the extent of the injury alleged to have been received by the corporation from the making of the mortgages. Whatever the case might be, if the object of the suit was to rescind these transactions, and the allegations in the bill shewed that justice could not be done to the shareholders without allowing two to sue on behalf of themselves and others, very different considerations arise in a case like the present, in which the consequences only of the alleged illegal Acts are sought to be visited personally upon the directors. The money forming the consideration for the mortgages was received, and was expended in, or partly in, the transactions which are the subject of the first ground of complaint. Upon this, one question appears to me to be, whether the company could confirm the former transactions, take the benefit of the money that has been raised, and yet, as against the directors personally, complain of the acts which they have done, by means whereof the company obtains that benefit which I suppose to have been admitted and adopted by such confirmation. I think it would not be open to the company to do this; and my opinion already expressed on the first point is that the transactions which constitute the first ground of complaint may possibly be beneficial to the company, and may be so regarded by the proprietors, and admit of confirmation. I am of opinion that this question—the question of confirmation or avoidance—cannot properly be litigated upon this record, regard being had to the existing state and powers of the corporation, and that therefore that part of the bill which seeks to visit the directors personally with the consequences of the impeached mortgages and charges, the benefit of which the company enjoys, is in the same predicament as that which relates to the other subjects of complaint. Both questions stand on the same ground, and, for the reasons which I stated in considering the former point, these demurrers must be allowed.

== Developments ==
The rule was later extended to cover cases where the complaint concerns an internal irregularity in the operation of the company. However, the internal irregularity must be capable of being confirmed or sanctioned by the majority.

The rule in Foss v Harbottle has another important implication. A shareholder cannot generally bring a claim to recover reflective loss – a diminution in the value of his or her shares arising from an actionable loss suffered by the company. The proper course is for the company to bring the action and recoup the loss, with the consequence that the value of the shares will be restored.

Because Foss v Harbottle leaves the minority in an unprotected position, exceptions have arisen and statutory provisions have been enacted to provide some protection for minority shareholders. By far the most important protection is the unfair prejudice action in ss. 994–996 of the Companies Act 2006 (UK) (s 232 of the Corporations Act 2001 in Australia). In addition, there is a statutory derivate action available under ss. 260–269 of the 2006 Act (and s 236 of the Corporations Act 2001 in Australia).

== Exceptions to the rule ==
There are certain exceptions to the rule in Foss v Harbottle, where litigation will be allowed. The following exceptions protect basic minority rights, which are necessary to protect regardless of the majority's vote.

1. Ultra vires and illegality

The directors or controlling shareholders of a company may not use their control of the company to commit acts which would be ultra vires or illegal.

- s 39 Companies Act 2006 for the rules on corporate capacity
- Smith v Croft (No 2) and Cockburn v. Newbridge Sanitary Steam Laundry Co. [1915] 1 IR 237, 252–59 (per O'Brien LC and Holmes LJ) for the illegality point

2. Actions requiring a special majority

If some special voting procedure would be necessary under the company's constitution or under the Companies Act, it would defeat both if that could be sidestepped by ordinary resolutions of a simple majority, and no redress for aggrieved minorities to be allowed.

- Edwards v Halliwell [1950] 2 All ER 1064

3. Invasion of individual rights

- Pender v Lushington (1877) 6 Ch D 70, per Jessel MR

...and see again, Edwards v Halliwell [1950] 2 All ER 1064

4. "Frauds on the minority"

- Atwool v Merryweather (1867) LR 5 EQ 464n, per Page Wood VC
- Gambotto v WCP Limited (1995) 182 CLR 432 (Aus)
- Daniels v Daniels (1978)

fraud in the context of derivative action means abuse of power whereby the directors or majority, who are in control of the company, secure a benefit at the expense of the company

...and see Greenhalgh v Arderne Cinemas Ltd for an example of what was not a fraud on the minority.

== See also ==
- UK company law
