= Robin Maugham =

British author (1916–1981)

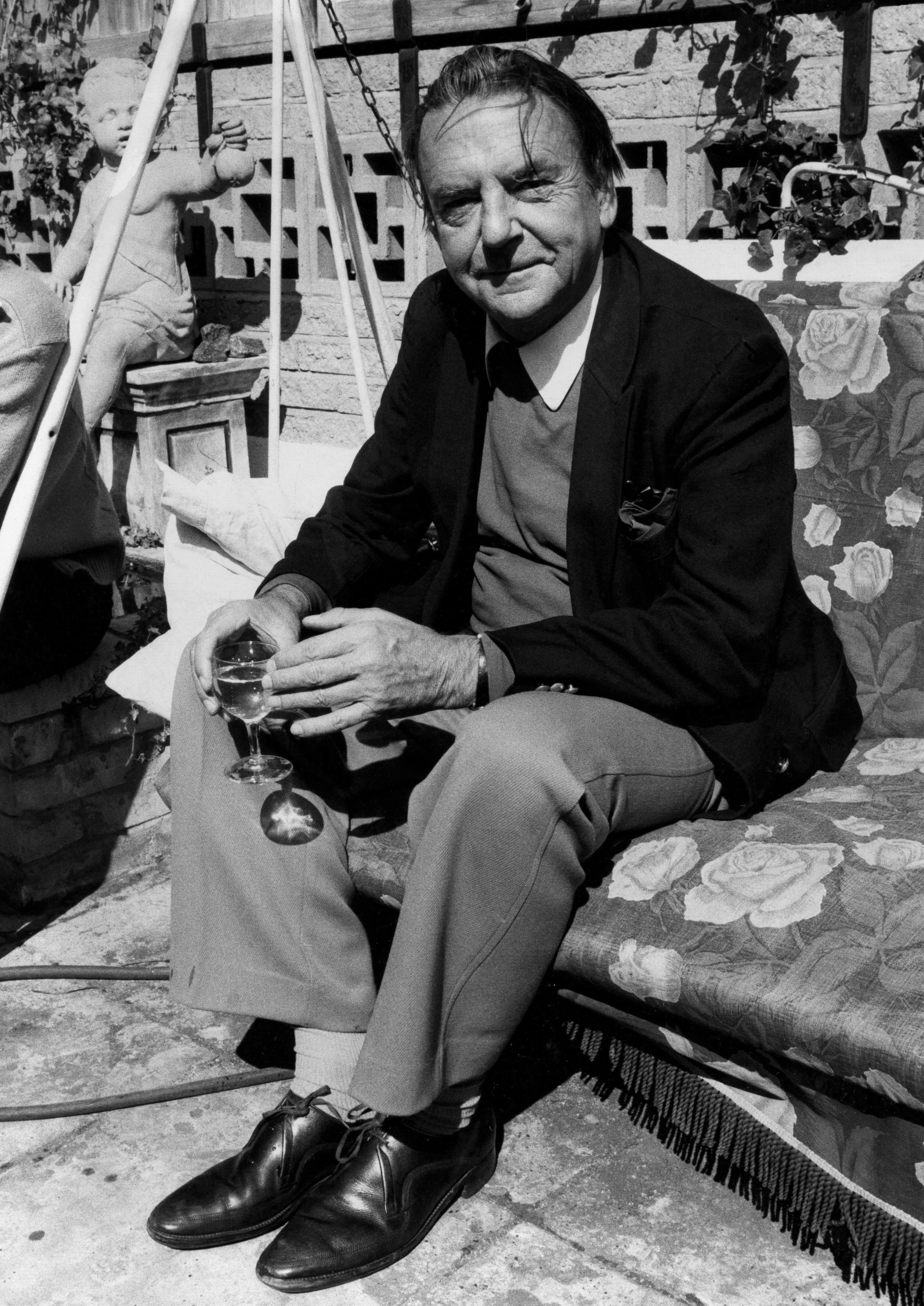
Robin Maugham in 1974, by Allan Warren

Robert Cecil Romer Maugham, 2nd Viscount Maugham (17 May 1916 – 13 March 1981), known as Robin Maugham, was a British author.

Trained as a barrister, he served with distinction in the Second World War, and wrote a successful novella, The Servant, later filmed with Dirk Bogarde and James Fox. This was followed by over thirty books including novels, travelogues, plays and biographical works. In the House of Lords, he drew attention to human trafficking as the new slavery.

== Family background ==
Maugham was the son of Frederic Maugham, 1st Viscount Maugham, and Helen Romer. Educated at Eton College and Trinity Hall, Cambridge, he was expected to follow his father and grandfather into the law. But although he qualified as a barrister, he realised that his real calling was to follow his uncle W. Somerset Maugham as a writer. He also responded against his elite background, turning socialist as a reaction to the spread of fascism in 1930s Europe.

== War service ==
.

When the Second World War looked inevitable, he declined a commission in the Hussars and instead joined up as an ordinary trooper in the 4th County of London Yeomanry tank regiment bound for North Africa. Later, his commanding officer Brigadier Carr recorded in dispatches that Robin Maugham had saved the lives of perhaps 40 men by pulling them from destroyed tanks. At the Battle of Gazala in Libya he sustained a severe head wound that resulted in blackouts, which he later joked made him perfect material for a job in intelligence.

After a period of convalescence he became the unofficial liaison officer between Winston Churchill and both Glubb Pasha and General Paget. He describes in his first travel book Nomad (Chapman & Hall 1947) how he dashed across the Levant from one bemedalled dignitary to another. His maverick style proved an effective driving force behind the setting up of the Middle East Centre for Arab Studies (MECAS), corroborated in Leslie McLoughlin's history of British Arabists in the 20th century In a Sea of Knowledge (Ithaca Press 2002). MECAS had a profound effect on diplomatic relations in the Middle East for decades to come. Frustrated by governmental delays, and in a state of exhaustion, he was invalided back to England.

== Literary career ==
.

Disillusioned by politics, Maugham turned his mind to writing. His first professional dramatic work appeared at the Chanticleer Theatre in South Kensington (1944). This was followed by a novel, Come to Dust (Chapman & Hall 1945), written in a hospital bed as a cathartic release from the traumas of war. His first major success came with the publication of a novella entitled The Servant (Falcon Press 1948), on which was based the classic film The Servant directed by Joseph Losey, starring Dirk Bogarde and James Fox.

After his father died in 1958, he took the title of 2nd Viscount Maugham. His maiden speech in the House of Lords on slavery alerted the world to the continued existence of human trafficking. From this came his book The Slaves of Timbuktu (Longmans 1961). At the height of his career, Maugham was a best-selling author with his novels translated into many languages. He wrote over thirty books including novels, travel books, plays, and biographical works such as Somerset and all the Maughams (Heinemann 1966).

There has been a revival of interest in the works of Robin Maugham with the republication of his novellas The Servant and The Wrong People with introductions by the playwright William Lawrence, a trustee of the 2nd Viscount Maugham's Estate (Deed of Appointment 5 December 2007).

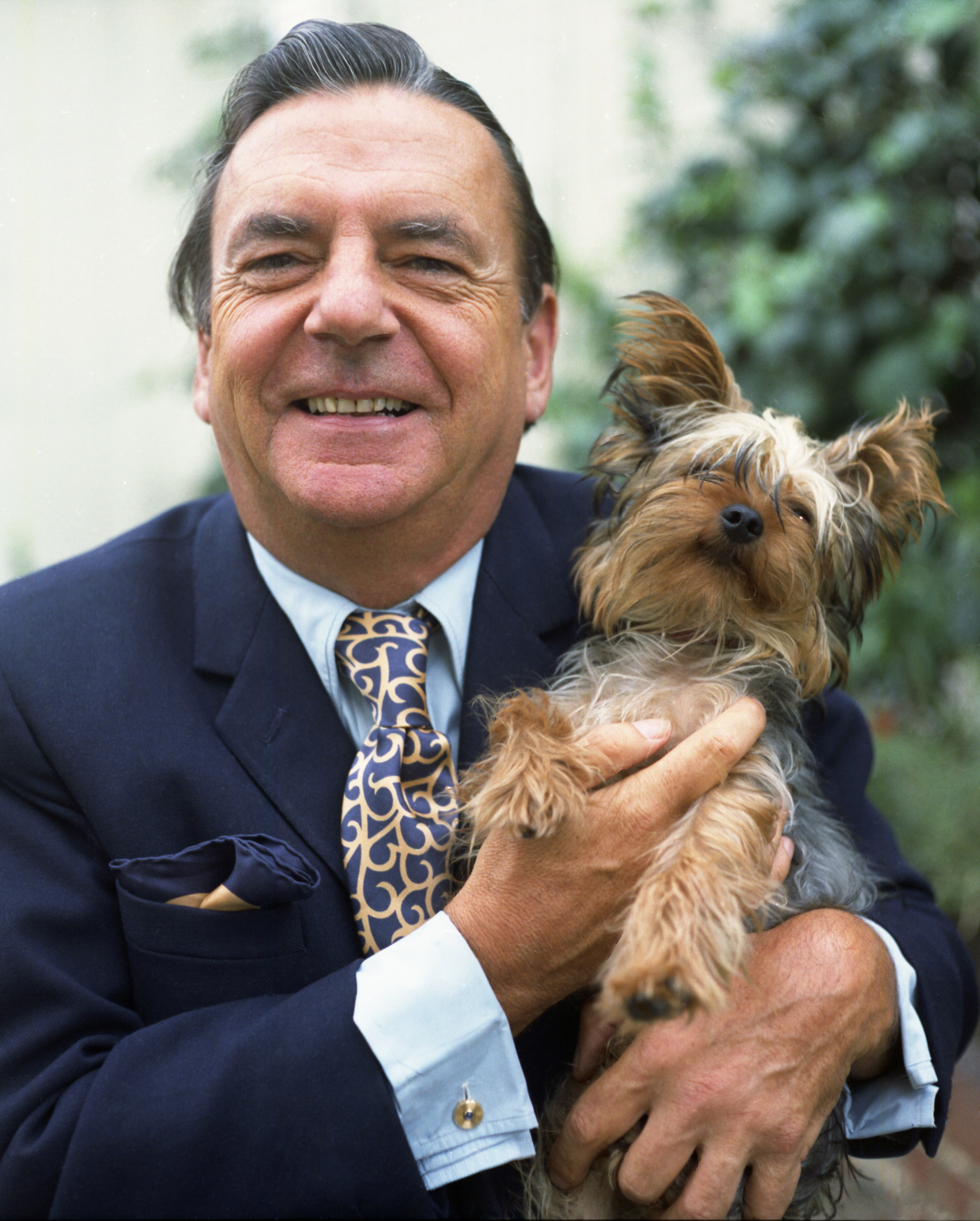
Maugham in 1974

== Personal life ==
Described as "unashamedly homosexual", Maugham never married, and the viscountcy became extinct upon his death. He had three sisters: Kate, Honor, and novelist Diana Marr-Johnson (1908–2007).

Maugham bought the merchant ship MV Joyita as a hulk in the early 1960s, writing about the mystery of the incident in his book The Joyita Mystery (1962). The ship had been lost at sea only to reappear five weeks later after a massive search found nothing, without crew or passengers, and with four tons of cargo missing.

He wrote a candid, critically acclaimed, autobiography, Escape from the Shadows (London: Hodder and Stoughton, 1972), and then a sequel, Search for Nirvana (W. H. Allen London 1975) which he dedicated to his last companion William Lawrence who travelled with him on his search and who assisted him with his work.

== Death ==
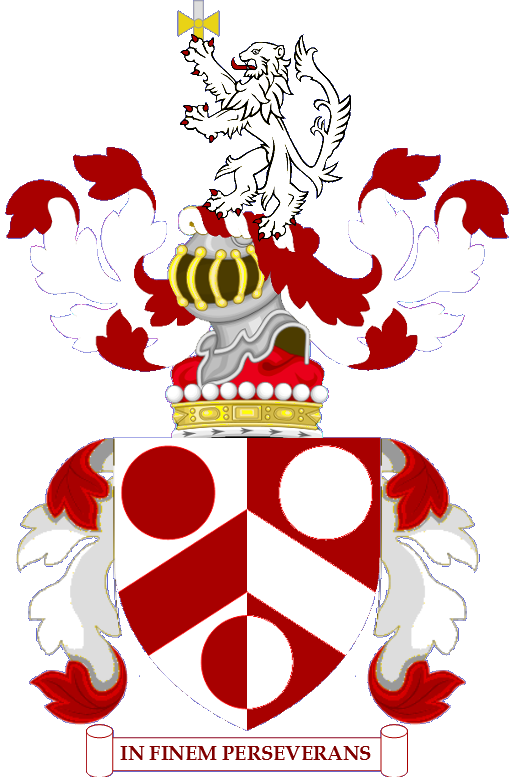
Lord Maugham's achievement of arms, depicted at Lincoln's Inn and the Palace of Westminster

In the last five years of his life, with the impact of the new movement of working class realism, his popularity began to diminish and his health deteriorated. Maugham died in Brighton in 1981, aged 64. He died from a pulmonary embolism, compounded by long-standing diabetes mellitus, although an official cause of death was difficult to obtain as his body was apparently lost for forty-eight hours after his death. He is buried in Hartfield, Sussex, next to his parents.

== Missing diaries ==
.

In November 1991 it was discovered that 24 of the author's chronicles which dated back to the war years, his friendship with Winston Churchill and his time in British Intelligence, had mysteriously disappeared from the home of one of the executors of his estate. The disappearance of Maugham's diaries became the subject of an official investigation by the Chelsea Crime Squad. An article appeared in the Peterborough column of The Daily Telegraph on 22 November 1991 under the heading "Maugham Whodunnit Puzzles Chelsea" – a longer more detailed analysis by the writer and investigative journalist, Michael Thornton, appeared in The Independent on Sunday Review on 22 February 1992, detailing the episode. The diaries were left in trust for the playwright William Lawrence, the author's last partner.

After Maugham's death the subsequent High Court Grant of Probate issued on 23 January 1984 granted William Lawrence as the main beneficiary of the author's works which included a settlement with regard to Maugham's diaries under which the chronicles were kept in trust with the 2nd Viscount's estate.

== Works ==
=== Novels ===
- The Servant (1948)
- Line on Ginger (1949; used for the film The Intruder)
- The Rough and the Smooth (1951)
- Behind the Mirror (1955)
- The Man with Two Shadows (1958)
- November Reef (1962)
- The Green Shade (1966)
- The Wrong People (1967)
- The Second Window (1968)
- The Link: A Victorian Mystery (1969)
- The Last Encounter (1972)
- The Barrier (1973)
- The Sign (1974)
- Knock on Teak (1976)
- Lovers in Exile (1977)
- The Dividing Line (1978)
- The Corridor (1980)
- Refuge (1980, unpublished)
- The Deserters (1981)

=== Collections ===
- The Black Tent and Other Stories (appeared 1972; had been made into a film The Black Tent in 1956)
- The Boy from Beirut and Other Stories, edited by Peter Burton (1982)

=== Biography and travel ===
- Come To Dust (1945)
- Nomad (1947)
- Approach to Palestine (1947)
- North African Notebook (1948)
- Journey to Siwa (1950)
- The Slaves of Timbuktu (1961)
- The Joyita Mystery (1962)
- Somerset and All the Maughams (1966)
- Escape from the Shadows (London: Hodder and Stoughton, 1972): autobiography
- Search for Nirvana (1975): autobiography, continued
- Conversations with Willie (1978)
- Willie (1979)

=== Plays, speeches, television and radio ===
- 1955: The Leopard (play) set in Tanganyika. Connaught Theatre, Worthing
- 1956: Mister Lear (play) Connaught Theatre, Worthing
- 1957: Rise Above It (Television) Produced by ABC. BBC Productions
- 1957: Odd Man In (play) Adaptation of Claude Magnier's comedy Monsieur Masure. St Martin's Theatre
- 1957: The Last Hero (play) Repertory Players, Strand Theatre, London. The subject was the life of General Gordon
- 1957: The Lonesome Road (Play) by Robin Maugham and Philip King. Arts Theatre, London, (1957)
- 1957: Winter in Ischia (Play) (not yet performed), see also 1965
- 1958: The Servant (play) Adaptation by Robin Maugham. Connaught Theatre, Worthing
- 1960: Slavery in Africa and Arabia (The House of Lords publication of his maiden speech; Hansard)
- 1960: The Two Wise Virgins of Hove (ITV Television)
- 1961: The Claimant (play) Connaught Theatre, Worthing
- 1962: Azouk (play) Adaptation of Alexandre Rivermale's play by Robin Maugham and Willis Hall. The Flora Robson Playhouse, Newcastle upon Tyne
- 1962: The Last Hero (radio play) based on the life of General Gordon. Produced for BBC Radio, Saturday Night Theatre
- 1965: Winter in Ischia (television ITV), see also 1957
- 1966: Gordon of Khartoum (Play of the Month, BBC1)
- 1966: The Servant (play) The Yvonne Arnaud Theatre, Guildford
- 1969: Enemy (play) Premiere, The Yvonne Arnaud Theatre Guildford
- 1969: Enemy (play) Saville Theatre, London
- 1981: A Question of Retreat (play) Nightingale Theatre, Brighton; also adapted for a Radio 4, BBC production
- 1989: The Servant (play) Bayview Theatre, Toronto. Starting Keir Dullea and David Ferry.

== Sources ==
- Connon, Bryan (1997) Somerset Maugham and the Maugham Dynasty. London: Sinclair-Stevenson; ISBN 1-85619-274-1
- da Silva, Stephen (12 July 2005). "Maugham, Robin (1916-1981)". glbtq.com. Archived from the original on 21 October 2011.
- Gunn, Drewey Wayne (2014). Gay Novels of Britain, Ireland and the Commonwealth, 1881–1981: A Reader's Guide. Jefferson, NC: McFarland & Company. pp. 143–145.
- Gay for Today, gayfortoday.blogspot.com, May 2007
- Maugham, Robin. Escape from the Shadows, Hodder and Stoughton (1972; reprinted 5 November 1981), ISBN 0860720543/ISBN 978-0860720546
- "Maugham, Robin: An Inventory of His Collection at the Harry Ransom Humanities Research Center". The University of Texas at Austin. Archived from the original on 16 December 2011.
- McLoughlin, Leslie: In a Sea of Knowledge—a history of British Arabists in the 20th century (Ithaca Press 2002)

Peerage of the United Kingdom
Preceded by Frederic Maugham	Viscount Maugham; 1958–1981	Extinct
