= Southern Foundries (1926) Ltd v Shirlaw =

- Court: House of Lords
- Decided: 22 April 1940
- Citation: [1940] AC 701, [1940] 2 All ER 445, 109 LJKB 461, 84 Sol Jo 464, 164 LT 251, 56 TLR 637

Case history
- Prior action: [1939] 2 KB 206

Court membership
- Judges sitting: Viscount Maugham, Lord Atkin, Lord Wright, Lord Romer and Lord Porter

Southern Foundries (1926) Ltd v Shirlaw [1940] AC 701 is an important English contract law and company law case. In the field of contracts it is well known for MacKinnon LJ's decision in the Court of Appeal, where he put forth the "officious bystander" formulation for determining what terms should be implied into agreements by the courts. In the field of company law, it is known primarily to stand for the principle that damages may be sought for breach of contract by a director even though a contract may de facto constrain the exercise of powers to sack people found in the company's constitution.

== Facts ==
Mr Shirlaw had been the managing director of Southern Foundries Ltd, which was in the business of iron castings. But then another company called ‘Federated Foundries Ltd’ took over the business. The new owners had altered article 8 of Southern Foundries Ltd's constitution, empowering two directors and the secretary (who were friends of Federated Foundries) to remove any director. Then they acted on it, by sacking Mr Shirlaw. Mr Shirlaw's contract, signed in 1933 stated that he was to remain in post for ten years.

Mr Shirlaw sued the company for breach of contract, claiming for an injunction to stay in office or substantial damages.

== Judgment ==
Humphreys J in the High Court awarded £12,000 to Mr Shirlaw for breach of contract.

=== Court of Appeal ===
The Court of Appeal held (Sir Wilfrid Greene MR dissenting on this point) that it was an implied term in the 21 December 1933 agreement that the company would not remove Mr Shirlaw from his directorship for the time in which he was appointed as managing director. Furthermore, it was held that it was an implied term that the company would not alter its articles to create a right of removal and there was no case for reducing the damages awarded by the High Court.

At the end of his judgment MacKinnon LJ read out this famous passage.

I recogniSe that the right or duty of a Court to find the existence of an implied term or implied terms in a written contract is a matter to be exercised with care; and a Court is too often invited to do so upon vague and uncertain grounds. Too often also such an invitation is backed by the citation of a sentence or two from the judgment of Bowen LJ in The Moorcock. They are sentences from an extempore judgment as sound and sensible as all the utterances of that great judge; but I fancy that he would have been rather surprised if he could have foreseen that these general remarks of his would come to be a favourite citation of a supposed principle of law, and I even think that he might sympathize with the occasional impatience of his successors when The Moorcock is so often flushed for them in that guise.

For my part, I think that there is a test that may be at least as useful as such generalities. If I may quote from an essay which I wrote some years ago, I then said: "Prima facie that which in any contract is left to be implied and need not be expressed is something so obvious that it goes without saying; so that, if, while the parties were making their bargain, an officious bystander were to suggest some express provision for it in their agreement, they would testily suppress him with a common 'Oh, of course!'"

At least it is true, I think, that, if a term were never implied by a judge unless it could pass that test, he could not be held to be wrong.

Applying that in this case, I ask myself what would have happened if, when this contract had been drafted and was awaiting signature, a third party reading the draft had said:

"Would it not be well to put in a provision that the company shall not exercise or create any right to remove Mr Shirlaw from his directorship, and he have no right to resign his directorship?"

I am satisfied that they would both have assented to this as implied already, and agreed to its expression for greater certainty. Mr. Shirlaw would certainly have said:

"Of course that is implied. If I am to be bound by this agreement, including the barring of my activities under clauses 11 and 12 when I cease to be managing director, obviously the company must not have, or create, the power to remove me at any moment from the Board and so disqualify me from that post"

... and the company, which must be presumed to have been then desirous of binding him to serve them as managing director for ten years, would, I think, with equal alacrity have said:

"Of course that is implied. If you were tempted by some offer elsewhere, it would be monstrous for you to be able to resign your directorship and, by so disqualifying yourself from being managing director, put an end to this agreement."

In the result, I think that the learned judge came to a right decision and this appeal fails.

Goddard LJ concurred with MacKinnon LJ

=== House of Lords ===
Viscount Maugham, Lord Atkin, Lord Wright, Lord Romer and Lord Porter upheld the decision of the Court of Appeal. The House of Lords held it was wrong to act on the change in the articles, that this was a breach of contract, and upheld the £12,000 damages award. Lord Atkin gave a succinct first judgment.

My Lords, the question in this case is whether the appellant company have broken their contract with the respondent made in December, 1933, that he should hold the office of managing director for ten years. The breach alleged is that under the articles adopted by the company, after the agreement, the respondent was removed from the position of director of the company by the Federated Foundries, Ld. There can be no doubt that the office of managing director could only be held by a director, and that upon the holder of the office of managing director ceasing for any cause to be a director the office would be ipso facto vacated. Under the articles in existence at the date of the agreement, by art. 89 the office of a director could be vacated on the happening of six various events, bankruptcy, lunacy, etc., including the giving by the director of one month's notice to resign; while by art. 105 the company by extraordinary resolution could remove him from his office. I feel no doubt that the true construction of the agreement is that the company agreed to employ the respondent and the respondent agreed to serve the company as managing director for the period of ten years. It was by the constitution of the company a condition of holding such office that the holder should continue to be a director: and such continuance depended upon the terms of the articles regulating the office of director. It was not disputed, and I take it to be clear law, that the company's articles so regulating the office of director could be altered from time to time: and therefore the continuance in office of the managing director under the agreement depended upon the provisions of the articles from time to time. Thus the contract of employment for the term of ten years was dependent upon the managing director continuing to be a director. This continuance of the directorship was a concurrent condition. The arrangement between the parties appears to me to be exactly described by the words of Cockburn C.J. in Stirling v Maitland: "If a party enters into an arrangement which can only take effect by the continuance of an existing state of circumstances"; and in such a state of things the Lord Chief Justice said: "I look on the law to be that .... there is an implied engagement on his part that he shall do nothing of his own motion to put an end to that state of circumstances, under which alone the arrangement can be operative." That proposition in my opinion is well established law. Personally I should not so much base the law on an implied term, as on a positive rule of the law of contract that conduct of either promiser or promisee which can be said to amount to himself "of his own motion" bringing about the impossibility of performance is in itself a breach. If A promises to marry B and before performance of that contract marries C, A is not sued for breach of an implied contract not to marry anyone else, but for breach of his contract to marry B. I think it follows that if either the company of its own motion removed the respondent from the office of director under art. 105, or if the respondent caused his office of director to be vacated by giving one month's notice of resignation under art. 89, either of them would have committed a breach of the agreement in question. As Kennedy L.J. said in Measures Bros Ltd v Measures in discussing this very question of the effect upon a contract of employment as managing director of the managing director resigning his office of director: "It is elementary justice that one of the parties to a contract shall not get rid of his responsibilities thereunder by disabling the other contractor from fulfilling his part of the bargain." I cannot agree with the view of the contract taken by the Master of the Rolls that the parties must be taken to have agreed that the term, though expressed to be for ten years, was subject to be determined by any cause, including the will of either party expressed in accordance with the articles; and that such determination therefore could not constitute a breach. I should have construed the agreement as I do on the first two clauses alone, but the remaining clauses and particularly those dealing with the mutual obligations between the respondent and Sir Berkeley Sheffield in this tripartite agreement in my view strongly reinforce that construction. I agree, therefore, with the trial judge, with the majority of the Court of Appeal, and with I believe all your Lordships in thinking that if during the term the respondent had given a notice of resignation, or if the company had exercised its power of removal under art. 105, either would have committed a breach of the contract.

The question that remains is whether if the removal by the company would have been a breach by the company, the removal under the altered articles by the Federated Foundries, Ld., was a breach by the company. In this matter the Master of the Rolls agreed with the other members of the Court of Appeal; but all the members of this House are not agreed.

My Lords, it is obvious that the question is not as simple as in the case just considered of the removal being by the Southern Foundries, Ld.; but I venture respectfully to think that the result must be the same. The office of director involves contractual arrangements between the director and the company. If the company removes the director it puts an end to the contract: and indeed the contract relations cannot be determined unless by events stipulated for in the contract, by operation of law, or by the will of the two parties. The altered art. 8 which gives power to the Federated Foundries, Ld., to remove from office any director of the company is, when analysed, a power to the Federated to terminate a contract between the Southern and its director. It is an act which binds the Southern as against its promisee; and if a wrong to the respondent if done by the Southern it surely must be a wrong to the respondent if done by the Federated who derive their power to do the act from the Southern only. If a landlord gives power to a tenant to discharge the landlord's servants, gardener or gamekeeper; it is the master, the landlord, who is bound by the consequences of that discharge whether rightful, or whether wrongful, and so involving the payment of damages. If a man buys goods and contracts with a sub-purchaser to take delivery direct from his vendor, and contracts with his vendor to give delivery to the sub-purchasers, the latter's recourse for breach of contract to deliver is against his own intermediate seller and not against the head vendor. If then the Federated of their own motion determine the concurrent condition it appears to me that necessarily they cause the Southern to break the contract. I can quite see that the position may be altered where the Federated remove a director from office for such reasons as those contained in the old art. 89 or in art. 72 of Table A, which was not incorporated in the new articles. In such a case it may well be said that the company is not acting of its own motion, but is reasonably moved to act by the acts or omissions of the director. But in the present case no such question arises. The action of the Federated was, I think I may say avowedly, taken for the sole purpose of bringing the managing director's agreement to an end. I do not think that it could be said that the Southern committed any breach by adopting the new articles. But when the Federated acted upon the power conferred upon them in the new articles they bound the Southern if they acted in such a way that action by the Southern on the same articles would be a breach. It is not a question of agency but of acting under powers conferred by contract to interfere with a contract between the party granting the power and a third person. For these reasons I am of opinion that this appeal should be dismissed with costs.

Lord Wright, concurring, stated that it was a breach of contract if a director was removed without cause.

In my opinion the appellant company would beyond question have been guilty of a breach of contract sounding in damages if without just cause they had removed him from his directorship and thus terminated his tenure of office, as was done in March, 1937, in the circumstances which will appear later. The case would have been simply a case of wrongful dismissal of a servant or employee. The servant or employee is in such a case effectively dismissed. His employment is terminated but the termination is wrongful, and the employer has to answer in damages. The employers here are the appellant company, but for this purpose they are like any other employers. The articles may give them the power to dismiss, but the power to dismiss is to be distinguished from the right to dismiss. I do not think that in this particular case the fact that the office includes that of a director, affects this conclusion. It is said that it is impossible to accept that a company would guarantee to a director a ten years' tenure of his office. But the answer is that they have actually done so, according to the terms of the contract, though subject to the express exceptions of the contract and to the general exceptions which the law reads into the contract. The word guarantee is inappropriate. No one, individual or company, can be compelled against his or their will, to employ a man, though, if the contract is broken, damages will have to be paid. When the respondent was appointed managing director for ten years, the contract necessarily meant that the appellant company would not without good cause remove him from his directorship during that period, because if they did so they would ipso facto terminate his employment. There is no question of implying a term that the appellant company would not remove the respondent from his directorship. He could not serve for the agreed term of ten years unless the appellant company continued him in his office. As Lord Blackburn said in Mackay v Dick: "where in a written contract it appears that both parties have agreed that something shall be done" [as here that the respondent shall hold office for ten years] "which cannot effectually be done unless both concur in doing it, the construction of the contract is that each agrees to do all that is necessary to be done on his part for the carrying out of that thing." The agreement involved for its fulfilment the concurrence of the appellants and the respondent and imported that each should do its part in carrying it out.

== See also ==
- UK company law
- Imperial Hydropathic Hotel Co, Blackpool v Hampson (1882) 23 Ch D 1
- Isle of Wight Railway Company v Tahourdin (1884) LR 25 Ch D 320
