= Derivative suit =

Lawsuit brought by a company shareholder

A shareholder derivative suit is a lawsuit brought by a shareholder on behalf of a corporation against a third party. Often, the third party is an insider of the corporation, such as an executive officer or director. Shareholder derivative suits are unique because under traditional corporate law, management is responsible for bringing and defending the corporation against suit. Shareholder derivative suits permit a shareholder to initiate a suit when management has failed to do so. To enable a diversity of management approaches to risks and reinforce the most common forms of corporate rules with a high degree of permissible management power, many jurisdictions have implemented minimum thresholds and grounds (procedural and substantive) to such suits.

== Purpose and difficulties ==
Under traditional corporate business law, shareholders are the owners of a corporation. However, they are not empowered to control the day-to-day operations of the corporation. Instead, shareholders appoint directors, and the directors in turn appoint officers and/or relatively less powerful executives to manage day-to-day operations.

Derivative suits refer to one or more shareholders bringing an action (lawsuit) in the name of the corporation against a party or parties allegedly causing harm to the latter. If the directors, officers, or employees of the corporation are not willing to file an action, a shareholder may first petition them to proceed. If such petition fails, they may take it upon themself to bring an action on behalf of the corporation. Any proceeds (damages and interest in English law) of a successful action are awarded to the corporation and not to the shareholder(s) as the controlling claimant. Empirical research indicates that the threat of derivative litigation serves as a key legal deterrent against managerial misconduct; for example, state-level legal barriers that restrict derivative suits, such as Universal Demand laws, lead to an increase in opportunistic insider trading.

== Procedure ==
In most jurisdictions, a shareholder must satisfy various requirements to prove that he has a valid standing before being allowed to proceed. The law may require the shareholder to meet qualifications such as the minimum value of the shares and the duration of the holding by the shareholder; to first make a demand on the corporate board to take action; or to post bond, or other fees in the event that he does not prevail.

=== Derivative suits in the United States ===
In the United States, corporate law is based on state law. Although the laws of each state differ, the laws of the states such as Delaware, New York, California, and Nevada where corporations often incorporate, institute a number of barriers to derivative suits.

Generally in these states, and under the American Bar Association guidelines, the procedure of a derivative suit is as follows. First, eligible shareholders must file a demand on the board. The board may either reject, accept, or not act upon the demand. If after a period of time the demand has been rejected or has not been acted upon, shareholders may file suit. If the board accepts the demand, the corporation itself will file the suit. If rejected, or not acted upon, the shareholder must meet additional pleading requirements. On the requirements being met by the shareholder, the board may appoint a “special litigation committee” which may move to dismiss. If the special litigation committee makes a required showing, the case will be dismissed. If the committee fails to make a showing, the shareholder suit may proceed.

This model approach is followed to a greater or lesser degree among various states. In New York, for example, derivative suits must be brought to secure a judgment "in [the corporation's] favor." Delaware has different rules in regards to demand and bond requirements too.

The famous case of Shaffer v. Heitner, which ultimately reached the United States Supreme Court, originated with a shareholder derivative suit against Greyhound Lines.

=== Derivative suits in the United Kingdom ===
In the United Kingdom, an action brought by minority shareholder(s) could only in exceptional circumstances be upheld under the doctrine of Foss v Harbottle in 1843 as to who is the "proper claimant/plaintiff". Exceptions involve ultra vires and, similarly, fraud on minority. According to Blair and Stout's Team Production Theory of Corporate Law, the purpose of such permissible suits is never to protect the shareholders, but to protect the corporation itself. Thus highly irregular emoluments or share reward schemes to the board of directors themselves or their personal extrinsic interests lend themselves to such suits. Creditors may bring an action, if a corporation inextricably faces insolvency.

Sections 302 to 306 of the Companies Act 2006 provides no new statutory class of suits but must be followed, setting out the required standard procedure. In England and Wales, this entails a prima facie case must be shown stage. This preliminary case avoids wasted time and costs. In Scotland where there had been even less clear rules on shareholder actions on behalf of the company, particularly procedurally, alike sections assist.

A confirmation of the statutory procedure being in almost all cases applicable first occurred in the leading reported case of:

- Roberts v Gill & Co Solicitors [2010] UKSC 22

=== Derivative suits in continental Europe ===
Derivative shareholder suits are extremely rare in continental Europe. The reasons probably lie within laws that prevent small shareholders from bringing lawsuits in the first place. Many European countries have company acts that legally require a minimum share in order to bring a derivative suit. Larger shareholders could bring lawsuits, however, their incentives are rather to settle the claims with the management, sometimes to the detriment of the small shareholders.

=== Derivative suits in New Zealand ===
In New Zealand these can be brought under the Companies Act 1993 section 165 only with the leave of the court. It must be in the best interest of the company to have this action brought so benefits to company must outweigh the costs of taking action.

=== Derivative suits in India ===
In India, derivative suits are brought under the clauses of oppression and mismanagement.

== See also ==
- Business judgment rule
