= Royal Trust Bank v National Westminster Bank plc =

- Court: Court of Appeal
- Full case name: Royal Trust Bank v National Westminster Bank plc and another
- Decided: 30 April 1996
- Citations: [1996] BCC 613 [1996] 2 BCLC 682

Court membership
- Judges sitting: Nourse LJ; Millett LJ; Swinton Thomas LJ

Case opinions
- Nourse LJ; Millet LJ

Keywords
- Security interest; floating charge

Royal Trust Bank v National Westminster Bank plc [1996] BCC 613 was a decision of the Court of Appeal in relation to the nature of a floating charge.

This decision, together with an academic article written by Roy Goode, is sometimes looked upon as the turning point in relation to the stricter requirements in relation to control of the proceeds of book debts and other future receivables laid down in subsequent cases.

== Facts ==
Brookes Associates Finance Limited was in the business of providing equipment under hire purchase agreements. In 1992 Royal Trust Bank (called RTB in the judgment) extended finance to the company, and took a deed of charge under which the company purported to charge the benefit of certain hire purchase agreements deposited with RTB. Those deeds of charge required all sums paid to the company under the hire purchase agreement to be deposited into a specified bank account which the company was required to open with RTB. No such bank account was ever opened, and the company deposited the sums received under those contracts into an account with National Westminster Bank, which it was free to draw upon.

Although some sums were paid to RTB from that account in repayment of the loans, when the company entered into financial difficulty, NatWest Bank blocked the account. RTB sued NatWest Bank alleging that it held the sums in that account as constructive trustee for RTB. The company did not appear and was not represented. At first instance noted that he had been advised that it was in receivership at the time of the hearing.

The case came before Jonathan Parker J who decided in favour of RTB. NatWest Bank then appealed to the Court of Appeal.

== Decision ==
Nourse LJ gave the lead judgment in the Court of Appeal, and allowed the appeal on the basis that the company had at all times been free to deal with the proceeds in those accounts, and thus it was never a trustee of them. Accordingly, it was not material what notice NatWest Bank had or had not received - it could not become a constructive trustee.

In his short decision, Millett LJ noted that the trial judge had determined that the charge created was a fixed charge, and that no appeal had been made against that finding. However, he was satisfied that this was not correct, and that the proper construction of the charge was a floating charge. Accordingly, the company was free to deal with the proceeds of the hire purchase contracts as it saw fit, including paying them over to NatWest Bank, which meant that NatWest Bank was at liberty to apply them to the company's indebtedness to it pursuant to the banker's right to combine accounts.

Millet LJ held:

As I have already pointed out, the proper characterisation of a security as 'fixed' or 'floating' depends upon the freedom of the chargor to deal with the proceeds of the charged assets in the ordinary course of business free from the security. A contractual right in the chargor to collect the proceeds and pay them into its own bank account for use in the ordinary course of business is the badge of a floating charge and is inconsistent with the existence of a fixed charge: see Re Brightlife [1986] BCLC 418 at 422, [1987] Ch 200 at 209. I would, therefore, for my own part, and notwithstanding the concession made by National Westminster before us, characterise the charge created by cl 3 as a floating charge, notice of the existence of which would not affect the priority of National Westminster's rights in respect of the moneys in the No 2 account.

== Authority ==
The decision of Millet LJ is sometimes looked upon as a turning point in the characterisation of charges over book debts (as either fixed or floating) from the more permissive approach taken in earlier decisions like Siebe Gorman & Co Ltd v Barclays Bank Ltd [1979] 2 Lloyd's Rep 142 and Re New Bullas Trading Ltd [1994] 1 BCLC 485, to the stricter approach evident in later cases such as Re Brumark Investments Ltd [2001] UKPC 28 (where Lord Millett gave the opinion of the Privy Council) and Re Spectrum Plus Ltd [2005] UKHL 41.
