= Re Peachdart Ltd =

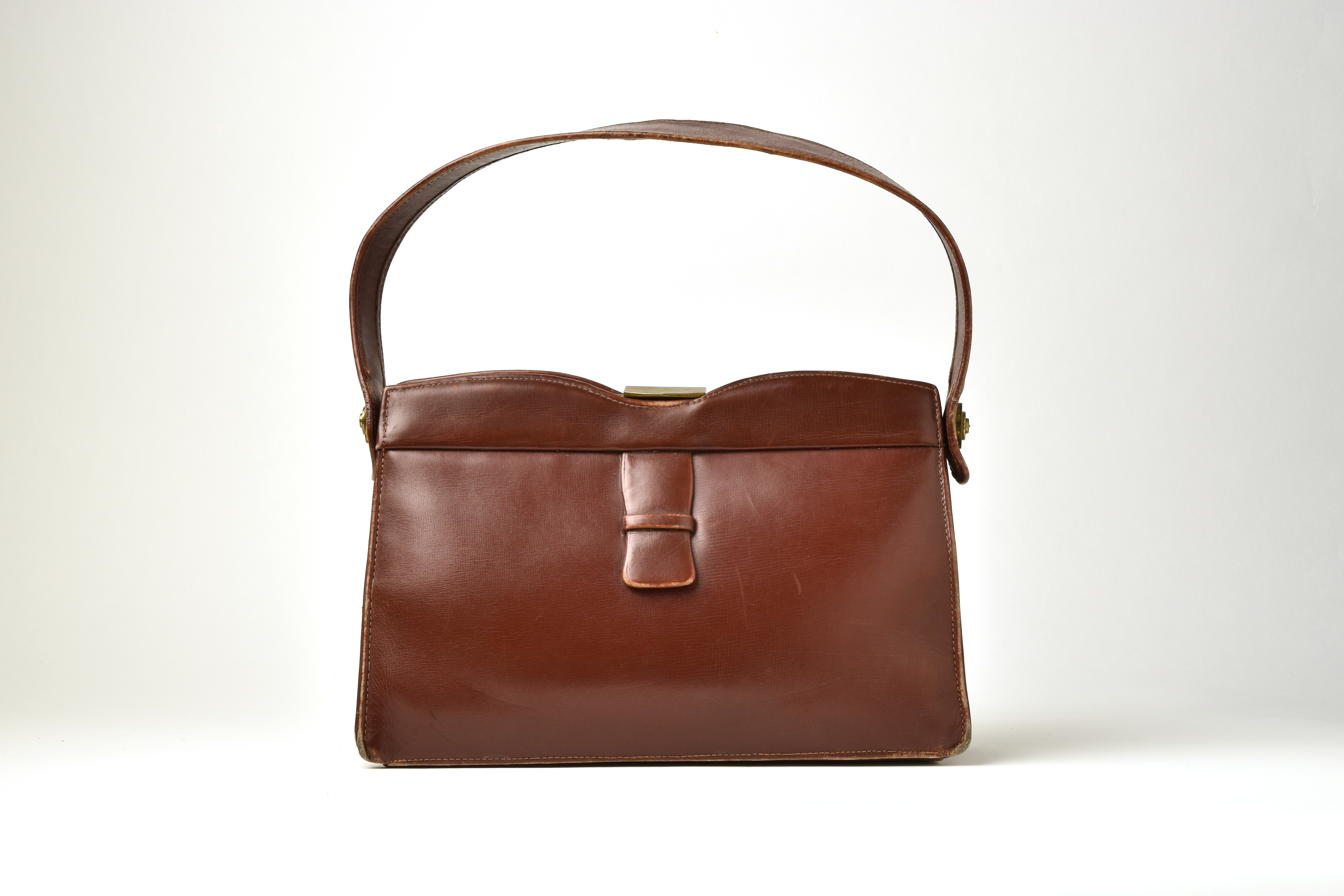
- Court: High Court
- Full case name: Re Peachdart Ltd
- Decided: 11 March 1983
- Citations: [1984] Ch 131 [1983] 3 All ER 204

Court membership
- Judge sitting: Vinelott J

Keywords
- Title retention clause; recharacterisation; floating charge

Re Peachdart Ltd [1984] Ch 131 is a judicial decision relating to retention of title clauses, and the extent to which the vendor of a raw material can seek to assert title to goods into which those raw materials are subsequently worked. The court held that seeking to assert title to the subsequently worked goods had the effect of creating an equitable charge, which was void for non-registration under the Companies Act.

== Facts ==
The company, Peachdart Ltd, carried on the business of manufacturing leather handbags. The company had granted a debenture to Barclays Bank which contained a floating charge over all of the company's assets. That floating charge was duly registered under the Companies Act 1948.

Freudenberg Leather Co Ltd supplied substantially all of the leather used by the company. The leather was sold under contracts of sale which included a retention of title clause. That clause provided not only did title to the leather remain vested in Freudenberg after delivery up until they time that they were paid, but that Freudenberg could trace their title into any goods into which the leather was worked.

The company began to experience financial difficulties, and on 10 August 1981 Barclays Bank appointed receivers. A dispute then arose as to which creditor had better title to the leather - Barclays Bank under the floating charge, or Freudenberg under the retention of title clause. The receivers challenged the clause on the basis that the power to trace title into subsequent products meant that the arrangement was effectively an equitable charge, which was void for non-registration.

== Decision ==
The case came before Vinelott J.

The parties acknowledged that these issues had come before the courts several times, most notably in the leading cases of Aluminium Industrie Vaassen BV v Romalpa Aluminium Ltd [1976] 1 WLR 676, Re Bond Worth Ltd [1980] Ch 228 and Borden (UK) Ltd v Scottish Timber Products Ltd [1981] Ch 25. However counsel for Freudenberg sought to distinguish those cases, arguing that in the case of a leather handbag, the leather was still readily identifiable. It had simply been cut and restitched, but clearly not been destroyed by the process.

Vinelott J rejected that argument. He held that at law the manufacturing process essentially created a new species of property, and that an attempt to trace title into that property took effect as an equitable charge, and accordingly, that provision in the contract of sale was void for non-registration under the mandatory statutory provisions applicable to company charges.

== Authority ==
As of 2013 this case is still accepted as authoritative.
