= Re Bond Worth Ltd =

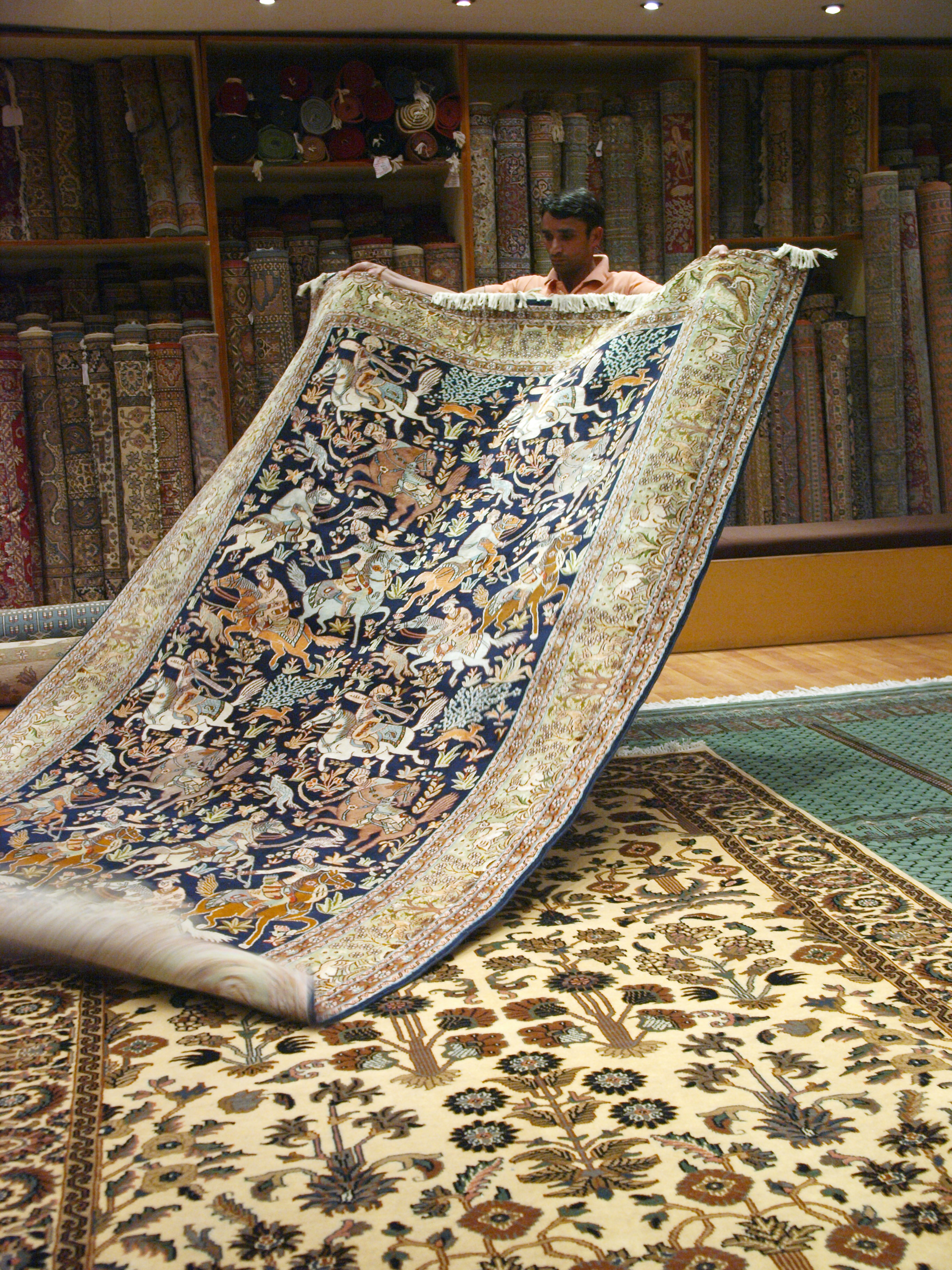
- Court: High Court
- Decided: 12 February 1979
- Citation: [1980] Ch 228

Court membership
- Judge sitting: Slade J

Keywords
- Insolvency; Recharacterisation; retention of title

Re Bond Worth Ltd [1980] Ch 228 is a UK insolvency law case, concerning retention of title clauses.

== Facts ==
Bond Worth Ltd was a carpet manufacturing company. It bought man-made fibres from Monsanto Ltd and used them to make carpets. The conditions of sale included a "retention of title" clause. Bond Worth Ltd went into receivership when a large sum of money was owing to Monsanto Ltd under various contracts containing the "title" clause. Monsanto Ltd notified the receivers of their claim. The receivers contested whether the retention of title clause was valid.

The joint receivers issued summons for determination claiming that (1) although the clause referred to "equitable and beneficial ownership" it did not have the effect of creating a bare trust for the benefit of the sellers, but rather it created a floating equitable charge in favour of the sellers; and (2) such a floating charge created by the buyer company would therefore be registerable, and so was void for non-registration.

== Trial ==
The trial lasted a total of 15 days. Notable counsel who appeared included Jeremiah Harman QC and Elizabeth Gloster.

== Judgment ==
Slade J held the clause, which referred to "equitable and beneficial ownership", did not create a bare trust for Monsanto's benefit, but did create a floating equitable charge. This followed from Coburn v Collins (1887) 35 ChD 373 and Illingworth v Houldsworth [1903] 2 Ch 284 was applied. Aluminium Industrie Vaassen BV v Romalpa Aluminium [1976] 1 WLR 676 was distinguished. Because the floating charge was created by the buyer company and therefore registrable, it was void for non-registration.
