= Welsh Development Agency v Export Finance Co Ltd =

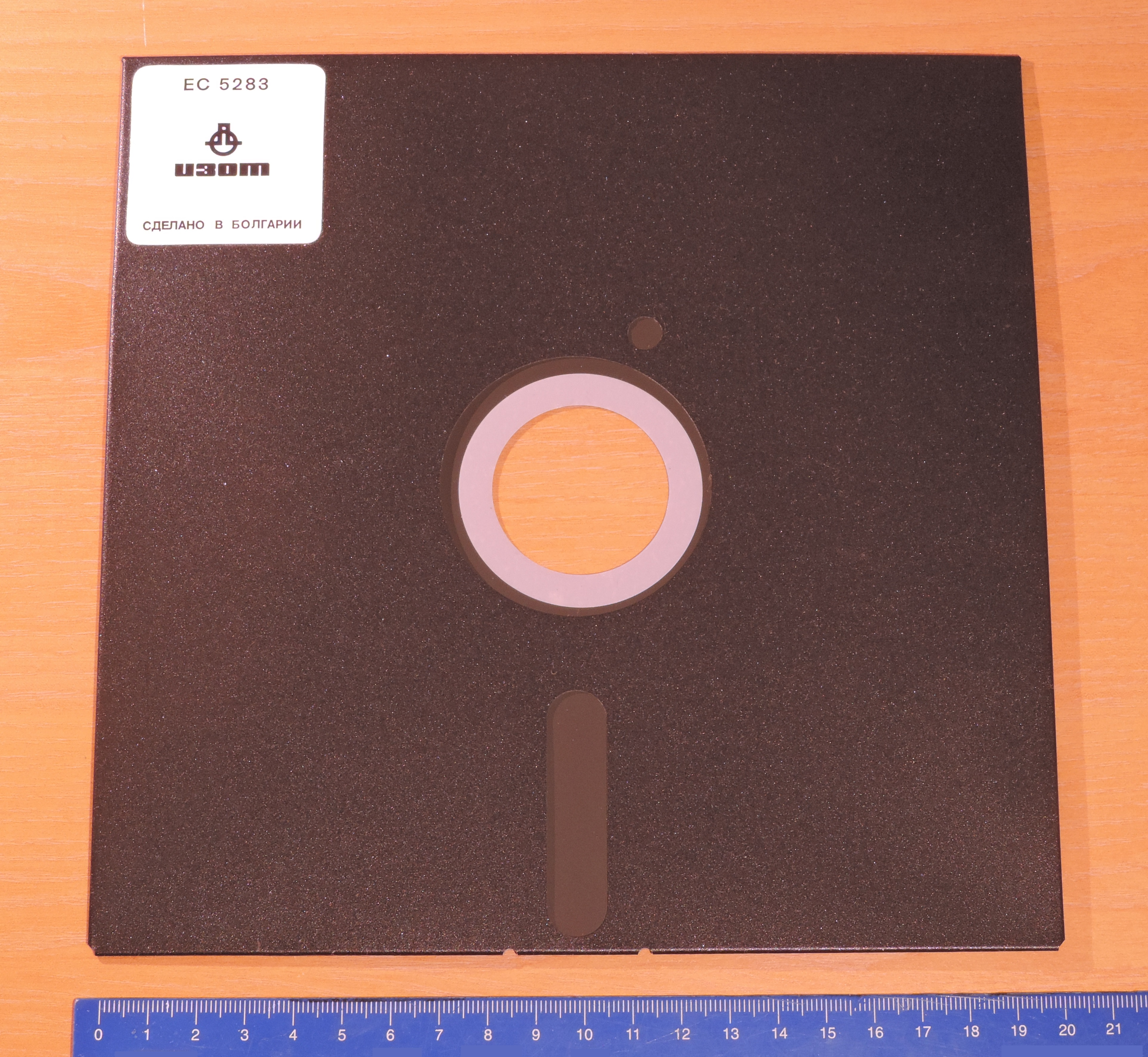
- Court: Court of Appeal
- Full case name: Welsh Development Agency v Export Finance Co Ltd
- Decided: 19 November 1991
- Citations: [1992] BCLC 148 [1992] BCC 270 [1992] JBL 541

Court membership
- Judges sitting: Dillon LJ; Ralph Gibson LJ; Staughton LJ

Keywords
- recharacterisation; mortgage; retention of title

Welsh Development Agency v Export Finance Co Ltd [1992] BCLC 148 (often abbreviated to WDA v Exfinco) is a judicial decision of the English Court of Appeal. The decision related to a number of aspects relating to complex financing arrangement, but is most often cited for the decision in relation to recharacterisation.

The decision is now probably the leading English law case in relation to recharacterisation risk in financial transactions.

== Facts ==
The Parrot Corporation was a company which manufactured and exported floppy disks. The company was a start-up venture funded by the Welsh Development Agency (WDA). As part of the financing provided to the company by the WDA, the WDA took security by means of an all-assets floating charge over the company's assets and undertaking.

The company then sought to raise further finance from the Export Finance Co Ltd (Exfinco). That financing was documented principally under a master agreement which Staughton LJ referred to in the judgment as "a document of remarkable complexity". Under that agreement, broadly, every time the company agreed an overseas sale, it triggered a mandatory offer from Exfinco to buy the goods from the company, and then promptly resell the goods to the overseas purchaser. In relation to the resale the company would act as agent for Exfinco and Exfinco would be the undisclosed principal. Accordingly, the only person whom the overseas buyers ever dealt with was the company - they were unaware of the role played by Exfinco in each and every sale. The company would then also receive the purchase price from the overseas buyer as agent for Exfinco, and those sums would be paid into a segregated account which was completely under the control of Exfinco. The goods sold overseas would be subject to a title retention clause in favour of Exfinco.

The Parrot Corporation began to encounter severe financial difficulties, partly because of the collapse in the price of floppy disks, but also allegations of financial irregularities swirled around the company. On 16 May 1989 the company ceased trading, and a dispute arose between WDA and Exfinco as to whether the arrangements under the master agreement were effective, and accordingly who had the better claim to moneys paid (and still payable) by overseas buyers to the company.

== Decision ==
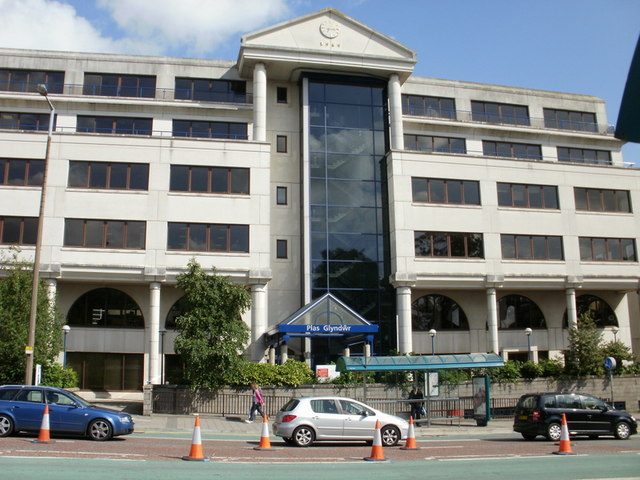
Welsh Development Agency's headquarters in Cardiff.

=== High Court ===
At first instance the matter came before Sir Nicolas Browne-Wilkinson VC. The Vice-Chancellor ruled in favour of WDA on two alternative grounds.

- Firstly, he held that at the time the agreement between the company and the overseas buyer was entered into, it was not possible to determine at that time whether any particular sale was entered into by the company for its own account or as agent for Exfinco. Accordingly, he held that the agreement was not enforceable for uncertainty.
- Secondly, he held that if the agreement was enforceable, the true commercial effect was that nothing was actually sold to Exfinco, and so the effect was to create a charge over the goods, and that charge would be void for non-registration under section 395 of the Companies Act 1985.

=== Court of Appeal ===
Exfinco appealed against the Vice Chancellor's decision, and also lodged counterclaims against the receivers appointed by the WDA for tortious interference with their property.

All three judges of the Court of Appeal gave reasoned judgments, but the first and longest judgment was given by Dillon LJ.

Dillon LJ considered a preliminary point as to whether WDA could be taken to have consented to the financing arrangements by virtue of the fact that they had appointed a director to the board of the company, and thus the proper construction of the debenture granted to WDA was to exclude receivables from overseas buyers. That suggestion was summarily dismissed as wholly inconsistent with the terms of the document.

==== Contractual uncertainty ====
After reviewing the key terms of the master agreement, he then turned to the issue of fundamental uncertainty. He held that to the extent that there was any uncertainty, it could be resolved under the legal maxim id certum est quod certum reddi potest ("if something is capable of being made certain, it should be treated as certain"). In this case it was possible to ascertain by inquiry in any individual case on what basis the contract was made. Applying the test set down by Lord Dunedin in May & Butcher Ltd v R [1934] 2 KB 17 at 21 and Lord Diplock in Sudbrook Trading Estate Ltd v Eggleton [1983] 1 AC 444 at 478. Under the master agreement the question as to who was the principal under the agreement would only arise in the event of a claim for breach of warranty as to the fitness of the goods. This was entirely consistent with older cases relating to subsequent inquiries in relation to alleged latent defects in shipments of goods.

On this point, Staughton LJ agreed. Ralph Gibson LJ was initially hesitant, describing it as an "uneasy application" of the legal principle, but ultimately also concurred.

==== Recharacterisation ====
In relation to the issue of recharacterisation, Dillon LJ commenced by differentiating between "sham transactions" and transactions where the true character was not as described in the documents. He also noted that the different authorities on recharacterisation tend to use very different language depending upon the particular legal field: "It is ... not surprising that the words used by eminent judges in different cases in applying the principle do not all fit very harmoniously together." Slightly less kindly Staughton LJ referred to the "bewildering array of authority on this topic, some of it by no means easy to reconcile."

He then carefully reviewed the authorities, and quoted at length from the decision of Romer LJ in Re George Inglefield Ltd [1933] Ch 1 at 27–28 in relation to the essential differences between a sale transaction and a mortgage transaction. However, having reviewed the position he was driven to conclude:

In my judgment there is no one clear touchstone by which it can necessarily and inevitably be said that a document which is not a sham and which is expressed as an agreement for sale must necessarily, as a matter of law, amount to no more than the creation of a mortgage or charge on the property expressed to be sold.

Instead, he sought to apply the decision of Lord Herschell in McEntire v Crossley Bros [1895] AC 457 at 462-463 where he said: "...the agreement must be regarded as a whole - its substance must be looked at. The parties cannot, by the insertion of any mere words, defeat the effect of the transaction as appearing from the whole of the agreement into which they have entered. ... you must look at the agreement as a whole and see what its substantial effect is." In this case, at trial, the Vice Chancellor has been concerned that the clauses in the master agreement under the headings "the right of redemption" and "the discount" were consistent with a mortgage, but not with a true sale. However Dillon LJ took the view that it was wrong to take those clauses in isolation and they needed to be read together with the other clauses relating to sale. He then reviewed various cases which considered the difference between charging interest on a loan, and sales made on a discounted basis.

After a very long and careful review of the terms of the document, Dillon LJ concluded that a security arrangement was inconsistent with the express terms of the document. He noted the comments of Lord Wilberforce in Lloyds & Scottish Finance Ltd v Cyril Lord Carpet Sales Ltd [1992] BCLC 609 at 615: "It would be a strange doctrine of 'looking for the substance' or 'looking through the documents' which would produce a contractual intention so clearly negated by the documents and by oral evidence." Applying that test, Dillon LJ held:

I would none the less hold that it is valid as what it purports to be, namely an agreement for the sale by Parrot to Exfinco, by acceptance of a standing offer, of goods about to be sold by Parrot to overseas buyers.

Ralph Gibson LJ briefly agreed on this point, without considering it in detail. Staughton LJ reviewed all of the arguments raised by WDA, but concluded that "none [are] in my opinion inconsistent with a contract of sale." Accordingly, he upheld the parties' bargain.

==== Liability of receivers ====
In relation to the counterclaim of Exfinco against the receivers for interfering with the unpaid receivables from the overseas buyers the court split: Dillon LJ and Ralph Gibson LJ dismissed the counterclaim, but Staughton LJ dissented on this point. The majority broadly held that because the receivers were agents of the company itself, they could not be liable for inducing any breach of contract where the company was the principal under the relevant contracts. Dillon LJ felt that he was bound by the decision in Said v Butt [1920] 3 KB 497, although he expressed "grave reservations" over the reasoning. But ultimately he was not prepared to overturn an authority which had stood for so long.

Staughton LJ dissented on the basis that the entire point of the arrangement was that the company was not the principal under those contracts - Exfinco was the principal, and the company was only its agent. Accordingly, the receivers should still be subject to liability if they intentionally interfered with what, in law, was a contract of sale between the overseas buyer and Exfinco.

All three judges agreed that section 234 of the Insolvency Act 1986 would not afford a defence to the receivers if they were otherwise liable.

== Authority ==
The decision is now treated as the leading authority in relation to characterisation issues in finance contracts. It has subsequently been cited with approval in various judicial decisions, including:

- Lavin v Johnson [2002] EWCA Civ 1138
- Dutton v Davis [2006] EWCA Civ 694
- Brighton and Hove City Council v Audus [2009] EWHC 340 (Ch)

The decision is sometimes contrasted with Re Curtain Dream plc [1990] BCLC 925, a case decided at broadly the same time and on similar facts, but which reached the opposite conclusion. An appeal in Re Curtain Dream was compromised after the decision of the Court of Appeal was handed down in WDA v Exfinco.
