= Re Brumark Investments Ltd =

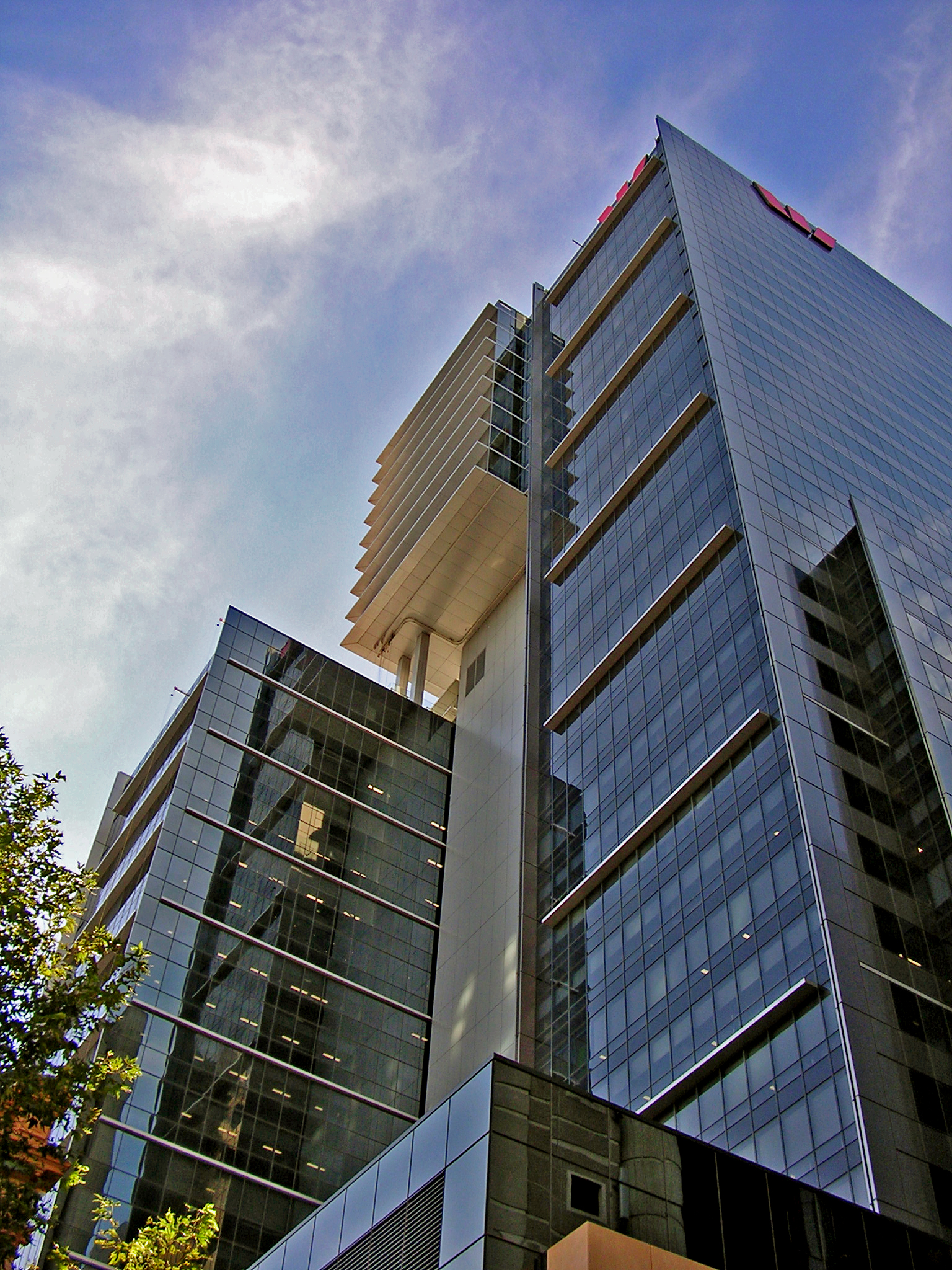
- Court: Privy Council
- Full case name: Agnew v Commissioners of Inland Revenue
- Decided: 5 June 2001
- Citations: [2001] UKPC 28, [2001] 2 AC 710, [2001] 2 BCLC 188

Case history
- Prior action: Court of Appeal

Court membership
- Judges sitting: Lord Bingham of Cornhill, Lord Nicholls of Birkenhead, Lord Hoffmann, Lord Hobhouse of Woodborough, Lord Millett

Keywords
- Security interest, floating charge

Agnew v Commissioners of Inland Revenue, more commonly referred to as Re Brumark Investments Ltd [2001] UKPC 28 is a decision of the Privy Council relating to New Zealand and UK insolvency law, concerning the taking of a security interest over a company's assets, the proper characterisation of a floating charge, and the priority of creditors in a company winding-up.

== Facts ==
Brumark Investments Ltd gave security over debts to its bank, Westpac. The terms were that its security was a fixed charge, but a floating charge when proceeds were collected (the same as drafted as in Re New Bullas Trading Ltd). Brumark was free to collect debts for its own account and to use proceeds in its business. Brumark went into receivership. The receivers collected the outstanding debts.

Fisher J held that uncollected debts were subject to a fixed charge, as the parties had agreed. So they were not subject to claims of preferential creditors. The Court of Appeal of New Zealand overturned this and held that the fact Brumark could collect the debts for its own account (and hence remove them from the bank's security) made it a floating charge. So the preferential creditors had a prior claim.

== Advice ==
The Privy Council advised that it was indeed a floating charge. It said the court's task is not to ask whether the parties intended to create a fixed or floating charge, but to ask what rights the parties intended to create, and then decide as a matter of law whether it is fixed or floating. Lord Millett held that Nourse LJ's approach in New Bullas based on freedom of contract was 'fundamentally mistaken'. The process of construction required assessing what was intended, but this meant looking at the substance of the transaction, not its form. He noted that in Siebe Gorman & Co Ltd v Barclays Bank Ltd and In re Keenan Bros Ltd the proceeds of the book debts were not at the free disposal of the company - that is why these were fixed charges - the proceeds were not available to the company as a source of its cash flow.

1. The question in this appeal is whether a charge over the uncollected book debts of a company which leaves the company free to collect them and use the proceeds in the ordinary course of its business is a fixed charge or a floating charge.

4. ... The question is whether the company's right to collect the debts and deal with their proceeds free from the security means that the charge on the uncollected debts, though described in the debenture as fixed, was nevertheless a floating charge until it crystallised by the appointment of the receivers. This is a question of characterisation. To answer it their Lordships must examine the nature of a floating charge and ascertain the features which distinguish it from a fixed charge. They propose to start by tracing the history of the floating charge from its inception to the present day, paying particular attention to charges over book debts.

5. The floating charge originated in England in a series of cases in the Chancery Division in the 1870s: In re Panama, New Zealand, and Australian Royal Mail Co (1870) 5 Ch App 318 (generally regarded as the first case in which the floating charge was recognised); In re Florence Land and Public Works Co, Ex p. Moor (1878) 10 Ch D 530; In re Hamilton's Windsor Ironworks Co., Ex p. Pitman & Edwards (1879) 12 Ch D 707; and In re Colonial Trusts Corporation, Ex p. Bradshaw (1879) 15 Ch D 465. Two things led to this development. First, the possibility of assigning future property in equity was confirmed in Holroyd v Marshall (1862) 10 HL Cas 191. The principle was of general application and made it possible for future book debts to be assigned by way of security: Tailby v Official Receiver (1888) 13 App Cas 523. Secondly, the Companies Clauses Consolidation Act 1845 sanctioned a form of mortgage for use by statutory companies by which the company assigned "its undertaking". It was natural that this formula should afterwards be adopted by companies incorporated under the Companies Act 1862.

[...]

12. The most celebrated, and certainly the most often cited, description of a floating charge is that given by Romer LJ in In re Yorkshire Woolcombers Association Ltd [1903] 2 Ch D 284 at p. 295:

"I certainly do not intend to attempt to give an exact definition of the term "floating charge," nor am I prepared to say that there will not be a floating charge within the meaning of the Act, which does not contain all the three characteristics that I am about to mention, but I certainly think that if a charge has the three characteristics that I am about to mention it is a floating charge. (1.) If it is a charge on a class of assets of a company present and future; (2.) if that class is one which, in the ordinary course of the business of the company, would be changing from time to time; and (3.) if you find that by the charge it is contemplated that, until some future step is taken by or on behalf of those interested in the charge, the company may carry on its business in the ordinary way as far as concerns the particular class of assets I am dealing with."

13. This was offered as a description and not a definition. The first two characteristics are typical of a floating charge but they are not distinctive of it, since they are not necessarily inconsistent with a fixed charge. It is the third characteristic which is the hallmark of a floating charge and serves to distinguish it from a fixed charge. Since the existence of a fixed charge would make it impossible for the company to carry on business in the ordinary way without the consent of the charge holder, it follows that its ability to so without such consent is inconsistent with the fixed nature of the charge.

[...]

29. The question in New Bullas, as in the present case, was whether the book debts which were uncollected when the receivers were appointed were subject to a fixed charge or a floating charge. At first instance Knox J, following Brightlife, held that they were subject to a floating charge. His decision was reversed by the Court of Appeal. Nourse LJ gave the only judgment.

30. He began by observing that, there being usually no need to deal with a book debt before collection, an uncollected book debt is a natural subject of a fixed charge; but once collected, the proceeds being needed for the conduct of the business, it becomes a natural subject of a floating charge. Their Lordships regard this as unsound: one might equally well say that unsold trading stock is a suitable subject of a fixed charge. Trading stock, that is to say goods held for sale and delivery to customers, and book debts, that is to say debts owed by customers to whom goods have been supplied or services rendered, are equally part of a trader's circulating capital. The trader does not hold them for enjoyment in specie. They provide him with his cash flow and as such are the natural subjects of a floating charge. His ability to carry on business depends upon his freedom to realise such assets by turning them into money and back again.

31. The principal theme of the judgment, however, was that the parties were free to make whatever agreement they liked. The question was therefore simply one of construction; unless unlawful the intention of the parties, to be gathered from the terms of the debenture, must prevail. It was clear from the descriptions which the parties attached to the charges that they had intended to create a fixed charge over the book debts while they were uncollected and a floating charge over the proceeds. It was open to the parties to do so, and freedom of contract prevailed.

32. Their Lordships consider this approach to be fundamentally mistaken. The question is not merely one of construction. In deciding whether a charge is a fixed charge or a floating charge, the Court is engaged in a two-stage process. At the first stage it must construe the instrument of charge and seek to gather the intentions of the parties from the language they have used. But the object at this stage of the process is not to discover whether the parties intended to create a fixed or a floating charge. It is to ascertain the nature of the rights and obligations which the parties intended to grant each other in respect of the charged assets. Once these have been ascertained, the Court can then embark on the second stage of the process, which is one of categorisation. This is a matter of law. It does not depend on the intention of the parties. If their intention, properly gathered from the language of the instrument, is to grant the company rights in respect of the charged assets which are inconsistent with the nature of a fixed charge, then the charge cannot be a fixed charge however they may have chosen to describe it. A similar process is involved in construing a document to see whether it creates a licence or tenancy. The Court must construe the grant to ascertain the intention of the parties: but the only intention which is relevant is the intention to grant exclusive possession: see Street v Mountford [1985] AC 809 at p. 826 per Lord Templeman. So here: in construing a debenture to see whether it creates a fixed or a floating charge, the only intention which is relevant is the intention that the company should be free to deal with the charged assets and withdraw them from the security without the consent of the holder of the charge; or, to put the question another way, whether the charged assets were intended to be under the control of the company or of the charge holder.

33. In New Bullas the preferential creditors argued that the charge was a floating charge because the company was indeed free to withdraw the book debts from the security, which it could do simply by collecting them and using the proceeds in the ordinary course of its business. Nourse LJ rejected this, holding that it was not correct to say that the book debts could cease to be subject to the fixed charge at the will of the company; they ceased to be subject to the fixed charge because that is what the parties had agreed in advance when they entered into the debenture.

34. Their Lordships agree with Fisher J in the present case that this reasoning cannot be supported. It is entirely destructive of the floating charge. Every charge, whether fixed or floating, derives from contract. The company's freedom to deal with the charged assets without the consent of the holder of the charge, which is what makes it a floating charge, is of necessity a contractual freedom derived from the agreement of the parties when they entered into the debenture. To find the consent in question in the original agreement would turn every floating charge into a fixed charge.

35. The decision has attracted much academic comment, much (though not all) of it hostile. Most interest, perhaps not surprisingly, has been generated by the novel attempt to separate the book debts from their proceeds: see for example Professor Goode: "Charges over Book Debts: A Missed Opportunity" (1994) 110 LQR 592; Sarah Worthington: "Fixed Charges over Book Debts and other Receivables" (1997) 113 LQR 562; Berg per contra: "Charges over Book Debts: A Reply" [1995] JBL 443. Their Lordships will return to this aspect after they have examined the other reasons given by Fisher J for following New Bullas in the present case.

43. Property and its proceeds are clearly different assets. On a sale of goods the seller exchanges one asset for another. Both assets continue to exist, the goods in the hands of the buyer and proceeds of sale in the hands of the seller. If a book debt is assigned, the debt is transferred to the assignee in exchange for money paid to the assignor. The seller's former property right in the subject matter of the sale give him an equivalent property right in its exchange product. The only difference between realising a debt by assignment and collection is that, on collection, the debt is wholly extinguished. As in the case of alienation, it is replaced in the hands of the creditor by a different asset, viz. its proceeds.

44. The Court of Appeal saw no reason to examine the conceptual problems further. They held that, even if a debt and its proceeds are two different assets, the company was free to realise the uncollected debts, and accordingly the charge on those assets (being the assets whose destination was in dispute) could not be a fixed charge. There was simply no need to look at the proceeds at all...

45. ...if the company is free to collect the debts, the nature of the charge on the uncollected debts cannot differ according to whether the proceeds are subject to a floating charge or are not subject to any charge. In each case the commercial effect is the same: the charge holder cannot prevent the company from collecting the debts and having the free use of the proceeds. But it does not follow that the nature of the charge on the uncollected book debts may not differ according to whether the proceeds are subject to a fixed charge or a floating charge; for in the one case the charge holder can prevent the company from having the use of the proceeds and in the other it cannot. The question is not whether the company is free to collect the uncollected debts, but whether it is free to do so for its own benefit. For this purpose it is necessary to consider what it may do with the proceeds.

[...]

48. To constitute a charge on book debts a fixed charge, it is sufficient to prohibit the company from realising the debts itself, whether by assignment or collection. If the company seeks permission to do so in respect of a particular debt, the charge holder can refuse permission or grant permission on terms, and can thus direct the application of the proceeds. But it is not necessary to go this far. As their Lordships have already noted, it is not inconsistent with the fixed nature of a charge on book debts for the holder of the charge to appoint the company its agent to collect the debts for its account and on its behalf. Siebe Gorman and Re Keenan merely introduced an alternative mechanism for appropriating the proceeds to the security. The proceeds of the debts collected by the company were no longer to be trust moneys but they were required to be paid into a blocked account with the charge holder. The commercial effect was the same: the proceeds were not at the company's disposal. Such an arrangement is inconsistent with the charge being a floating charge, since the debts are not available to the company as a source of its cash flow. But their Lordships would wish to make it clear that it is not enough to provide in the debenture that the account is a blocked account if it is not operated as one in fact.

== See also ==
- UK insolvency law – Law in the United Kingdom of Great Britain and Northern Ireland
