= Re Spectrum Plus Ltd =

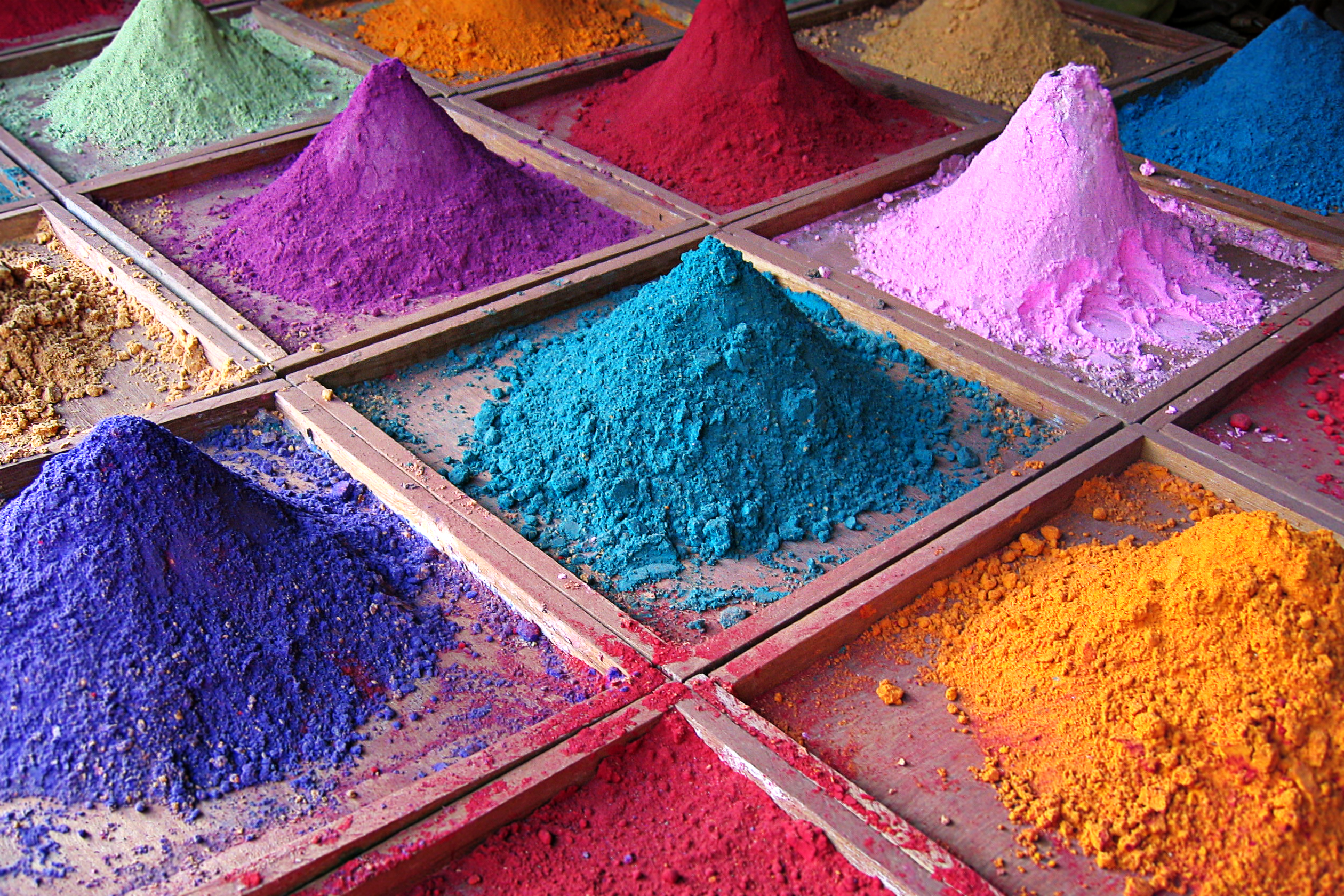
- Court: House of Lords
- Full case name: National Westminster Bank plc v Spectrum Plus Limited and others
- Citations: [2005] UKHL 41 [2005] 2 AC 680 [2005] 3 WLR 58 [2005] BCC 694
- Transcript: Full text of judgment

Court membership
- Judges sitting: Lord Nicholls of Birkenhead; Lord Steyn; Lord Hope of Craighead; Lord Scott of Foscote; Lord Walker of Gestingthorpe; Baroness Hale of Richmond; Lord Brown of Eaton-under-Heywood

Case opinions
- Lord Nicholls; Lord Hope; Lord Scott; Lord Walker

Keywords
- floating charge; recharacterisation; prospective overruling

Re Spectrum Plus Ltd [2005] UKHL 41 was a UK company law decision of House of Lords that settled a number of outstanding legal issues relating to floating charges and recharacterisation risk under the English common law. However, the House of Lords also discussed the power of the court to make rulings as to the law that were "prospective only" to mitigate potential harshness when issuing a ruling that was different from what the law had previously been understood to be.

== Facts ==
Spectrum Plus Ltd ("Spectrum") carried on the business of a manufacturer of dyes, paints, pigments and other chemical products for the paint industry. Spectrum opened an overdraft facility, and made an agreement with, National Westminster Bank plc ("NatWest") that said it was granting a fixed charge, or in the words of the contract, a "specific charge [of] all book debts and other debts ... now and from time to time due or owing to [Spectrum]" to secure a £250,000 overdraft. Spectrum was prohibited from charging or assigning debts, and was required to pay the proceeds of collection into a NatWest account. But there were no restrictions on Spectrum’s operation of the account. Spectrum’s account was always overdrawn but it used the proceeds of the debts as and when it was necessary. When Spectrum went into liquidation, NatWest argued that the charge was a fixed charge over book debts and proceeds. The Inland Revenue, which was a major creditor, argued the debenture was merely a floating charge, so its claim for tax owed took priority over the bank under section 175 of the Insolvency Act 1986. At stake was merely £16,136, but the case was a test case.

It was apparent that if the House of Lords decided in favour of the Inland Revenue, the expectations of a significant number of banks, who had relied on being able to have "fixed charges" and thus absolute priority in insolvency, would be defeated. Many people had assumed, or at least argued they had assumed that the law since Siebe Gorman & Co Ltd v Barclays Bank Ltd was that if book debts were paid into a separate account, then a charge over them would be deemed to be fixed. Accordingly, it was submitted that if the Lords were to overrule Siebe Gorman, they should only do so prospectively, and not retrospectively.

== Judgment ==
In the High Court, the Vice Chancellor held, applying the ruling of Lord Millett in the Privy Council decision of Agnew v Commissioners of Inland Revenue (Re Brumark) and declining to follow Re New Bullas Trading Ltd, that because the charge allowed Spectrum to use the proceeds of the debts in the normal course of business it must have been a floating charge (therefore not following Siebe Gorman & Co Ltd v Barclays Bank Ltd either). In the Court of Appeal, Lord Phillips MR held that he was bound by Bullas and where a chargor is prohibited from disposing of receivables before they are collected and must pay them into a chargee’s account, the charge must be construed as fixed. He said Siebe Gorman was correctly decided given that the debenture there clearly restricted the company’s ability to draw on the bank account into which the proceeds of the book debts were paid. The Siebe Gorman form of debenture had been followed for 25 years, and therefore had acquired meaning. Jonathan Parker LJ and Jacob LJ concurred.

=== House of Lords ===
The House of Lords, with seven members given the constitutional issue of retrospective rulings, held that the charge over Spectrum Plus Ltd's book debts was floating, because the hallmark of a floating charge is that the business is free to deal with the assets in business as usual. Also relevant, but not determinative were the extent of the restrictions imposed by the debenture, the rights retained by Spectrum to deal with its debtors and collect the money owed by them, Spectrum's right to draw on its account with the bank into which the collected debts had to be paid, provided it kept within the overdraft limit, the description "fixed charge" attributed to the charge by the parties themselves. Even though the money was put into a separate account, that was the case here. The decision of Slade J in Siebe Gorman & Co Ltd v Barclays Bank had been subject to serious academic criticism, and had been doubted by Hoffmann J in Re Brightlife Ltd. Although Siebe Gorman was followed and extended by the English Court of Appeal in Re New Bullas Trading Ltd it was wrong and was overruled. Recognising freedom to deal with assets as the hallmark of a floating charge was necessary to give effect to the purpose of the legislation on floating charges, and the statutory system of priority.

52. ...it is competent for anyone to whom book debts may accrue in the future to create for good consideration an equitable charge upon those book debts which will attach to them as soon as they come into existence. But if this is to be effective as a fixed security everything depends on the way the security agreement ensures that the charge over the book debts is fixed. It is not easy to reconcile the company's need to continue to collect and use these sums for its own business purposes with the lender's wish to escape from the priority which section 175(2)(b) gives to preferential debts over the claims of the holder of a floating charge by subjecting the uncollected book debts to a security which will operate as a fixed charge over them.

Did Spectrum's debenture create a fixed charge?

53. My noble and learned friend, Lord Scott of Foscote has described the facts of the case and summarised all the relevant authorities. I adopt with gratitude all that he has said about them, and I agree with him that the charge which the company granted by way of what the debenture described as a specific charge over its book debts and other debts then and from time to time owing to the company was in law a floating charge. It was not a fixed charge, so section 175(2)(b) applies to it. The preferential creditors have priority over the bank's claims under the debenture to the sums realisable from the book debts and other debts of the company.

54. There are, as Professor Sarah Worthington has pointed out, a limited number of ways to ensure that a charge over book debts is fixed: An 'Unsatisfactory Area of the Law' - Fixed and Floating Charges Yet Again, (2004) 1 International Corporate Rescue, 175, 182. One is to prevent all dealings with the book debts so that they are preserved for the benefit of the chargee's security. This is the only method which is known to Scots law which, as I have said, insists upon assignation of the book debts to the security holder and its intimation to the company's debtor as the equivalent of their delivery. One can, of course, be confident where this method is used that the book debts will be permanently appropriated to the security which is given to the chargee. But a company that wishes to continue to trade will usually find the commercial consequences of such an arrangement unacceptable. Another is to prevent all dealings with the book debts other than their collection, and to require the proceeds when collected to be paid to the chargee in reduction of the chargor's outstanding debt. But this method too is likely to be unacceptable to a company which wishes to carry on its business as normally as possible by maintaining its cash flow and its working capital. A third is to prevent all dealings with the debts other than their collection, and to require the collected proceeds to be paid into an account with the chargee bank. That account must then be blocked so as to preserve the proceeds for the benefit of the chargee's security. A fourth is to prevent all dealings with the debts other than their collection and to require the collected proceeds to be paid into a separate account with a third party bank. The chargee then takes a fixed charge over that account so as to preserve the sums paid into it for the benefit of its security.

55. The method that was selected in this case comes closest to the third of these. It was selected, no doubt, because it enabled the company to continue to trade as normally as possible while restricting it, at the same time, to some degree as to what it could do with the book debts. The critical question is whether the restrictions that it imposed went far enough. There is no doubt that their effect was to prevent the company from entering into transactions with any third party in relation to the book debts prior to their collection. The uncollected book debts were to be held exclusively for the benefit of the bank. But everything then depended on the nature of the account with the bank into which the proceeds were to paid under the arrangement described in clause 5 of the debenture. As McCarthy J said in In re Keenan Bros Ltd [1986] BCLC 242, 247, one must look, not at the declared intention of the parties alone, but to the effect of the instruments whereby they purported to carry out that intention. Was the account one which allowed the company to continue to use the proceeds of the book debts as a source of its cash flow or was it one which, on the contrary, preserved the proceeds intact for the benefit of the bank's security? Was it, putting the point shortly, a blocked account?

56. I do not see how this question can be answered without examining the contractual relationship in regard to that account between the bank and its customer. An account from which the customer is entitled to withdraw funds whenever it wishes within the agreed limits of any overdraft is not a blocked account. In Agnew v Commissioners of Inland Revenue [2001] 2 AC 710, 722, para 22 Lord Millett said that the critical feature which led the Irish Supreme Court in In re Keenan Bros Ltd [1986] BCLC 242 to characterise the charge on book debts as a fixed charge was that their proceeds were to be segregated in a blocked account where they would be frozen and unusable by the company without the bank's written consent. I respectfully agree. Elsewhere in his judgment he appears to have assumed that the account into which the proceeds of the book debts were to be paid under the debenture in the Siebe Gorman case [1979] 2 Lloyd's Rep 142 was also a blocked account: p 727, para 38; p 730, para 48. In para 38 he said that the company could collect the money but was not free to use it as it saw fit. The question whether he was right when he made that assumption is at the heart of this case.

[...]

62. Lord Phillips of Worth Matravers MR said that, even if Slade J's construction of the debenture in Siebe Gorman & Co Ltd v Barclays Bank Ltd [1979] 2 Lloyd's Rep 142 had appeared to him to be erroneous, he would have been inclined to hold that the form of the debenture had, by custom and usage, acquired the meaning and effect that he had attributed to it: [2004] Ch 337, 383, para 97. This was because the form had been used for 25 years under the understanding that this was its meaning and effect. Banks had relied upon this understanding, and individuals had guaranteed the liabilities of companies to banks on the understanding that the banks would be entitled to look first to their charges on book debts unaffected by the claims of preferred creditors. The respondents say that this is the course that ought now to be followed in the interests of commercial certainty.

63. The House's Practice Statement of 26 July 1966 reminds us that the use of precedent is an indispensable foundation on which to decide what is the law and how it should be applied in individual cases: Practice Statement (Judicial Precedent) [1966] 1 WLR 1234. It promotes the degree of certainty that is needed for the guidance of those who must regulate their affairs according to the law. It is hard to think of an area of the law where the need for certainty is more important than that with which your Lordships are concerned in this case. The commercial life of this country depends to a large extent on the reliability of the security arrangements that are entered into between debtors and their creditors. The law provides the context in which these arrangements are entered into, and it lays down the rules that have to be applied when the arrangements break down. Mistakes as to the law can make all the difference between success and failure when the creditor seeks to realise his security. So a heavy responsibility lies on judges to provide the lending market with guidance that is accurate and reliable. This is so that mistakes can be avoided and transactions entered into with confidence that they will achieve what is expected of them.

64. These are powerful considerations, but I am in no doubt that the proper course is for the Siebe Gorman decision to be overruled. It is a tribute to the great respect which Slade LJ's outstandingly careful judgments, both at first instance and the Court of Appeal, have always commanded that his decision in that case has remained unchallenged for so many years. But the fact is that it was a decision that was taken at first instance, and it has now been conclusively demonstrated that the construction which he placed on the debenture was wrong. This is not one of those cases where there are respectable arguments either way. With regret, the conclusion has to be that it is not possible to defend the decision on any rational basis. It is not enough to say that it has stood for more than 25 years. The fact is that, like any other first instance decision, it was always open to correction if the country's highest appellate court was persuaded that there was something wrong with it. Those who relied upon it must be taken to have been aware of this. It provided guidance, and no criticism can reasonably be levelled at those who felt that it was proper to rely on it. But it was no more immune from review by the ultimate appellate court than any other decision which has been taken at first instance.

Lord Scott gave a concurring opinion and said the following.

107. Indeed if a security has Romer LJ's third characteristic I am inclined to think that it qualifies as a floating charge, and cannot be a fixed charge, whatever may be its other characteristics. Suppose, for example, a case where an express assignment of a specific debt by way of security were accompanied by a provision that reserved to the assignor the right, terminable by written notice from the assignee, to collect the debt and to use the proceeds for its (the assignor's) business purposes, ie, a right, terminable on notice, for the assignor to withdraw the proceeds of the debt from the security. This security would, in my opinion, be a floating security notwithstanding the express assignment. The assigned debt would be specific and ascertained but its status as a security would not. Unless and until the right of the assignor to collect and deal with the proceeds were terminated, the security would retain its floating characteristic. Or suppose a case in which the charge were expressed to come into existence on the future occurrence of some event and then to be a fixed charge over whatever assets of a specified description the chargor might own at that time. The contractual rights thereby granted would, in my opinion, be properly categorised as a floating security. There can, in my opinion, be no difference in categorisation between the grant of a fixed charge expressed to come into existence on a future event in relation to a specified class of assets owned by the chargor at that time and the grant of a floating charge over the specified class of assets with cystallisation taking place on the occurrence of that event. I endeavoured to make this point in In re Cosslett (Contractors) Ltd [2002] 1 AC 336, 357, para 63. Nor, in principle, can there be any difference in categorisation between those grants and the grant of a charge over the specified assets expressed to be a fixed charge but where the chargor is permitted until the occurrence of the specified event to remove the charged assets from the security. In all these cases, and in any other case in which the chargor remains free to remove the charged assets from the security, the charge should, in principle, be categorised as a floating charge. The assets would have the circulating, ambulatory character distinctive of a floating charge.

[...]

111. In my opinion, the essential characteristic of a floating charge, the characteristic that distinguishes it from a fixed charge, is that the asset subject to the charge is not finally appropriated as a security for the payment of the debt until the occurrence of some future event. In the meantime the chargor is left free to use the charged asset and to remove it from the security. On this point I am in respectful agreement with Lord Millett. Moreover, recognition that this is the essential characteristic of a floating charge reflects the mischief that the statutory intervention to which I have referred was intended to meet and should ensure that preferential creditors continue to enjoy the priority that section 175 of the 1986 Act and its statutory predecessors intended them to have.

=== Prospective rulings ===
Regarding the prospective ruling issue, Lord Nicholls said that judges had been described as "developing" the law for some time when making novel decisions, and that a judge is not free to repeal laws or distance themselves from bad laws; their only power is to impose a new interpretation. He also noted the new "dynamic" power to interpret statutes under section 3 of the Human Rights Act 1998. He then went on to rule:

But, even in respect of statute law, they do not lead to the conclusion that prospective overruling can never be justified as a proper exercise of judicial power. In this country the established practice of judicial precedent derives from the common law. Constitutionally the judges have power to modify this practice.

He held that in exceptional cases, it would be open to the court to hold that a new interpretation of the law should be applied only prospectively. However, on the facts of the case before him, Lord Hope felt that it was "miles away from the exceptional category in which alone prospective overruling would be legitimate" (para 43) and so relegated his comments upon prospective only rulings to obiter dictum. However, given the strength and number of the court, and that the court specifically invited the Attorney General to appoint leading counsel to address them on that point, it seems clear that the decision on that point will be treated as binding precedent.

== Significance ==
In relation to the substantive issues, the Revenue had already indicated that it would not seek to reopen recent liquidations that had been distributed in compliance with the understandings of the old law so in many senses, the ruling took prospective effect only with respect to the largest preferred creditor. The drafting of security documents has also been modified by the legal profession, and debentures now usually contain provisions stating that the proceeds of book debts may not be assigned and must be paid into a blocked account.

Prior to the decision, "prospective only" rulings were not favoured under English law. In Launchbury v Morgans [1973] AC 127 (at 137), Lord Wilberforce had expressed that view that "We cannot, without yet further innovation, change the law prospectively only". More recently, in Kleinwort Benson Ltd v Lincoln City Council [1999] 2 AC 349 (at 379), Lord Goff of Chieveley had said the system of prospective overruling "has no place in our legal system".

== See also ==
On company law

- Floating charge
- Voidable floating charge

On constitutional law

- Precedent
- Stare decisis
- Bush v. Gore, where the US Supreme Court decided its decision was effective for the 2000 Republican victory, but not necessarily otherwise.
