= Re New Bullas Trading Ltd =

UK insolvency law case

- Court: Court of Appeal
- Citation: [1994] 1 BCLC 485

Case opinions
- Nourse LJ

Keywords
- Floating charge

Re New Bullas Trading Ltd [1994] 1 BCLC 485 is a UK insolvency law case, concerning the definition of a floating charge. It held, somewhat controversially, that it was possible to separate a book debt from its proceeds, and that it was possible to create a fixed charge over the book debt but only a floating charge over the proceeds. At the time the decision attracted a great deal of academic commentary, much of it hostile.

It is now outdated as authority, being first doubted by the Privy Council in Re Brumark Investments Ltd [2001] UKPC 28, and then formally overruled by the House of Lords in Re Spectrum Plus Ltd [2005] UKHL 41.

== Facts ==
New Bullas Trading Ltd granted a charge over book debts in favour of 3i plc. It said this was a fixed charge over the uncollected debts and a floating charge over their proceeds, which went into a designated bank account (or another one that 3i could specify in writing).

Knox J held this was impossible. He said there was a floating charge throughout, so the company’s preferential creditors were entitled in an administrative receivership to priority under Insolvency Act 1986 s 40 with regard to uncollected debts.

== Judgment ==
Nourse LJ overturned the decision. He held that a charge may be divisible, and the parties had unequivocally expressed their intention and ‘unless there is some authority or principle of law which prevented them from agreeing what they have agreed, their agreement must prevail’. In essence, he held that the wording did allow them to have such a form of security, the parties were free to make such arrangements. He said unless, unlawful, the free will of the parties would prevail.

== Authority ==
Although the case remained good law for many years, it was doubted by Lord Millett sitting in the Privy Council in Re Brumark Investments Ltd [2001] UKPC 28, before finally being formally overruled by a seven-member House of Lords in Re Spectrum Plus Ltd [2005] UKHL 41.

== See also ==
- UK company law
- Floating charge
- Voidable floating charge
