= Siebe Gorman & Co Ltd v Barclays Bank Ltd =

UK insolvency law case

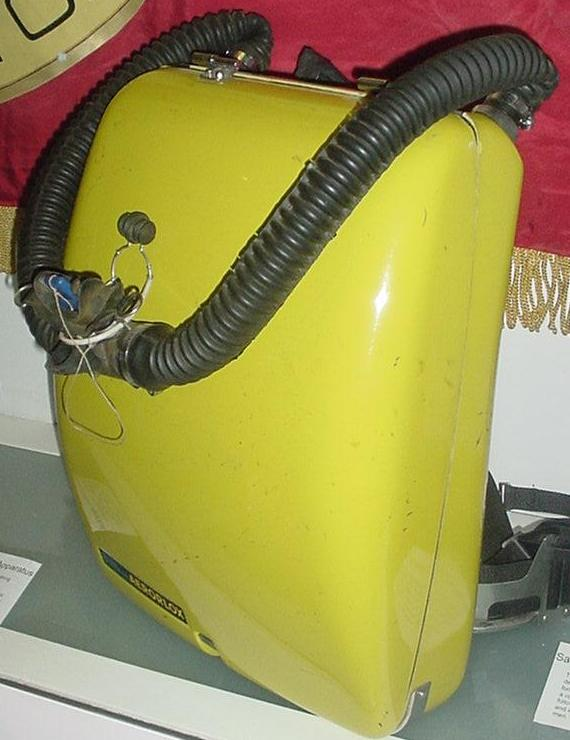
- A Siebe Gorman rebreather.
- Court: High Court of Justice
- Citation: [1979] 2 Lloyd’s Rep 142

Court membership
- Judge sitting: Slade J

Keywords
- Floating charge

Siebe Gorman & Co Ltd v Barclays Bank Ltd [1979] 2 Lloyd's Rep 142 is a UK insolvency law case, concerning the definition of a floating charge. It was an influential decision for many years, but is now outdated as authority in light of the House of Lords decision in Re Spectrum Plus Ltd.

== Facts ==
Siebe Gorman, a diving equipment company, granted a debenture in favour of Barclays Bank to secure a loan. The document was expressed to create a ‘first fixed charge’ over all present and future book debts. It required Siebe Gorman to pay the proceeds of its book debts into a Barclays Bank account, and prohibited Siebe Gorman from creating any other charges on those book debts, or assigning the book debts to anyone else. So there was a prohibition on dealing with the book debts before collection of them. Barclays also had the right to obtain absolute control by giving notice, but that right was never exercised.

== Judgment ==
Slade J held that it was a fixed charge. The restrictions on Siebe Gorman's power gave the bank enough control to be inconsistent with being a floating charge.

== Authority ==
Although the case remained good law for many years, it was doubted by the Privy Council in Re Brumark Investments Ltd [2001] UKPC 28, and then formally overruled by the House of Lords in Re Spectrum Plus Ltd [2005] UKHL 41.

== See also ==
- UK company law
- Floating charge
- Voidable floating charge
