= Borden (UK) Ltd v Scottish Timber Products Ltd =

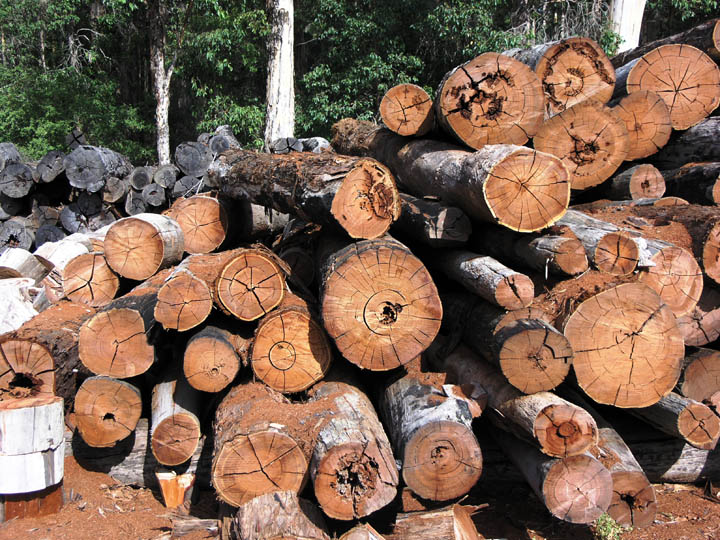
- Court: Court of Appeal
- Full case name: Borden (UK) Ltd v Scottish Timber Products Ltd
- Decided: 10 July 1979
- Citations: [1981] Ch 25 [1979] 3 WLR 672 [1979] 3 All ER 961 [1980] 1 Lloyd's Rep 160 (1979) 123 SJ 688

Case history
- Appealed from: [1979] 2 Lloyd's Rep 168

Court membership
- Judges sitting: Buckley LJ; Templeman LJ; Bridge LJ

Keywords
- Title retention clause; tracing

Borden (UK) Ltd v Scottish Timber Products Ltd [1981] Ch 25 is a judicial decision of the Court of Appeal of England and Wales relating to retention of title clauses, and the extent to which the vendor of raw material can seek to assert title to good into which those raw materials are subsequently worked. The court held that when the relevant raw material was worked into another product it ceased to exist as a separate type of property, and accordingly it was no longer possible for a seller to retain title to it.

== Facts ==
Borden (UK) Ltd were manufacturers of chipboard resin. They were the main suppliers of that product to the company, Scottish Timber Products Ltd, who used it to manufacture chipboard. The resin was sold on credit terms. Those terms included a retention of title clause. The company could store approximately two days' worth of resin on their premises. As part of the manufacturing process, the resin was mixed with hardeners and wax emulsion. This process created what was referred to as "glue mix" and was irreversible.

On 16 September 1977 the company went into receivership, and then subsequently into insolvent liquidation. Borden sought declarations from the court that they could trace their title to the resin under the retention of title clauses into the glue mix and the worked products.

== Decision ==
The main decision of the court was delivered by Bridge LJ.

He considered carefully the earlier decision of Aluminium Industrie Vaassen BV v Romalpa Aluminium Ltd [1976] 1 WLR 676 in relation to retention of title, and the decision in Re Hallett's Estate (1880) 13 Ch D 696 in relation to the right to trace.

He held that the process of working the resin destroyed that product, and the title of any person which was vested in it. Accordingly, the title which was retained under the agreement was extinguished. He went on to elaborate:

The lesson to be learned from these conclusions is a simple one. If the seller of goods to a manufacturer, who knows that his goods are to be used in the manufacturing process before they are paid for wishes to reserve to himself an effective security for the payment of the price, he cannot rely on a simple reservation of title clause such as that relied upon by the plaintiffs. If he wishes to acquire rights over the finished product, he can only do so by express contractual stipulation.

Buckley LJ and Templeman LJ gave short concurring judgments. They added in their judgment that acquiring title in the worked product would generally result in the interest being treated as an equitable charge, which would be void if not properly registered under the Companies Act 1948 (now the Companies Act 2006).

== Authority ==
The case is still accepted as authoritative today.
