= Re Brightlife Ltd =

- Court: High Court
- Citation: [1987] Ch 200

Court membership
- Judge sitting: Hoffmann J

Keywords
- Insolvency; Floating charge; Recharacterisation

Re Brightlife Ltd [1987] 1 Ch 200 is a UK insolvency law case, concerning the conversion of a floating charge into a fixed charge ("crystallisation"). It held that an automatic crystallisation clause was part of the parties’ freedom of contract. It could not be limited by court created public policy exceptions. The significance of the case was largely outpaced by the Insolvency Act 1986 section 251, which said a floating charge was one that was created as a floating charge.

== Facts ==
Brightlife Ltd had a charge over book debts in favour of Norandex, its bank. The charge said it was a "first specific charge" and did not allow Brightlife to sell, factor or discount debts without written consent. A debenture holder gave the company a notice converting the floating charge into a fixed charge a week before a voluntary winding up resolution was passed. Counsel argued public policy required restriction on crystallising events, one reason being that an automatic crystallisation clause could take effect without knowledge of company or debenture holder. It could be prejudicial to a third party, because it does not get registered. Counsel referred to the Canadian case R v Consolidated Churchill Copper Corp Ltd, where Berger J rejected the concept of a "self generating crystallisation".

== Judgment ==
Hoffmann J held that in reality, the charge on book debts was a floating charge, but had crystallised a week before, and so took priority over other debts. Following Re Manurewa Transport Ltd crystallisation clauses were a necessary incident of parties’ freedom to contract and policy objections should be dealt with by Parliament. He noted various statutory already, including priority to preferential debts. And certainly he at first instance was not going to add to the list. It followed that there was a floating charge if a company can continue to use book debts without the consent of the chargee. He added that although clause 3(A)(ii)(a) referred to a ‘first specific charge’ over book debts and others, ‘the rights over the debts created by the debenture were in my judgment such as to be categorised in law as a floating charge.'

[The...] ‘significant feature is that Brightlife was free to collect its debts and pay the proceeds into its bank account. Once in the account, they would be outside the charge over debts and at the free disposal of the company. In my judgment a right to deal in this way with the charged assets for its own account is a badge of a floating charge and is inconsistent with a fixed charge.

[...]

I do not think that it is open to the courts to restrict the contractual freedom of parties to a floating charge on such grounds. The floating charge was invented by Victorian lawyers to enable manufacturing and trading companies to raise loan capital on debentures… without inhibiting its ability to trade.

[...]

The public interest requires a balancing of the advantages to the economy of facilitating the borrowing of money against the possibility of injustice to unsecured creditors… arguments for and against the floating charge are matters for Parliament rather than the courts.

== Authority ==
The case was cited by the House of Lords with approval by Lord Scott in Re Spectrum Plus Ltd [2005] UKHL 41 (at paragraph 87) in relation to the recharacterisation of a charge described as a fixed charge over book debts as a floating charge.

== See also ==
- UK insolvency law
