= Illingworth v Houldsworth =

- Court: House of Lords
- Full case name: Houldsworth and Another v The Yorkshire Woolcombers' Association, Limited, and Illingworth
- Citation: [1904] AC 355
- Transcript

Case history
- Prior action: [1903] 2 Ch 284, known in the Court of Appeal as Re Yorkshire Woolcombers Association

Court membership
- Judges sitting: Lord Halsbury LC, Lord Macnaghten, Lord James of Hereford, Lord Lindley

Keywords
- Security interest; priority; floating charge

Illingworth v Houldsworth [1904] AC 355 (known as or Re Yorkshire Woolcombers Association in the Court of Appeal) is a UK insolvency law case, concerning the taking of a security interest over a company's assets with a floating charge. In the Court of Appeal Romer LJ held that a key to a floating charge, as opposed to a fixed charge was that the company can carry on its business with assets subject to the charge.

The case is fairly unusual in English law in that is more frequently cited for the Court of Appeal's decision than for the subsequent decision of the House of Lords. This is principally because of the attempt by Romer LJ to describe or define the core characteristics of a floating charge. Despite stating explicitly: "I certainly do not intend to attempt to give an exact definition of the term 'floating charge,'" his description has been almost universally accepted and endorsed. The three core characteristics which he identified were:

1. the charge is on a class of assets of a company, present and future;
2. that class is one which, in the ordinary course of the business of the company, would be changing from time to time; and
3. until some future step is taken by or on behalf of the chargee, the company may carry on its business in the ordinary way and deal with the assets within the particular class of assets.

== Facts ==
The Yorkshire Woolcombers Association Ltd had borrowed money from various guarantors, and in a trust deed of 23 April 1900, it said it was giving a floating charge to the guarantors to secure the money. Further guarantees were given to the guarantor's bank, the Bradford District Bank Ltd, and the guarantors were pressing for repayment. With debts still outstanding, the Association organised a further deal on 25 October 1902. Mr Frederick Illingworth, on behalf of the guarantors, agreed with the Association to have a charge over the company's book debts. It called this an "indemnity and specific security", and said that being assigned were “all and singular the book and other debts now owing to the association, and also all and singular the book and other debts which may at any time during the continuance of this security become owing to the association (but not including uncalled capital of the association), and the full benefit of all the securities for the said present and future book and other debts”. On 21 November 1902, Mr Illingworth appointed a receiver to call in the book debts (a large sum, amounting to £71,000). Receivers of the other creditors were quickly appointed on 25 November, and contended that the deed from 25 October 1902 was void, because it was not registered, as floating charges were meant to be, under the Companies Act 1900 section 14(1) (now Companies Act 2006, section 860).

== Judgment ==
=== Court of Appeal ===
The Court of Appeal held that the charge in question was floating, and so was void because it was not registered. Vaughan Williams LJ gave the first judgment. Romer LJ said a charge is "floating" if it (1) is a charge on present and future assets (2) the class of assets changes in the ordinary course of business, and (3) the company can deal with the assets in business as usual.

The term “floating” is one that until recently was a mere popular term. It certainly had no distinct legal meaning. It is not a legal term. It has recently been used in more than one statute; but when the Courts have to consider whether the charge is a floating one within the meaning of the term as used in the Acts of Parliament, and in particular within the meaning of the Companies Act, 1900, one must, I think, deal with the question of substance to be answered according to the circumstance of each particular case. I certainly do not intend to attempt to give an exact definition of the term “floating charge,” nor am I prepared to say that there will not be a floating charge within the meaning of the Act, which does not contain all the three characteristics that I am about to mention, but I certainly think that if a charge has the three characteristics that I am about to mention it is a floating charge. (1.) If it is a charge on a class of assets of a company present and future; (2.) if that class is one which, in the ordinary course of the business of the company, would be changing from time to time; and (3.) if you find that by the charge it is contemplated that, until some future step is taken by or on behalf of those interested in the charge, the company may carry on its business in the ordinary way as far as concerns the particular class of assets I am dealing with.

=== House of Lords ===
The House of Lords affirmed Romer LJ's decision. Lord Halsbury LC held the following.

In the first place you have that which in a sense I suppose must be an element in the definition of a floating security, that it is something which is to float, not to be put into immediate operation, but such that the company is to be allowed to carry on its business. It contemplates not only that it should carry with it the book debts which were then existing but it contemplates also the possibility of those book debts being extinguished by a payment to the company, and that other book debts should come in and take the place of those that had disappeared.

Lord MacNaghten agreed.

I should have thought there was not much difficulty in defining what a floating charge is in contrast to what is called a specific charge. A specific charge, I think, is one that without more fastens on ascertained and definite property or property capable of being ascertained and defined; a floating charge, on the other hand, is ambulatory and shifting in its nature, hovering over and so to speak floating with the property which it is intended to affect until some event occurs or some act is done which causes it to settle and fasten on the subject of the charge within its reach and grasp.

The tenor of Lord Macnaghten's judgment was significantly softer than the comments he made in relation to floating charges seven years earlier in Salomon v A Salomon & Co Ltd [1896] UKHL 1, [1897] AC 22. In that case he stated: "Everybody knows that when there is a winding-up debenture-holders generally step in and sweep off everything; and a great scandal it is."

Lord James and Lord Lindley concurred.

== See also ==
- UK insolvency law
- Royal Trust Bank v National Westminster Bank plc [1996] BCC 613, Millett LJ, overturning Jonathan Parker J [1995] BCC 128 held the expression that a charge is ‘fixed’ or ‘floating’ in a contract is not conclusive. Substance prevails over form.
