= George Markham Giffard =

English barrister and judge (1813–1870)

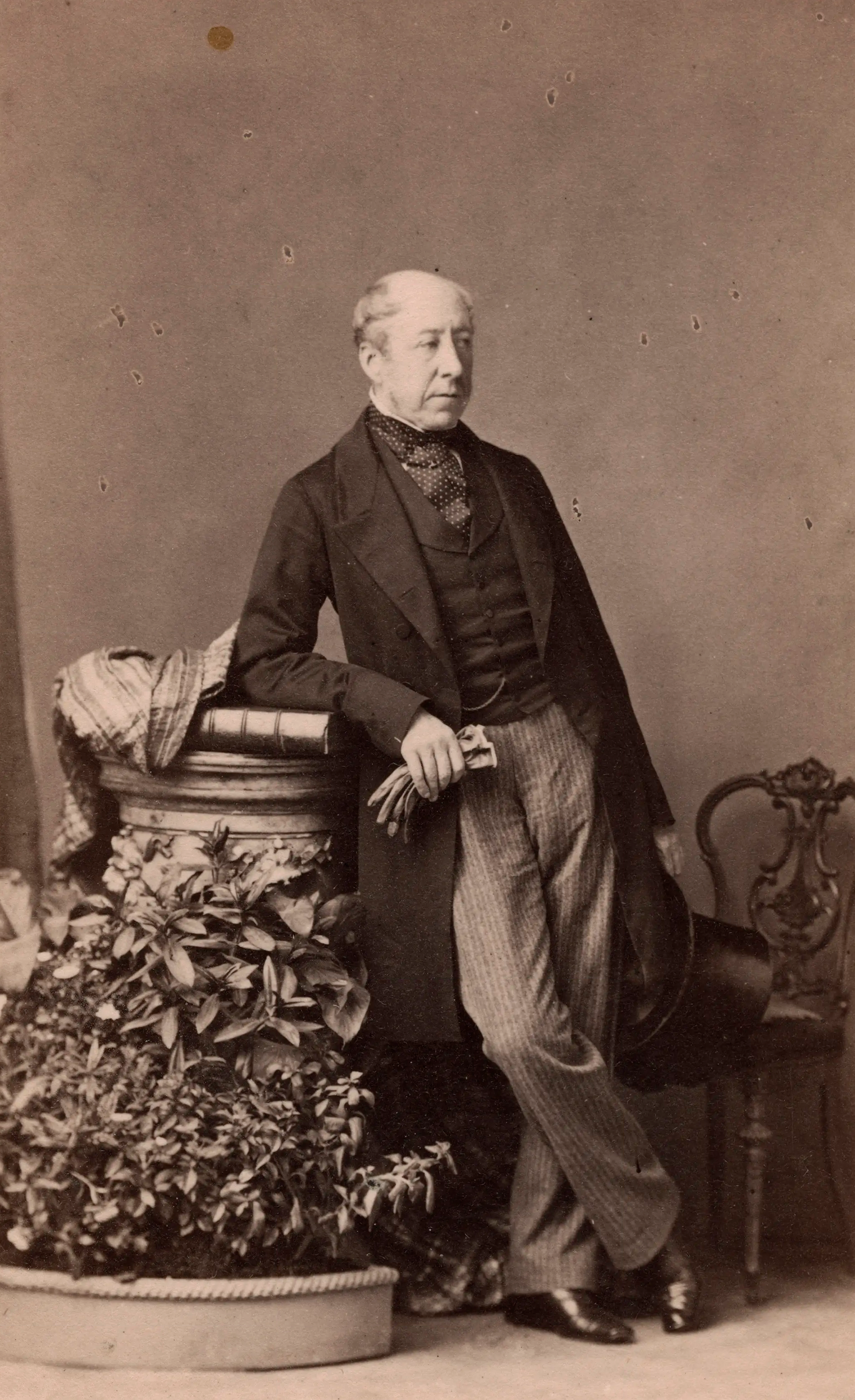
Photograph by Disdéri, 1860s

Sir George Markham Giffard, PC (4 November 1813 – 13 July 1870) was an English barrister and judge.

== Life ==
The fourth son of Admiral John Giffard and Susannah, daughter of Sir John Carter, he was born at his father's official residence in Portsmouth dockyard on 4 November 1813. He was educated at Winchester College and at New College, Oxford, where he was elected to a fellowship in 1832 and took the degree of BCL on 4 March 1841.

While studying at Oxford, he played first-class cricket for Oxford University on four occasions between 1834 and 1836. He scored 128 runs in these matches, with a highest score of 105 against MCC at Lord's in 1835.

As a bowler he took 7 wickets, on one occasion taking a five wicket haul.

Giffard entered the Inner Temple, of which he eventually became a bencher, and was called to the bar in November 1840. He obtained an equity practice and was a leading chancery junior counsel. In 1859, he became a Queen's Counsel and attached himself to the court of Vice-chancellor Sir William Page Wood - the same year he was part of the defence team for Thomas Smethurst in his murder trial.

When Vice-Chancellor Wood in March 1868 became a Lord Justice of Appeal, Giffard succeeded him and was again his successor on his promotion from the Court of Appeal as Lord Chancellor, when he also became a member of the Privy Council. After an extended illness, he died at his house, 4 Prince's Gardens, Hyde Park, London. In 1853, he married Maria, second daughter of Charles Pilgrim of Kingsfield, Southampton.

As a barrister, he appeared in numerous cases, including the successful respondents in Liverpool Marine Credit Co v Hunter (1868) 3 LR Ch App 479.

As a judge, Giffard handed down the decision in In re Panama, New Zealand, and Australian Royal Mail Co (1870) 5 Ch App 318, generally regarded as the first case in English law to recognise the floating charge. He also gave the judgment in Munns v Isle of Wight Railway Company (1870) 5 Ch App 414 in relation to the appointment of a receiver in favour of the holder of an equitable lien.

== Arms ==
Coat of arms of George Markham Giffard

Crest
Issuant from a ducal coronet Or an arm couped at the elbow vested Or charged with two bars wavy Azure cuffed Argent holding in the hand Proper a buck's head cabossed Or.
Escutcheon
Gules three lions passant in pale Or.

== Notes ==
Attribution

This article incorporates text from a publication now in the public domain: Stephen, Leslie, ed. (1890). "Giffard, George Markham". Dictionary of National Biography. Vol. 21. London: Smith, Elder & Co.
