= Prudential Assurance Co Ltd v London Residuary Body =

1991 English land law case

- Court: Judicial Committee of the House of Lords
- Full case name: Prudential Assurance Co Ltd v London Residuary Body and others
- Decided: 16 July 1992
- Citations: [1991] UKHL 10 [1992] 2 AC 386 [1992] 3 All ER 504 [1992] 3 WLR 279

Case history
- Prior action: Appellant won at first instance (order restored). Appellant lost in the Court of Appeal (order reversed).

Case opinions
- Held: a lease must be limited to expire by the effluxion of time (i.e. have either a fixed end date or a certain-to-occur absolute longstop event/date such as being for a person's life). The expressed lease "until the strip of land is needed for road-widening" is not a valid lease in law.

Keywords
- Lease; certainty of duration; invalidity of lease; until...required "lease"; creation of ransom strip

Prudential Assurance Co Ltd v London Residuary Body [1991] UKHL 10 is an English land law case, confirming and explaining the requirements of certainty of duration of any lease.

== Facts ==
Mr Nathan owned 263-265 Walworth Rd, Southwark, London before 1930, and the London County Council the road. It planned to widen it, encroaching on a strip of land separating his shop from the road. The LCC bought the freehold of the strip, but agreed he could use it until the project went ahead, and he would pay £30 a year in rent ‘until the strip of land is needed for road-widening’. But by 1988 the road had not been widened and the London Residuary Body (LRB), successor of the LCC held it. Prudential Assurance Ltd now held numbers 263-265.

LRB pleaded that it could end Prudential's right to use its strip (whereby Prudential paid £30 a year); arguing either the lease it granted in 1930 was invalid or that if the court were to uphold some novel form of limitless tenancy it should be deemed capable of ending (termination) on a year's notice either way.

Prudential plead it had a valid limitless tenancy/lease and strictly (outside of say compulsory purchase for wider development) the LRB could only get possession if needed to widen the road. Prudential pointed to the estimated loss/gain of trade from its units £10,000 a year if customers could not cross it. This was the amount of money which LRB might be able to charge it so as to continue to operate its adjoining shop, having a ransom strip if the lease was found to be completely void. Prudential stressed if Nathan had known he would need to pay a market rate access charge to continue to enjoy the pavement/front yard he would never had sold it to the local authority. Prudential begged the court to amend the common law rules rather than rely on the possibility the Law Commission may one day amend it to deal with this unsatisfactory outcome (the voidness of leases not expiring by the effluxion of time).

Millett J found in favour of Prudential. LRB used the leapfrog procedure to go directly to the House of Lords, as it wished to challenge the Court of Appeal cases, In re Midland Railway Co’s Agreement and Ashburn Anstalt v Arnold.

== Judgment ==
The Court, unanimously, led by Lord Templeman held the tenancy was too uncertain to be effective, and thus had not created a binding lease.

Lord Browne-Wilkinson agreed but noted that any successor in title for Mr Nathan would no longer automatically have land that faced the road, which is of commercial importance on such a main road. Nothing could be more unsatisfactory. The Law Commission should look to amend the law. Lord Mustill agreed with Lord Browne-Wilkinson completely.

The bizarre outcome results from the application of an ancient and technical rule of law which requires the maximum duration of a term of years to be ascertainable from the outset. No one has produced any satisfactory rationale for the genesis of this rule. No one has been able to point to any useful purpose that it serves at the present day. If, by overruling the existing authorities, this House were able to change the law for the future only I would have urged your Lordships to do so.

== Cases applied ==
Lace v Chantler [1944] KB 368, EWCA

== Applied in ==
Mexfield Housing Co-operative Ltd v Berrisford [2011] UKSC 52

== See also ==
- English land law
- English property law
