= Parrot Corporation =

British floppy diskette manufacturer

Parrot Corporation Limited
- Type: Private
- Industry: Computer storage
- Founded: 1983
- Defunct: 1989
- Fate: Dissolved
- Headquarters: Cwmbran, Wales
- Products: Floppy Diskettes
- Number of employees: 180

Parrot Corporation Limited was a British floppy diskette manufacturer formed in 1983, that operated from Llantarnam Industrial Park in Cwmbran, south Wales. The company was a start-up venture funded by the Welsh Development Agency (WDA).

The company suffered financial difficulties in 1985, a company investigation uncovered fraud, culminating in the dismissal of company director Frank E. Peters. A British political controversy ensued, with its focus upon the fraud and the WDA's investment practices. Peters was extradited to Britain to face a criminal trial, but was acquitted of all charges. The company became bankrupt due to financial and market pressures, and its assets were later sold for £1.25 million. Peters was subject to a United States court case in 2007; the charges included conspiracy, fraudulently inflating the value of security to a bank, bank fraud, mail fraud and wire fraud.

== History ==
Parrot Corporation was set up in 1983 as the only British based fully integrated manufacturer of floppy diskettes for personal computers, a start-up venture funded partly by the WDA. The company manufactured 8", 5 1/4" and 3 1/2" floppy diskettes and provided duplication services and technical support to technology transfer companies. The WDA approached an American citizen, Frank E. Peters to set up the company, his role was to provide expertise in setting up the manufacturing plant and oversee the production facilities. Peters was an investor in the company along with the WDA who contributed £1.5 million, with a further £2.5 million in the form of a loan from the European Coal and Steel Community (ECSC), an organisation serving to unify the industry of Western Europe and created the foundation for the modern-day European Union. The ECSC would provide the loan on condition of a loan guarantee, this guarantee was provided by the Northern Trust Bank, Chicago in the United States. Additional investors were arranged by the WDA for the purpose of purchasing equipment and to provide working capital for the company.

== Financial irregularities ==
Financial problems were experienced in 1985 due to the decline in the market price for diskettes, the poor performance of the pound against the dollar, the increasing costs of equipment, the delay in the construction of the Cwmbran factory and late funding by the WDA. An internal investigation carried out by the company secretary discovered that £2 million of the ECSC loan was missing from the Parrot accounts. Due to this irregularity, Peters was fired by the company and subsequently arrested and questioned by the British police regarding the missing funds. The £2 million of the ECSC loan was actually deposited in the Northern Trust Bank as collateral for the loan guarantee, a fact unknown to the WDA and the company investors.

Peters was released without charge and returned to the United States, in 1989 he would be extradited to Britain to face six criminal charges. He was acquitted in 1991 after a jury trial in the Crown Court at Cardiff, Wales.

== Political controversy ==
The financial difficulties of the Parrot Corporation were scrutinised by the British Parliament and the subject of much discussion. The WDA was criticised for its involvement and perceived to have poorly invested public funds in a "murky transaction". The Secretary of State for Wales was criticised for failing to ensure proper financial controls were in place within the WDA. The police investigation, which involved officers attending the offices of Northern Trust Bank in Chicago, was criticised due to its cost, as were the costs of defending a claim against the company by Peters in the United States.

The WDA was criticised for obtaining an injunction against the BBC to prevent the publication of Peters' allegations against the company and for its perceived lack of accountability to the public. The internal policies of the WDA were of concern, particularly the subsequent employment of the WDA's investment officer by the Parrot Corporation, who was instrumental in the companies' formation and funding. Changes were made by the Secretary of State for Wales to the WDA's employment policies to prevent future conflicts of interest.

== Bankruptcy ==
The company suffered trading losses year on year from its inception to 1986 and its directors were confident that the commissioning of a new 3 1/2" diskette manufacturing line in early 1989 would provide an opportunity to produce profit. The line did not start production until late 1989 and due to these delays and the collapse of diskette prices during this period, they suffered additional financial losses. The company failed to recover its costs from the new 3 1/2" diskette production facility and attempts to find a buyer for the company were not successful. The company entered receivership on the 16 May 1989, with the loss of 180 jobs. The assets of the company and its trading name were sold for £1.25 million on 20 July 1989 to Arma BV.

The 60,000 sq ft (5,600 m^{2}) factory that housed the company, now known as Brecon House, William Brown Close, Llantarnam Industrial Park, was later used by LG Electronics Wales as their training facility for their new manufacturing plant in Newport.

== Later events ==
On 1 August 2007, Frank E. Peters was convicted after a jury trial of six charges in Buffalo, New York in the United States. The charges included conspiracy, fraudulently inflating the value of security to a bank, bank fraud, mail fraud and wire fraud. Peters was the President of World Auto Parts, a company located in Buffalo in the late 1990s and in 2000. The company had a $10,500,000 revolving line of credit with the Chase Manhattan Bank, which was secured against the assets of the company. Peters was convicted of conspiring and causing false reports to go to the bank about the value of the security and hiding from the bank the true (and dire) state of financial affairs of the company. Peters was also convicted by the jury for his role in a scheme to divert valuable assets from the bank, which involved returning cheques payable to World Auto Parts to customers, asking that these cheques be redrafted to ITEC, a company that Peters had formed without the Chase Manhattan Bank's knowledge.

Peters' bail was revoked in January 2010 after his electronic monitor fell off his ankle after breaking into pieces. The U.S. District Judge, William M. Skretny, did not accept Peters' explanation and revoked his bail. Peters will be confined to a jail cell until his sentencing, which was set for 16 June 2010.

Peters was sentenced to 108 months (9 years) in jail by Judge William M. Skretny on 27 January 2011. Peters was also ordered to pay restitution of over $11,000,000 to Chase Bank and forfeit over $23,000,000.

== See also ==
- Welsh Development Agency v Export Finance Co Ltd, relating to the collapse of the Parrot Corporation.
