= Holroyd v Marshall =

- Court: House of Lords
- Full case name: Holroyd and Others v J.G. Marshall and Others
- Decided: 4 August 1862
- Citations: (1862) 10 HLC 191; 11 ER 999

Case opinions
- Lord Westbury LC, Lord Wensleydale, Lord Chelmsford

Keywords
- Security interest; Priority

Holroyd v Marshall (1862) 10 HLC 191, 11 ER 999 was a judicial decision of the House of Lords. In that case the House of Lords affirmed that under English law a person could grant a mortgage or other security interest over future property, i.e. property that they did not actually own at the time of granting the charge. Prior to decision, the generally accepted principle under English law was that pursuant to the nemo dat rule it was impossible for a person to convey a security interest in property which they did not own at the time of granting the charge.

The case is also notable in that no less than three persons who were, or one day would be, Lord Chancellor, gave judgments. It is also a rare example of one Law Lord interrupting another during their speech to object to a point in their judgment.

== Background ==
The case was decided against the backdrop of the industrial revolution in Victorian England. With the expansion of industry, companies were hungry for capital, and commercial parties were exploring new ways for these companies to raise debt finance by way of debentures. As part of that process debenture holders were seeking greater protection for themselves to protect the capital which they invested in these new ventures to ensure that, if the company failed, that they had a prior claim the company's assets over any competing creditors.

== Facts ==
The underlying borrower was a businessman named James Taylor, who was engaged as a damask manufacturer at Hayes Mill, Ovenden, near Halifax, Yorkshire. The case reports that "[i]n 1858 he became embarrassed, [and] a sale of his effects by auction took place". The Holroyds purchased all of his machinery. They subsequently sold it back to him, but because he could not pay for it, the purchase price was left outstanding and a security interest was granted over the machinery. However, the indenture granting the security interest not only referred to the existing machinery, but separately to:

"... all machinery, implements, and things which, during the continuance of this security, shall be fixed or placed in or about the said mill, buildings, and appurtenances, in addition to or in substitution for the said premises, or any part thereof ..."

The indenture was duly registered under the Bills of Sale Act 1854 (17 & 18 Vict, c. 36).

As time passed Taylor sold and replaced some of the machinery, and bought some new machinery.

On 13 April 1860 one Emil Preller sued Taylor, and Mr Garth Marshall, the high sheriff of York, executed a writ of scire facias against Taylor and machinery was seized in appropriation of the claims.

On 30 May 1860 the Holroyds filed a bill for relief claiming that they had superior title. The case came initially before the Vice Chancellor, who found in favour of the Holroyds. The judgment creditors then appealed, and the case came before Lord Campbell LC, who reversed the decision. He held:

"My judgment rests upon Lord Bacon's maxim, 'Licet dispositio de interesse future sit inutilis, tam fieri potest declaratio præcedens quoe sortiatur effectum, interveniente novo actu.' Before any subsequent act is done, the assignment gives an equitable interest as between assignee and assignor; but a legal interest subsequently, bona fide acquired before possession taken by the equitable assignee shall prevail.

The Holroyds then appealed to the House of Lords.

== Decision ==
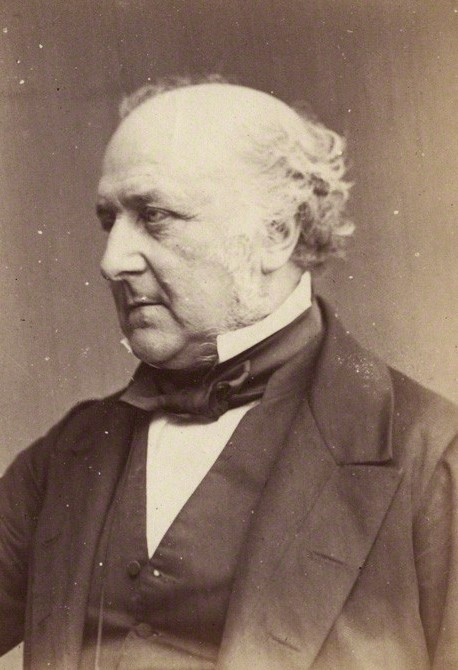
Lord Westbury LC.

Lord Westbury LC, Lord Wensleydale and Lord Chelmsford each gave judgments.

Lord Westbury started by noting that the respondents had conceded that if the mortgagees (the Holroyds) had an equitable interest in the added machinery then it could not be seized by them as judgment creditors. He then stated that "[t]he question may be easily decided by the application of a few elementary principles long settled in the Court of Equity." He noted that a contract for sale of any property would immediately pass a beneficial interest in that property, and this applied not only to real estate but also to personal property. This drove him to the inevitable conclusion that:

There can be no doubt, therefore, that if the mortgage deed in the present case had contained nothing but the contract which is involved in the aforesaid covenant of Taylor, the mortgagor, such contract would have amounted to a valid assignment in equity of the whole of the machinery and chattels in question, supposing such machinery and effects to have been in existence and upon the mill at the time of the execution of the deed.

He accepted that a contract for the sale of property which does not exist at the time is law. However, he felt that there was a crucial distinction between the position at law and in equity:

if a vendor or mortgagor agrees to sell or mortgage property, real or personal, of which he is not possessed at the time, and he receives the consideration for the contract, and afterwards becomes possessed of property answering the description in the contract, there is no doubt that a Court of Equity would compel him to perform, the contract, and that the contract would, in equity, transfer the beneficial interest to the mortgagee or purchaser immediately on the property being acquired.

Therefore, he concluded:

Apply these familiar principles to the present case; it follows that immediately on the new machinery and effects being fixed or placed in the mill, they became subject to the operation of the contract, and passed in equity to the mortgagees, to whom Taylor was bound to make a legal conveyance, and for whom he, in the meantime, was a trustee of the property in question.

Lord Wensleydale affirmed that if an agreement was specifically enforceable, then once the property was acquired, then an incohate interest in the property vested immediately.

== Consequences ==
The decision had a transformative effect on security interests and the ability of companies to raise finance. It led indirectly to the decision of Giffard LJ in In re Panama, New Zealand, and Australian Royal Mail Co (1870) 5 Ch App 318 which is generally accepted as the first decision under English law to recognise a floating charge.
