= Aluminium Industrie Vaassen BV v Romalpa Aluminium Ltd =

1976 UK legal case

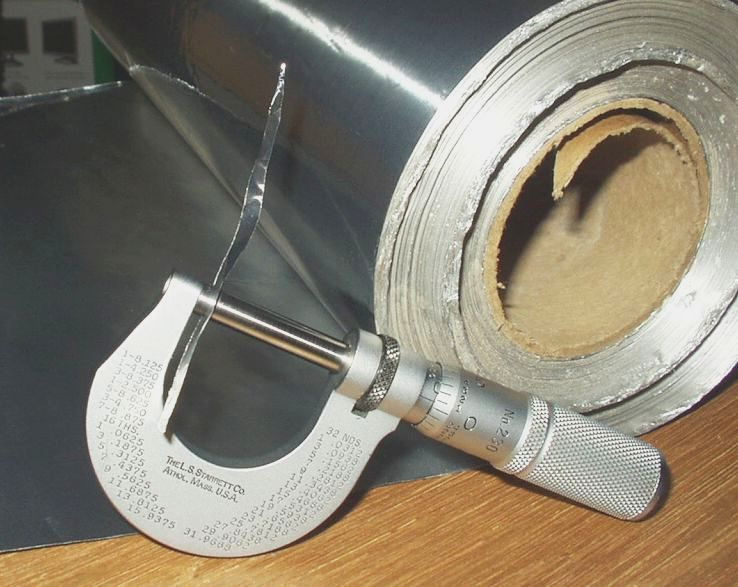
- Court: Court of Appeal of England and Wales
- Citation: [1976] 2 All ER 552, [1976] 1 WLR 676

Court membership
- Judges sitting: Roskill LJ; Goff LJ; Megaw LJ

Keywords
- Security interest, Romalpa clause

Aluminium Industrie Vaassen BV v Romalpa Aluminium Ltd [1976] 1 WLR 676 is a landmark UK insolvency law case, concerning a quasi-security interest in a company's assets and priority of creditors in a company winding up.

== Facts ==
Aluminium Industrie Vaasen BV was a Dutch supplier of aluminium foil. Romalpa Aluminium Ltd processed it in their factory. In the contract of sale, it said that ownership of the foil would only be transferred to Romalpa when the purchase price had been paid in full and products made from the foil should be kept by the buyers as bailees (the contract referring to the Dutch expression ‘fiduciary owners’) separately from other stock on AIV’s behalf as ‘surety’ for the rest of the price. But it also said Romalpa had the power to sell the manufactured articles in the course of business. When such sales took place, this would be deemed to be as an agent for AIV. Romalpa went insolvent, and the receiver and manager of Romalpa's bank, Hume Corporation Ltd, wanted the aluminium to be caught by its floating charge. AlV contended that its contract was effective to retain title to the goods, and so it did not need to share them with other creditors in the liquidation.

== Judgment ==
=== High Court ===
Mocatta J held the retention of title clause was effective. Aluminium Industrie Vaasen was still the owner of the aluminium foil, and could trace the price due to them into the proceeds of sale of the finished goods, ahead of Romalpa’s unsecured and secured creditors. He said the following.

The preservation of ownership clause contains unusual and fairly elaborate provisions departing substantially from the debtor/creditor relationship and shows, in my view, the intention to create a fiduciary relationship to which the principle stated in In re Hallett's Estate, applies. A further point made by Mr Pickering was that if the plaintiffs were to succeed in their tracing claim this would, in effect, be a method available against a liquidator to a creditor of avoiding the provisions establishing the need to register charges on book debts: see section 95(1)(2)(e) of the Companies Act 1948 [now Companies Act 2006 section 860(7)(g)]. He used this only as an argument against the effect of clause 13 contended for by Mr. Lincoln As to this, I think Mr Lincoln's answer was well founded, namely, that if property in the foil never passed to the defendants with the result that the proceeds of sub-sales belonged in equity to the plaintiffs, section 95(1) [now Companies Act 2006 section 860] had no application.

=== Court of Appeal ===
Roskill LJ, Goff LJ and Megaw LJ upheld the decision, and that Aluminium Industrie Vaassen retained title to the unused aluminium foil.

== Influence ==
In the commercial law of Commonwealth countries including Australia, clauses in contracts of purchase and sale providing that the seller retains title in the goods sold until the seller receives payment in full from the buyer are known as Romalpa clauses. In Canada and the United States, these contracts are sometimes called conditional sale agreements.

== See also ==
- Romalpa clause
- UK insolvency law
