= Re Panama, New Zealand, and Australian Royal Mail Co =

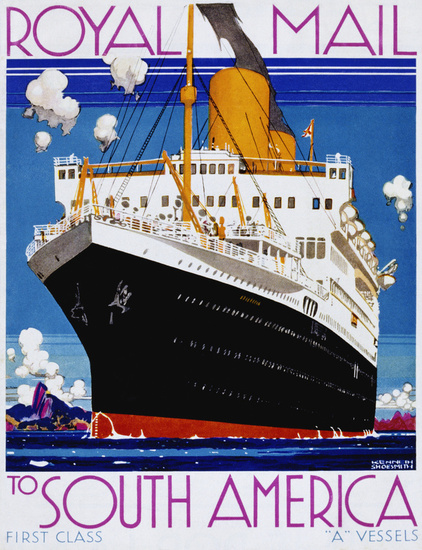
- Court: Court of Appeal
- Full case name: In re Panama, New Zealand, and Australian Royal Mail Company, Limited
- Decided: 14 February 1870
- Citation: (1870) 5 Ch App 318

Court membership
- Judge sitting: Sir G.M. Giffard LJ

Keywords
- Security interest; floating charge

Re Panama, New Zealand, and Australian Royal Mail Co (1870) 5 Ch App 318 is generally accepted as the first decision under English law to recognise a floating charge.

The reported decision is extremely short, and the judgment itself is only two pages. The word "floating charge" does not appear in it.

== Decision ==
The case related to an appeal by a debenture holder against an order of Malins VC. The appeal came before Giffard LJ. The issue centred upon the company's ability to assign all of its "undertaking" to a mortgagee, and whether undertaking included the proceeds of sale of vessels belonging to the company.

The appellants relied upon the decision of the House of Lords in Holroyd v Marshall (1862) 10 HLC 191 that a mortgage requires that the mortgagee must have the power to prevent the mortgagee from removing the property. Here not only could the ships be sailed out of the jurisdiction, the company could also "deal with them as they pleased", including ultimately selling them.

Giffard LJ held:

I have no hesitation in saying that in this particular case, and having regard to the state of this particular company, the word "undertaking" had reference to all the property of the company. And I take the object and meaning of the debenture to be this, that the word "undertaking" necessarily infers that the company will go on, and that the debenture holder could not interfere until either the interest which was due was unpaid, or until the period had arrived for the payment of his principal, and that principal was unpaid. I think the meaning and object of the security was this, that the company might go on during the interval, and, furthermore, that during the interval the debenture holder would not be entitled to an account of mesne profits, or of any dealing with the property of the company in the ordinary course of carrying on their business.

The court was clearly at pains to limit its ruling to the individual case. In addition to stressing "in this particular case, and having regard to the state of this particular company", his Lordship went on to say "I do not refer to such things as sale or mortgages of property". However, that notwithstanding, the case continued to be applied and the role of floating charges, having been implicitly recognised expressly enforced, continued to develop and to grow.

== Precedent ==
Although the case is cited as the genesis of the floating charge in English law, that phrase is not used in the judgment. In Re Colonial Trusts Corporation (1879) 15 Ch D 465 Sir George Jessel MR first referred to security as being "floating security", and this phrase was contrasted with a fixed charge, until it came to eventually be known as a floating charge.
