= Conditional sale =

Type of real estate transaction

A conditional sale is a real estate transaction where the parties have set conditions.

A standard real estate transaction usually begins when a prospective purchaser submits an offer to purchase to the vendor of a property. As in a standard offer, a conditional offer sets out the terms of the sale such as the purchase price, the date of closing, the names of the parties, and the amount of any required deposit, but it also stipulates various conditions which must be met in order for the contract to be binding on the parties. These conditions may include approval by a co-purchaser, financing acceptable to the purchaser, the receipt and review of a survey showing that the buildings on the property comply with local zoning regulations, a title search showing no unacceptable liens or encumbrances, confirmation from the current mortgagee that the property is not in foreclosure, and the like. If the offer is accepted by the vendor, the offer to purchase will become a contract binding on the parties when all conditions are satisfied.

An alternative to a conditional sale is an invitation to treat. Unlike a conditional sale, an invitation to treat does not become binding upon satisfaction of any conditions. Issues arise as to the distinction between actions which constitute an offer or an invitation to treat, especially when the intentions of the parties are not clearly specified at the time.
