= Sydney Templeman, Baron Templeman =

British judge

The Right Honourable The Lord Templeman MBE PC
- Lord Templeman in 1982

Lord of Appeal in Ordinary
- In office 30 September 1982 – 30 September 1994
- Preceded by: The Lord Russell of Killowen
- Succeeded by: The Lord Nicholls of Birkenhead

Lord Justice of Appeal
- In office 1978–1982

Justice of the High Court
- In office 1972–1978

Member of the House of Lords
- Lord Temporal
- Lord of Appeal in Ordinary; 30 September 1982 – 4 June 2014

Personal details
- Born: Sydney William Templeman; 3 March 1920
- Died: 4 June 2014 (aged 94)
- Spouses: Margaret Joan Rowles (m. 1946; died 1988); Sheila Barton Edworthy (m. 1996; died 2008)
- Relations: Anthony Templeman
- Education: St John's College, Cambridge
- Profession: Barrister

Sydney William Templeman, Baron Templeman, MBE, PC (3 March 1920 – 4 June 2014) was a British judge. He served as a Lord of Appeal in Ordinary from 1982 to 1995.

== Early life and career ==
Templeman was born on 3 March 1920, the son of Herbert William Templeman (a coal merchant) & his wife Lilian née Pheasant. He was educated at Southall Grammar School and St John's College, Cambridge, where he was a scholar and read History. His studies were interrupted by World War II. In 1941, he was commissioned into the 4 Gorkha Rifles, and saw action on the Northwest Frontier, at Arakan, Imphal, and Burma. For his wartime service, he was mentioned in dispatches, and was demobilised as an honorary Major, and then later appointed an MBE for his war service.

Following the war, he returned to Cambridge to finish his studies, and read law. He was called to the bar by the Middle Temple, where he was a Harmsworth Scholar, but joined Lincoln's Inn ad eundem as a MacMahon Scholar. He also practised at the Chancery bar. One notable case which he worked on was Anisminic v Foreign Compensation Commission in which he was counsel for the respondents, the Foreign Compensation Commission.

Templeman became a member of the Bar Council in 1961, and was made a Queen's Counsel in 1964. He was elected a Bencher of the Middle Temple in 1969. He was Attorney-General of the Duchy of Lancaster between 1970 and 1972.

== Judicial career ==
Templeman was appointed to the High Court and assigned to the Chancery Division in 1972, and received the customary knighthood. He was subsequently appointed a Lord Justice of Appeal in 1978, and was sworn into the Privy Council. Sitting at first instance in EMI Limited v Pandit [1975] 1 All ER 418, he granted the first Anton Piller order in English legal history.

On 30 September 1982, Templeman was made a Lord of Appeal in Ordinary and created a life peer under the Appellate Jurisdiction Act 1876, taking the title Baron Templeman, of White Lackington in the County of Somerset.

Lord Templeman made significant contributions to English law during his time as a judge, both within and outside his specialist field of tax law and intellectual property law. He gave leading speeches upholding orthodox doctrine against calls for reform in the important land law cases of Prudential Assurance Co Ltd v London Residuary Body [1992] 2 AC 386 and Rhone v Stephens [1994] 2 AC 310. He also sponsored the Land Registration Act 1988, which led to the land register of England and Wales being open to the public for the first time in 1990.

=== Revenue cases ===
Templeman is famous for paving the way for later judges to combat tax avoidance. He is famous for the concept of "Sham Transactions" introduced in the case of Black Nominees Ltd v Nicol (Inspector of Taxes). This case (which concerned an avoidance scheme adopted by the advisers of the actress Julie Christie) was groundbreaking as for the first time, judges were able to depart from the controversial Duke of Westminster Doctrine. Consequently, the business/commercial motive of a transaction conducted by a taxpayer would be considered. Notwithstanding this he was also famous for being a supporter of the Ramsay Doctrine and was notable for writing a scathing public letter (in retirement) to Lord Hoffman for wanting to move away from the Ramsay Principle in the Ramsay case. Ironically, during his time at the bar he had been active in advising on tax mitigation schemes for his clients, although this may have helped formulate his later views on the bench.

=== Social views ===
Templeman also handed down a number of judgments which were very socially conservative. In R v Brown [1993] UKHL 19 when considering whether injuries inflicted during sadomasochistic sex with the consent of all parties was legal, he said: "Society is entitled and bound to protect itself against a cult of violence. Pleasure derived from the infliction of pain is an evil thing. Cruelty is uncivilised." Templeman was also one of the dissenting judges in the famous case of Gillick v West Norfolk and Wisbech AHA [1986] AC 112, arguing, among other things, that sub-16-year-old girls should not be having sex and, therefore, cannot legally consent to being prescribed contraceptives by a physician (thus necessitating parental consent to obtain prescription contraceptives).

Other significant cases, in which Lord Templeman appeared, were the Spycatcher case (relating to the duty of confidentiality and the Official Secrecy Act) and dismissing the claims of the mother of Jacqueline Hill, the last victim of the Peter Sutcliffe (the "Yorkshire Ripper"), against the police for failing to apprehend the killer before he murdered her.

=== Judicial style ===
During his time on the bench, Lord Templeman was known to be short with counsel who persisted with a line of argument after he had made up his mind, which earned him the affectionate sobriquet "Syd Vicious".

Lord Templeman was also renowned for his colourful language. In Borden (UK) Ltd v Scottish Timber Products Ltd [1979] 3 WLR 672 at 686 he remarked:

"At some distant date, when the court has unearthed the unearthable, traced the untraceable and calculated the incalculable, there will emerge the sum, which it is said belongs to the plaintiffs in equity. This sum, which is immune from the claims of Crown and mortgagee, debenture holder and creditor, a sum secured to the plaintiffs by a simple retention of title clause, which referred only to resin but was pregnant with all the consequences alleged in the statement of claim and hidden from the gaze of all other persons who dealt with the defendants."

When he expressed judicial opinions – either on legal or social issues – he often did so in strident tones. In A-G for Hong Kong v Reid [1993] UKPC 36, he referred to bribery as an "evil practice which threatens the foundations of any civilised society". In Hazell v Hammersmith and Fulham LBC [1992] 2 AC 1 when counsel tried to rely upon the decision in Sutton's Hospital Case (1612) 10 Co Rep 1 he said: "This argument strikes me as being not so much arcane as absurd."

However, he was also capable of striking a deeply compassionate note. Whilst dismissing the claim of Anita Hill's mother for the murder of her daughter, he said: "The appellant, Mrs. Hill, is tormented with the unshakeable belief that her daughter would be alive today if the respondent the West Yorkshire police force had been more efficient. That belief is entitled to respect and understanding. Damages cannot compensate for the brutal extinction of a young life."

== Personal ==
Templeman was an active freemason.

== Family ==
Lord Templeman had two sons, Peter (a Church of England vicar) and Michael (a barrister).

== Death ==
Lord Templeman died on 4 June 2014.

== Arms ==
Coat of arms of Sydney Templeman, Baron Templeman
Crest An eagle Or, beaked and legged and wings displayed Gules, gorged with a coronet its finials of roses also Gules, and supporting by the dexter claw a kukri erect with the point of the blade outwards Proper. Escutcheon Per pale Azure and Gules a fess raguly between a lion passant in chief and in base a fleur-de-lys bourgeonny Gold. Supporters Dexter a cock pheasant, sinister a hen pheasant. Both guardant and in the beak of each a grain of wheat Proper.

== Notable cases ==
- Anisminic v Foreign Compensation Commission [1969] 2 AC 147
- Black Nominees Ltd v Nicol [1975] TR 93; [1975] STC 372
- EMI Limited v Pandit [1975] 1 All ER 418
- Mandla v Dowell-Lee [1983] 2 AC 548
- Street v Mountford [1985] AC 809
- Gillick v West Norfolk Area Health Authority [1985] AC 112
- Miles v Wakefield Metropolitan District Council [1987] AC 539
- China and South Sea Bank v Tan [1990] 1 AC 536
- JH Rayner (Mincing Lane) Ltd v Department of Trade and Industry [1990] 2 AC 418
- Lipkin Gorman v Karpnale Ltd [1991] 3 WLR 10
- Prudential Assurance Co Ltd v London Residuary Body [1992] 2 AC 386
- R v Brown [1994] 1 AC 212
- Attorney General for Hong Kong v Reid [1994] 1 AC 324, [1994] 1 NZLR 1 (PC)
