= Business as usual (business) =

Normal operation of a business

Business as usual (BAU), the normal execution of standard functional operations within an organisation, forms a possible contrast to projects or programmes which might introduce change. BAU may also stand in contradistinction to external events which may have the effect of unsettling or distracting those inside an organisation.

== Goals ==
In business continuity planning, organizations aim to maintain critical business functions during disruptions and resume normal operations with minimal downtime.

== In climatology ==
"Business as usual" is a phrase frequently used in climate change studies to warn of the dangers of not implementing changes to prevent the world from warming further.

== See also ==
- Conceptual framework
