= Voidable floating charge =

In law, a voidable floating charge refers to a floating charge entered into shortly prior to the company going into liquidation which is void or unenforceable in whole or in part under applicable insolvency legislation.

Generally speaking, a floating charge is only potentially vulnerable if it is entered into within the vulnerability period under applicable law. The vulnerability period is a period prescribed by statute immediately preceding the company going into liquidation. Most jurisdictions provide for alternative vulnerability periods: a longer one for parties who are "connected" to the company, and a shorter one for unrelated third parties.

The effect of laws relating to voidable floating charges varies from jurisdiction to jurisdiction. Some countries simply provide that such charge are automatically void or not enforceable, In other jurisdictions, they are only voidable and an application must be made by a liquidator or creditor for the floating charge to be set aside.

In most jurisdictions, a floating charge is only vulnerable to the extent that it does not secure new money for the company. So if a bank has a loan of £100 outstanding to a company, and it advances a further £50 but takes an "all-monies" floating charge as security, and the company goes into liquidation three months later, the floating charge will validly secure the £50 advance which was made at the time, but not the earlier £100. Legislation relating to voidable floating charges is intended to prevent abuse of a security interest which catches literally all of the assets of the company, and could be used by person to strip out all of the assets from a company in difficulty from the unsecured creditors. However, if the holder of the floating charge has inserted new money, then giving the holder a valid security up to the amount of the new money injected does not prejudice the position of the unsecured creditors.

Most legislation relating to voidable floating charges is also expressed to apply to charges which, as created, were floating charges but which subsequently crystallised into fixed charges.
