= Title retention clause =

Provision in a sale of goods contract

A retention of title clause (also called a reservation of title clause or a Romalpa clause in some jurisdictions) is a provision in a contract for the sale of goods that the title to the goods remains vested in the seller until the buyer fulfils certain obligations (usually payment of the purchase price).

== Purpose ==
The main purpose of retention of title ("ROT" or "RoT") clauses is to ensure that where goods are supplied on credit, if the buyer subsequently goes into bankruptcy, the seller can repossess the goods. They are often seen as a natural extension of the credit economy; where suppliers are expected to sell goods on credit, there is a reasonable expectation that if they are not paid they should be able to repossess the goods. Nonetheless, in a number of jurisdictions, insolvency regimes or credit arrangement regimes prevent title retention clauses from being enforced where doing so would upset administration of the regime.

Retention of title clauses are mandated in the European Union by Article 9 of the Late Payments Directive, and sellers' ROT rights are recognized by Article 7 of the Insolvency Regulation.

Especially prevalent in Germany, these clauses are permitted in the United Kingdom by s.19 of the Sale of Goods Act 1979, which expanded upon the 1976 judgment of the Court of Appeal of England and Wales in Aluminium Industrie Vaassen BV v Romalpa Aluminium Ltd.

In contrast to English law, the common-law jurisdictions in Australia, Canada, New Zealand and the United States have instituted the concept of "security interest", under which ROT clauses may need to be registered in order to have effect:

- in the United States, states have adopted Article 9 of the Uniform Commercial Code, which limits the clause's effectiveness
- common-law provinces in Canada have adopted their Personal Property Security Acts which operate similarly
- in Quebec, there is no "presumption of hypothec", and therefore an ROT clause is not considered to be a security interest; art. 1497 of the Civil Code of Quebec provides that "An obligation is conditional where it is made to depend upon a future and uncertain event," which gives legal authority to such clauses
- Australia and New Zealand have also adopted their own versions of the Personal Property Security Act.

Simple ROT clauses are generally effective in protecting sellers' interests in Hong Kong, but in some cases a clause would not be enforceable.

== Legal analysis ==
Although title retention clauses are conceptually quite straightforward, they have become increasingly widely drafted, which has resulted in the courts in a number of countries striking down the clauses, or recharacterising them as the grant of a security interest. It has consequently been noted that "the practical outcome of a series of later cases has put it beyond doubt that 'extended' title reservation clauses will not work." Several particular problems have been identified:

- If for example, the clause reserves only part of the title to the seller (instead of reserving title to the whole thing) then in many jurisdictions this is recharacterised as an equitable charge, and is often void if certain registration requirements are not complied with.
- Problems can also arise where the goods sold are mixed with other goods of a similar nature, so that they are no longer identifiable (e.g. a quantity of oil, or grain).
- Many jurisdictions allow the buyer to re-sell the goods before title has passed to him (often this is the only way that he can pay the seller). In many jurisdictions such an onward sale passes good title to the subsequent purchaser, and the original seller loses title despite the clause
- Where the seller tries to have a clause which provides that, if the buyer re-sells the goods, then the proceeds of sale of the goods shall be held on trust for the seller, this can be recharacterised as a registrable charge, which may also be void for non-registration.
- Another frequently litigated problem occurs where the goods which are subject to the clause are then either improved (e.g. raw thread is worked into cloth) or mixed with other raw materials to form a new product (e.g. silica is used to make glass).
- In some countries, where a clause purports to retain title until, not only the purchase price, but also any other debts of the buyer to the seller are paid in full, such clauses have been struck down for non-compliance with security registration requirements in those jurisdictions.

There are four categories of ROTs, namely "simple clauses", all monies clauses, proceeds clauses and mixed goods clauses. All monies clauses, or "all sums due" clauses, reserve title in all goods supplied to a buyer, until the buyer has settled all outstanding invoices from the seller, whereas "simple clauses" reserve title only to a specific consignment of goods. One benefit of an all monies clause is that specific goods held at the buyer's premises do not need to be match to specific unpaid invoices.

== Sample clauses ==
Retention of title clauses will obviously vary from country to country, and even within countries they will usually be specialised to the form of industry used in, and the type of goods which are sold. The following are just two examples of the types of clause which can be seen.

A shorter form clause:

1. Title to {the Goods} shall remain vested in {the Seller} and shall not pass to {the Buyer} until the purchase price for {the Goods} has been paid in full and received by {the Seller}.

A longer form clause:

1. Title to {the Goods} shall remain vested in {the Seller} and shall not pass to {the Buyer} until the purchase price for {the Goods} has been paid in full and received by {the Seller}. Until title to {the Goods} passes:
  1. {the Seller} shall have authority to retake, sell or otherwise deal with and/or dispose of all or any part of {the Goods};
  2. {the Seller} and its agents and employees shall be entitled at any time and without the need to give notice enter upon any property upon which {the Goods} or any part are stored, or upon which {the Seller} reasonably believes them to be kept;
  3. {the Buyer} shall store or mark {the Goods} in a manner reasonably satisfactory to {the Seller} indicating that title to {the Goods} remains vested in {the Seller}; and
  4. {the Buyer} shall insure {the Goods} to their full replacement value, and arrange for {the Seller} to be noted on the policy of insurance as the loss payee.
2. Irrespective of whether title to {the Goods} remains vested in {the Seller}, risk in {the Goods} shall pass to {the Buyer} upon delivery.

== Case list ==
- Aluminium Industrie Vaassen BV v Romalpa Aluminium Ltd [1976] 1 WLR 676
- Re Bond Worth Ltd, [1980] Ch 228
- Re Peachdart Ltd [1984] Ch 131, if the clause applies to something not yet made, then it is a charge and must be registered to be effective.
- Clough Mill Ltd v Martin [1984] 3 All ER 982, explains how a "simple clause" operates and dispels "any remaining doubts" as to the validity of "all monies" and "all sums due" clauses.
- Indian Oil v Greenstone Shipping [1987] 3 WLR 869
- E Pfeiffer v Arbuthnot Factors [1988] 1 WLR 150
- Compaq Computer v Abercorn [1991] BCC 484, which drastically reduced the possibility of a proceeds of sale-style retention of title clause ever succeeding. In this case, the existence of a fiduciary relationship was denied on a 'true construction' of the contract, despite the terms of the contract clearly providing that there was to be such a relationship (the contract stipulated that the bailee, the buyer, was to be the agent of the seller, the bailor, thereby construing a fiduciary relationship)
- Armour v Thyssen Edelstahlwerke AG, [1991] AC 339, [1991] 2 AC 339 - a House of Lords case which upheld the validity of a retention of title clause.
- Chaigley Farms Ltd v Crawford, Kaye and Grayshire Ltd, [1996] BCC 957: title was extinguished when there was a significant change to the nature of the goods
- PST Energy 7 Shipping LLC Product Shipping & Trading S.A. v O.W. Bunker Malta Ltd & Ors, [2015] EWCA Civ 1058 (22 October 2015)

Moore-Bick J cogently summaries the effects of the Clough Mills, Armour and Chaigley Farms rulings, and their application to the case in hand, in the PST Energy 7 Shipping case.

== General and cited references ==
- Rolf B. Johnson (1994). "A Uniform Solution to Common Law Confusion: Retention of Title under English and U.S. Law". Berkeley Journal of International Law. 12 (1): 99–129.
- Michael G. Bridge; Roderick A. Macdonald; Ralph L. Simmonds; Catherine Walsh (1999). "Formalism, Functionalism, and Understanding the Law of Secured Transactions" (PDF). McGill Law Journal. 44 (3): 567–664.
- William Davies (2006). "Romalpa thirty years on — still an enigma?" (PDF). Hertfordshire Law Journal. 4 (2). University of Hertfordshire: 2–23.
- Anthony Duggan (2011). "Romalpa Agreements Post-PPSA". Sydney Law Review. 33 (4): 645–685.
- "The BExA Guide to Retention of Title Clauses in Export Contracts" (PDF). British Exporters Association. October 2005.
