= Recharacterisation =

Recharacterisation in law (and sometimes in accountancy) means the treatment of a certain course of conduct in a different manner to which the participants describe it.

The term is most important in the penal law of Continental legal systems. In some civil law countries, judges are empowered to "recharacterise the facts" of a case to make the charges more closely align with the evidence. In these systems, the legal charges contained in the indictment are only suggestions from the public prosecutor to the court. The judge may, if it becomes clear that the facts actually support different or additional charges, change the legal characterisation of those facts.

Under English law, Lord Hanworth MR referred to the proposition:

It is old law, and plain law, that in transactions of this sort the Court must consider whether or not the documents really mask the true transaction. If they do merely mask the transaction, the Court must have regard to the true position, in substance and in fact, and for this purpose tear away the mask or cloak that has been put upon the real transaction.

When the recharacterisation of the facts results in additional charges, or charges which carry a greater penalty, the defense council is usually given an opportunity to be heard concerning the recharacterisation and may request a suspension of the trial to study the recharacterisation. In others, this right to suspend the trial is only implicated if the recharacterisation results in more serious charges.

In some legal systems, the court may not recharacterise the facts if it will result in more serious charges.

- In the United States the term recharacterisation (or recharacterization) is usually used to refer to money which is advance to a company as a loan by a shareholder or other insider, which is recharacterised on bankruptcy as a capital contribution to the shareholder's equity.
- Also in the US, recharacterization is used in tax law to refer to treatment for tax purposes of a transaction, agreement, event, etc., differently than for other purposes. Examples include recharacterization of gains as dividends under 26 U.S.C. § 1248, recharacterization of purported debt instruments as equity under case law and rulings under 26 U.S.C. § 385, and recharacterization of entities under "check the box" regulations 26 CFR 301.7701-2.
- In other common law legal systems, recharacterisation usually refers to the risk that a title transfer arrangement could be treated instead as the grant of a security interest. If a transaction is recharacterised in this manner, there is a risk that the transaction may be void if it has not been registered under applicable registration laws. The title transfer arrangements that are perceived to be vulnerable to recharacterisation are transfers of margin (such as a title transfer under an English Law ISDA Credit Support Annex as collateral for a derivatives transaction), or transactions which involved an actual transfer of securities backed by cash (such a stock loan or repo transaction). Retention of title clauses may also sometimes be recharacterized in this manner. Security interests which are expressed as fixed charges are sometimes recharacterised as floating charges. However, in most common law systems, there is a resistance to recharacterisation transactions of this nature, and the law generally provides that the parties own characterisation of the transaction should be applied unless there are strong countervailing reasons to recharacterise.
- Another area in which the courts have had to address recharacterization risk is in relation to the transfer of receivables, frequently in securitization transactions. To be effective a securitization normally requires a "true sale" of receivable, but in certain countries there is a risk of the transfer being recharacterised. If the originator retains a right or an obligation regarding the transferred assets, for example, where the transferor has agreed to assume and bear the credit risk for the transferred receivables, or where the transferor is entitled or obligated to repurchase and regain the transferred receivables, under many legal systems this would be recharacterised as either an on-loan or a collection agency arrangement.
- Certain sophisticated financial instruments (such as a synthetic lease) are considered to be a recharacterization risk in some jurisdictions.

However, the application of recharacterization is also a general principle of the law of most countries, and may be applied to an artificial arrangement which seeks to artificially overcome a certain law or regulation. For example, in Street v Mountford [1985] 1 AC 809 the House of Lords confirmed that an agreement described as a license for non-exclusive occupation of a property should, in fact, be treated as a lease for the purposes of determining the licensees' (or tenants') rights, although Lord Templeman did not actually use the phrase "recharacterisation" in his speech. Similar, in many jurisdictions, tax authorities have power recharacterize transactions that are "shams", or which otherwise have no commercial substance except to mitigate tax liability.
