= Floating charge =

Security interest over a fund of changing assets of a legal entity

In finance, a floating charge is a security interest over a fund of changing assets of a company or other legal person. Unlike a fixed charge, which is created over ascertained and definite property, a floating charge is created over property of an ambulatory and shifting nature, such as receivables and stock.

The floating charge 'floats' or 'hovers' until the point at which it is converted ("crystallised") into a fixed charge, attached to specific assets of the business. This crystallisation can be triggered by a number of events. In most common law jurisdictions it is an implied term in the security documents creating floating charges that a cessation of the company's right to deal with the assets (including by reason of insolvency proceedings) in the ordinary course of business leads to automatic crystallisation. Additionally, security documents will usually include express terms that a default by the person granting the security will trigger crystallisation.

In most countries floating charges can only be granted by companies. If an individual person or a partnership (Note: Although not a limited liability partnership with separate legal personality.) was to try to grant a floating charge, then in most jurisdictions which recognise floating charges this would be void as a general assignment in bankruptcy. (Note: For example, under English law, a general assignment of book debts by a natural person is void as regards book debts that were not paid before the presentation of the bankruptcy petition, unless the assignment has been registered under the Bills of Sale Act 1878 if the person goes into bankruptcy. See section 344(2) of the Insolvency Act 1986.)

Floating charges take effect in equity only, and consequently are defeated by a bona fide purchaser for value without notice of any asset covered by them. In practice, as the charger has power to dispose of assets subject to a floating charge, so this is only of consequence in relation to disposals that occur after the charge has crystallised.

== History ==
The floating charge has been described as "one of equity's most brilliant creations". They are legal devices created entirely by lawyers in private practice; there is no legislation or judicial decision that was the genesis of a floating charge.

In Holroyd v Marshall (1862) 10 HL Cas 191 it was held that equity would recognise a charge over after-acquired property as being effective to create a security interest over that property automatically upon its acquisition. This decision lead to "a further manifestation of the English genius for harnessing the most abstract conceptions to the service of commerce". Documents came to be drafted that purported to grant security over all of the debtor's present and future property, but by contract expressly permitted the debtor to dispose of those assets, free from the charge, until such times as the debtor's business ceased. This charge came to be known as the "floating charge".

The first recorded English case where a floating charge was recognised was Re Panama, New Zealand, and Australian Royal Mail Co (1870) 5 Ch App 318. The Court of Appeal held that the effect of the document was that the secured creditor could not interfere with the running of the business and its dealings with its own assets until the winding up of the company, but the occurrence of that event entitled the secured creditor to realise its security over the assets and to assert its charge in priority to the general body of creditors.

The use of such floating charges increased in popularity and expanded rapidly until, as Lord Walker described it: "The floating charge had become a cuckoo in the nest of corporate insolvency." Criticism of the effect of floating charges grew, until Lord Macnaghten finally proclaimed in Salomon v A Salomon & Co Ltd [1896] UKHL 1, [1897] AC 22:

For such a catastrophe as has occurred in this case some would blame the law that allows the creation of a floating charge. But a floating charge is too convenient a form of security to be lightly abolished. I have long thought, and I believe some of your Lordships also think, that the ordinary trade creditors of a trading company ought to have a preferential claim on the assets in liquidation in respect of debts incurred within a certain limited time before the winding-up. But that is not the law at present. Everybody knows that when there is a winding-up debenture-holders generally step in and sweep off everything; and a great scandal it is. (emphasis added)

This led to a push back against the effect of floating charges in the form of the Preferential Payments in Bankruptcy Amendment Act 1897.

== Definition ==
"A floating security is an equitable charge on the assets for the time being of a going concern. It attaches to the subject charged in the varying condition in which it happens to be from time to time. It is the essence of such a charge that it remains dormant until the undertaking ceases to be a going concern, or until the person in whose favour the charge is created intervenes. His right to intervene may of course be suspended by agreement. But if there is no agreement for suspension, he may exercise his right whenever he pleases after default."

Later in Illingworth v Houldsworth [1904] AC 355 at 358 he stated:

"...a floating charge is ambulatory and shifting in nature, hovering over and so to speak floating with the property which it is intended to affect until some event occurs or some act is done which causes it to settle and fasten on the subject of the charge within its reach and grasp."

A description was subsequently given in Re Yorkshire Woolcombers Association [1903] 2 Ch 284, and despite Romer LJ clearly stating in that case that he did not intend to give a definition of the term floating charge, his description is generally cited as the most authoritative definition of what a floating charge is:

- it is a charge over a class of assets present and future;
- that class will be changing from time to time; and
- until the charge crystallises and attaches to the assets, the chargor may carry on its business in the ordinary way.

When conducting a recent review of the authorities, the House of Lords brought some clarity to this area of law in National Westminster bank plc v Spectrum Plus Ltd [2005] UKHL 41. The essential test of whether a charge was a fixed charge related to the chargor's power to continue to deal with the asset. In order to preserve the status of a charge as a fixed one, the bank must exercise actual control over disposal of the asset. If the chargor is able to deal with the asset, such as by drawing from the account in which charged funds are kept, or into which the proceeds of trade receivables are deposited, then the holder of the charge does not have effective control. They said:

"the asset subject to the charge is not finally appropriated as a security for the payment of the debt until the occurrence of some future event. In the meantime the chargor is left free to use the charged asset and to remove it from the security."

== Nature of the chargee's interest ==
Several authors have suggested that the floating chargee, prior to crystallisation, may have no proprietary interest at all in the charged assets. However, this is inconsistent with cases (such as Spectrum) at the highest level which suggest a proprietary interest does exist.

Alternatively, the floating chargee may have an inchoate type of proprietary interest, with characteristics that are proprietary but of a lesser order than the proprietary interest of a chargee with a fixed charge. Some authors have suggested that there is an interest in a fund of assets, but the nature and incidents of the interest remain unclear. This has received some judicial support, from Lord Walker in Spectrum, for example.

Another possibility is that the holder of a floating charge may have the same quality of proprietary interest as a fixed chargee, but one that is subject to defeasance or overreaching by permitted dealings by the chargor with the charged assets.

== Flexibility ==
Floating charges are popular as a security device for two principal reasons. From the secured creditor's perspective, the security will cover each and every asset of the chargor. From the charger's perspective, although all of their assets are encumbered, because the security "floats", they remain free to deal with the assets and dispose of them in the ordinary course of business, thereby obtaining the maximum credit benefit from the lender, but without the inconvenience of requiring the secured creditor's consent to dispose of stock in trade.

However, in many jurisdictions, floating charges are required to be registered in order to perfect them; otherwise they may be unenforceable on the bankruptcy of the debtor. This registration requirement has often led to other property rights (such as rights under a defective retention of title clause), which have been re-characterized as a floating charge being held to be void for non-registration.

== Remedies ==
Broadly speaking, holding a floating charge gives the secured creditor two key remedies in the event of non-payment of the secured debt by the company. Firstly, the secured creditor can crystallise the charge, and then sell off any assets that the charge then attaches to as if the charge was a fixed charge. Secondly (and more frequently the case, to preserve the company as a going concern), if the floating charge encompasses substantially all of the assets and undertaking of the company, the secured creditor can appoint an administrative receiver to take over the management and control of the business with a view to discharging the debt out of income or selling off the entire business as a going concern.

In countries that permit the making of an administration order, the floating charge had another key benefit. The holder of a floating charge could appoint an administrative receiver and block the appointment of a court-appointed administrator, and thus retain control of the distribution of the assets of the company. Practice became such that companies were asked to give "lightweight" floating charges to secured lenders which had no collateral value purely to allow the holders to block administration orders, an approach that was approved by the courts in Re Croftbell Ltd [1990] BCC 781. In the United Kingdom the law has now been changed by statute, but the power to block appointments of administrators has been retained in many other common law jurisdictions.

=== Crystallisation ===
Strictly speaking, it is not possible to enforce a floating charge at all - the charge must first crystallise into a fixed charge. In the absence of any special provisions in the relevant document, a floating charge crystallises either upon the appointment of a receiver or upon the commencement of liquidation. It has also been suggested, relying upon obiter dictum comments by Lord Macnaghten in Government Stocks and Securities Investments Co Ltd v Manila Rly Co that a charge should also crystallise upon the company ceasing to trade as a going concern. However, this view is not yet supported by judicial authority.

In certain countries, notably Australia and New Zealand, it was for a time very common to include "automatic crystallisation" provisions which would provide that the floating charge would crystallise upon an event of default automatically and without action from the chargee. Automatic crystallisation provisions have been upheld in New Zealand but there are judicial comments suggesting they may not be recognised as effective in Canada. In the United Kingdom there is some inferential support for the validity of automatic crystallisation provisions, but they have never been subject to full judicial consideration.

== Priority ==
The main purpose of any security is to enable the secured creditor to have priority of claim to the bankrupt party's assets in the event of an insolvency. However, because of the nature of floating charge, the priority of floating charge holder's claims normally rank behind:

1. holders of fixed security (such as a mortgage or fixed charge); and
2. preferential creditors, who are given priority by statute.

The floating charge cannot normally be enforced until it has crystallised (and thus, effectively, become a fixed charge) and so most statutes provide that the priority of a fixed charge that was created as a floating charge is treated as a floating charge.

Because of the differences in priority of fixed charges and floating charges, security documents came to be drafted to contain as many charges expressed to be fixed charges as possible, and leave as little as possible covered by the floating charge, where it would have secondary priority to the claims of the preferential creditors. A number of judicial decisions gave conflicting interpretations over the characteristics that were definitive of a fixed charge, particularly with reference to charges over book debts (and a fixed charge that did not contain those characteristics would be "recharacterised" as a floating charge). The position was definitively resolved in NatWest v Spectrum Plus Limited when the House of Lords confirmed that a charge over book debts could be a fixed charge, provided that the secured creditor exhibited the necessary degree of control over the proceeds of the book debts. This would normally require that they either be paid into a blocked account, or that they be paid directly to the secured creditor. Any lesser degree of control was not consistent with a fixed charge, and such charges would be construed as floating charges, regardless of what label the parties had given them.

== Qualifying floating charge ==
In English law, a qualifying floating charge is a floating charge which enables the holder to appoint an administrator or administrative receiver under the Insolvency Act 1986 without the need for an order of the court. The change was introduced by the Enterprise Act 2002, and was designated to streamline the process in relation to the appointment of an administrators (all floating charges historically had the power to appoint an administrative receiver).

A floating charge is a qualifying floating charge if it is expressed to be one, or if the security document purports to give the holder power to appoint an administrator or administrative receiver.

The procedure for appointing an administrator under a qualifying floating charge is as follows:

1. the floating charge holder has given at least two business days written notice to any holders of qualifying floating charges with priority over the applicant's (i.e. in that they were created before or take precedence by way of an agreement), and
2. the relevant floating charge is enforceable (i.e. the holder is entitled to call in the security), and
3. the company is neither in liquidation nor has a provisional liquidator been appointed, and
4. neither an administrator nor an administrative receiver is already in office.

Subsequent to the appointment of an administrator under a qualifying floating charge, the holder of the floating charge must notify the court of the appointment.

== Criticisms ==
Floating charges have been criticised as a "raw deal" for unsecured creditors. In Salomon v. Salomon & Co. [1897] AC 22 Lord Macnaghten observed that the injustice of the case (as he saw it) was not caused by the introduction of the concept of limited liability, but by the excessive security created by the floating charge. In Re London Pressed Hinge Co Ltd [1905] 1 Ch 576 Buckley J observed that great mischief arose from the very nature of the floating charge as few of general unsecured trade creditors of the company would even be aware of its existence.

As most secured lenders will not usually have recourse to their security until the debtor company is in a parlous financial state, the usual position is that even all the remaining assets of the company are not enough to repay the debt secured by the floating charge, leaving the unsecured creditors with nothing. This perception has led to a widening of the classes of preferred creditors who take ahead of the floating charge holders in a number of countries. The introduction of a regime of voidable floating charges for floating charges taken just prior to the onset of insolvency is a partial response to these criticisms.

Some countries have also sought to "ring fence" recoveries made for wrongful trading or fraudulent trading from the floating charge to create an artificial pool of assets available to the unsecured creditors.

=== Voidable floating charges ===
Because of the potential for abuse of a security interest that catches all of a company's assets, many jurisdictions have enacted provisions in their insolvency legislation providing that a floating charge granted shortly prior to the company going into liquidation will be invalid, or invalid to the extent that it does not secure new loans made to the company.

=== Registration ===
In many jurisdictions, because of their dramatic effect on the availability of assets to unsecured creditors on an insolvency, floating charges are required to be registered.

== Analogous security interests ==
=== United States ===
An analogous (but not identical) concept in the United States to the floating charge is the floating lien, which was implemented by Article 9 of the Uniform Commercial Code and is a lien that expanded to cover any additional property that is acquired by the lienee while the debt is outstanding. A critical difference between the floating charge and the floating lien is that UCC security interests, including floating liens, can be granted by any kind of debtor, including individuals or partnerships (and will thus have priority in bankruptcy), whereas the floating charge can be granted only by corporate entities.

The U.S. never adopted the floating charge directly because at the time it was developing in England in the 19th century, U.S. courts generally held that a debtor simply could not create a security interest in future property; general creditors ought to have a pool of unencumbered assets to look to; and even if such a thing could exist, it was a fraudulent conveyance. However, creditors' lawyers gradually developed a diverse variety of methods, some authorized by state legislatures and others tolerated by state courts, to evade the general ban on security interests in future property. As it had become clear that creditors and debtors were going to find ways to create enforceable de facto security interests in after-acquired property and general intangibles whether courts liked it or not, the UCC drafters in the 1940s (particularly Grant Gilmore) successfully argued that such interests should be legitimized and simplified in the form of the floating lien.

=== Quebec ===
When the Quebec Civil Code came into force in 1994 and superseded the Civil Code of Lower Canada, it abolished the charge flottante "floating charge" and created and introduced an analogous security device into Quebec law under the name hypothèque ouverte, or "floating mortgage". As a mortgage, it can be taken over immovables and movables (real and personal property); must be in due form, i.e. passed before a notary and registered; confers rights in rem including priority ranking, right of pursuit (that is, it runs with the land and cannot be defeated by a bona fide purchaser), creditor's consent required to dispose of subject; and grants powers of recourse, including repossession, judicial foreclosure, sale by mortgagee in possession, or administrative receivership.

The floating mortgage can be specific or general with respect to immovables and movables, separately or together. The mortgage is not perfected until it crystallises. Crystallisation occurs upon default of the mortgagor and registration of a notice of default, and the mortgage ranks from the date notice is filed. This means that a floating mortgage ranks lower than a fixed mortgage.

=== Civil law countries ===
Civil law countries generally allow for a commercial pledge to be taken over the pooled movable assets held or acquired for the use of a business or income-producing activity (going concern) and not for sale. The pool is restricted to movable (personal) property of a long-term nature and of value to the operation of the business, specifically inventory and fixed assets, which include movable tangibles such as trade fixtures, equipment, machinery, tools, furniture; and legal intangibles such as company style (name), logos, goodwill, intellectual property, leases.

The pledge never crystallises like a floating charge; instead the pool is a universitas rerum and treated as a single movable security subject. The asset pool is referred to as a fonds de commerce (French), fondo de comercio (Spanish), fondo di commercio (Italian), Geschäftsfonds (German), handelsfonds (Dutch), and so on.

Besides the class of assets secured, the civilian commercial pledge differs from a floating charge in that fixed assets are not always changing, and the creditor ranks prior to all secured and unsecured claims. Commercial pledges exist in common law countries but are usually taken over working capital (floating assets and investments).

== See also ==
- Debenture – Debt instrument
- Security interest – Legal right between a debtor and creditor over the debtor's property (collateral)
- Lien – Security on property or debt
- Voidable floating charge
