= James Roscoe (Bolton) Ltd v Winder =

- Court: High Court
- Citation: [1915] 1 Ch 62

Court membership
- Judge sitting: Sargant

Keywords
- Tracing

James Roscoe (Bolton) Ltd v Winder [1915] 1 Ch 62 is an English trusts law case, concerning asset tracing.

== Facts ==
Mr Winder was the trustee in bankruptcy for Mr William Wigham, who had bought James Roscoe Ltd in March 1913. Mr Wigham had agreed to give the book debts that were received up to a certain date to the sellers. He collected £455 but kept them in his account, so breaching his agreement and fiduciary duty to the company. He spent all but £25, but put in his own money so the balance on his death was £358. James Roscoe Ltd sued to recover all the money in the account, asking to trace the £358. Mr Winder argued the maximum must be only £25, because that was the lowest intermediate balance. Necessarily the other money had been dissipated, and the surplus cash would need to go to pay other creditors.

== Judgment ==
Sargant J held the company could only trace £25, not £358. Once the money was spent, it was gone, down to the lowest bank balance in the interim. The debtor would have needed to substitute money from others for the purpose of using it for the claimant in order to get a trust impressed again.

In re Hallett's Estate, which would but for the circumstance I am going to mention entirely conclude this case, decided two clear points: First, that when a trustee mixes trust moneys with private moneys in one account the cestuis que trust have a charge on the aggregate amount for their trust fund; and, secondly, that when payments are made by the trustee out of the general account the payments are not to be appropriated against payments in to that account as in Clayton's Case, because the trustee is presumed to be honest rather than dishonest and to make payments out of his own private moneys and not out of the trust fund that was mingled with his private moneys.

But there is a further circumstance in the present case which seems to me to be conclusive in favour of the defendant as regards the greater part of the balance of 358l. 5s. 5d. It appears that after the payment in by the debtor of a portion of the book debts which he had received the balance at the bank on May 19, 1913, was reduced by his drawings to a sum of 25l. 18s. only on May 21. So that, although the ultimate balance at the debtor's death was about 358l. there had been an intermediate balance of only 25l. 18s. The result of that seems to me to be that the trust moneys cannot possibly be traced into this common fund, which was standing to the debtor's credit at his death, to an extent of more than 25l. 18s., because, although prima facie under the second rule in In re Hallett's Estate any drawings out by the debtor ought to be attributed to the private moneys which he had at the bank and not to the trust moneys, yet, when the drawings out had reached such an amount that the whole of his private money part had been exhausted, it necessarily followed that the rest of the drawings must have been against trust moneys. There being on May 21, 1913, only 25l. 18s., in all, standing to the credit of the debtor's account, it is quite clear that on that day he must have denuded his account of all the trust moneys there - the whole 455l. 18s. 11d. - except to the extent of 25l. 18s.

Practically, what Mr. Martelli and Mr. Hansell have been asking me to do - although I think Mr. Hansell in particular rather disguised the claim by the phraseology he used - is to say that the debtor, by paying further moneys after May 21 into this common account, was impressing upon those further moneys so paid in the like trust or obligation, or charge of the nature of a trust, which had formerly been impressed upon the previous balances to the credit of that account. No doubt, Mr. Hansell did say “No. I am only asking you to treat the account as a whole, and to consider the balance from time to time standing to the credit of that account as subject to one continual charge or trust.” But I think that really is using words which are not appropriate to the facts. You must, for the purpose of tracing, which was the process adopted in In re Hallett's Estate, put your finger on some definite fund which either remains in its original state or can be found in another shape. That is tracing, and tracing, by the very facts of this case, seems to be absolutely excluded except as to the 25l. 18s.

Then, apart from tracing, it seems to me possible to establish this claim against the ultimate balance of 358l. 5s. 5d. only by saying that something was done, with regard to the additional moneys which are needed to make up that balance, by the person to whom those moneys belonged, the debtor, to substitute those moneys for the purpose of, or to impose upon those moneys a trust equivalent to, the trust which rested on the previous balance. Of course, if there was anything like a separate trust account, the payment of the further moneys into that account would, in itself, have been quite a sufficient indication of the intention of the debtor to substitute those additional moneys for the original trust moneys, and accordingly to impose, by way of substitution, the old trusts upon those additional moneys. But, in a case where the account into which the moneys are paid is the general trading account of the debtor on which he has been accustomed to draw both in the ordinary course and in breach of trust when there were trust funds standing to the credit of that account which were convenient for that purpose, I think it is impossible to attribute to him that by the mere payment into the account of further moneys, which to a large extent he subsequently used for purposes of his own, he intended to clothe those moneys with a trust in favour of the plaintiffs.

Certainly, after having heard In re Hallett's Estate stated over and over again, I should have thought that the general view of that decision was that it only applied to such an amount of the balance ultimately standing to the credit of the trustee as did not exceed the lowest balance of the account during the intervening period. That view has practically been taken, as far as I can make out, in the cases which have dealt with In re Hallett's Estate. Re Oatway, a decision of Joyce J., was cited to me in support of the plaintiffs' case, but I do not find anything in it to help them. All that Joyce J. did in that case was to say that, if part of the mixed moneys can be traced into a definite security, that security will not become freed from the charge in *70 favour of the trust, but will, together with any residue of the mixed moneys, remain subject to that charge. I am sure that nothing which he said was intended to mean that the trust was imposed upon any property into which the original fund could not be traced. The head-note to the decision of North J. in In re Stenning (which accurately represents the effect of the case) is stated in such terms as to indicate that the application of the doctrine in In re Hallett's Estate implied that there should be a continuous balance standing to the credit of the account equal to the balance against which the charge is sought to be enforced. And certainly in the recent case of Sinclair v Brougham I can see nothing in any way to impeach the doctrine as to tracing laid down in In re Hallett's Estate.

In my opinion, therefore, the only part of the balance of 358l. 5s. 5d. which can be made available by the plaintiffs is the sum of 25l. 18s., being the smallest amount to which the balance, to the credit of the account had fallen between May 19, 1913, and the death of the debtor.

== See also ==
- English trusts law
- Turner v Jacob [2006] EWHC 1317 (Ch), [2008] WTLR 307, Patten J held the Re Hallett presumption of a trustee spending his own money first applies where there are sufficient funds left over in a bank account to satisfy a claim by a beneficiary.
- Shalson v Russo, [144] suggested the beneficiary can cherry pick whichever is more favourable, as for physical mixtures.
- Foskett v McKeown, para 132, Lord Millett also.
