= Percy Hartill =

The Ven. Percy Hartill (10 February 1892 in Willenhall – 2 December 1964 in Newent) was an Anglican priest and author.

Hartill was educated at New College, Oxford and Ripon College Cuddesdon. He was ordained deacon in 1916 and priest in 1917. After a curacy at Christ Church, West Bromwich he was domestic chaplain to the Bishop of Lichfield, and a lecturer at Lichfield Theological College. He was vicar and rural dean of West Bromwich from 1930 to 1935; examining chaplain to the bishop of Lichfield from 1930 to 1955; proctor in Convocation for Diocese of Lichfield from 1931 to 1955; prebendary of Ufton Decani in Lichfield Cathedral from 1935 to 1956; and rector of Stoke Minster and the archdeacon of Stoke-on-Trent from 1935 to 1955. He was also president of the Anglican Pacifist Fellowship from 1939 until his death, and prolocutor of the Lower House of Convocation of Canterbury from 1955 to 1956.

Church of England titles
Preceded by Douglas Henry Crick	Archdeacon of Stoke; 1935–55	Succeeded by George Youell
