= Re Oatway =

- Court: High Court
- Citation: [1903] Ch 356

Keywords
- Tracing

Re Oatway [1903] 2 Ch 356 is an English trusts law case, concerning tracing.

== Facts ==
Mr Oatway was a trustee of Charles Skipper’s will. He took £3000 of trust money and mixed it with £4000 of his own. He used £2137 from the fund to buy shares in the Oceana Company, and dissipated the rest. Then he died. The beneficiaries of the Skipper trust wished to trace their money into the £2475 that were the proceeds of the shares.

== Judgment ==
Joyce J held the beneficiaries could claim the proceeds of the shares. A trustee cannot say the purchased assets were not bought with trust money.

It is a principle settled as far back as the time of the Year Books that, whatever alteration of form any property may undergo, the true owner is entitled to seize it in its new shape if he can prove the identity of the original material: see Blackstone, vo ii, p 405 and Lupton v White (1808) 15 Ves 432... [It is...] equally clear that when any of the money drawn out has been invested, and the investment remains in the name or under the control of the trustee, the rest of the balance having been afterwards dissipated by him, he cannot maintain that the investment which remains represents his own money alone, and that what has been spent and can no longer be traced and recovered was the money belonging to the trust.

This was just as true as that a trustee cannot rely on Clayton’s case to say that it was the beneficiary’s money taken out first and spent.

== See also ==
- English trusts law
- Turner v Jacob [2006] EWHC 1317 (Ch), [2008] WTLR 307, Patten J held the Re Hallett presumption of a trustee spending his own money first applies where there are sufficient funds left over in a bank account to satisfy a claim by a beneficiary.
- Shalson v Russo [2003] EWHC 1637, [144] suggested the beneficiary can cherry pick whichever is more favourable, as for physical mixtures.
- Foskett v McKeown, para 132, Lord Millett also.
