= Malcolm Graham =

Malcolm Graham may refer to:

- Malcolm Graham (footballer) (1934–2015), English footballer who played for Barnsley and Leyton Orient
- Malcolm Graham (politician) (born 1963), Democratic member of the North Carolina senate
- Malcolm Graham (arms dealer) (1832–1899) of Schuyler, Hartley and Graham
- Malcolm Graham (priest) (1849–1931), Archdeacon of Stoke
- Malcolm D. Graham (1827–1878), Confederate politician
- Malcolm Graham (bowls), Scottish lawn bowler
