= Archdeacon of Stoke =

Church of England ecclesiastical office

The Archdeacon of Stoke ("Archdeacon of Stoke-upon-Trent" in full and often rendered "Archdeacon of Stoke-on-Trent") is a senior ecclesiastical officer within the Church of England Diocese of Lichfield. The archdeaconry was created on 24 July 1877 from the archdeaconry of Stafford.

The Archdeacon, under the supervision of the Bishop of Stafford, is responsible for the disciplinary supervision of the clergy within the area deaneries: Cheadle, Eccleshall, Leek, Newcastle-under-Lyme, Stafford, Stoke-upon-Trent, Stoke North, Stone (formerly Trentham), Tutbury and Uttoxeter.

== List of archdeacons ==
- 1877–1888 (res.): Sir Lovelace Stamer, 3rd Baronet, Rector of Stoke and first archdeacon (became Bishop suffragan of Shrewsbury)
- 1888–1904 (res.): Ernald Lane, Rector of Leigh (became Dean of Rochester)
- 1905–1908 (res.): Herbert Crump
- 1908–2 December 1931 (d.): Malcolm Graham, Vicar of Trentham
- 1932–1935 (res.): Douglas Crick, Rector of Stoke (also Bishop suffragan of Stafford from 1934)
- 1935–1955 (ret.): Percy Hartill, Rector of Stoke (afterwards archdeacon emeritus)
- 1956–1970 (res.): George Youell, Vicar of Leek (until 1961) then of Horton
- 1971–1982 (ret.): Charles Borrett (also priest-in-charge of Sandon from 1975; afterwards archdeacon emeritus)
- 1982–1990 (ret.): John Delight (afterwards archdeacon emeritus)
- 1989–1997 (ret.): Dennis Ede (afterwards archdeacon emeritus)
- 1997–2001 (res.): Alan Smith (became Bishop suffragan of Shrewsbury)
- 2002–2013 (ret.): Godfrey Stone
- 10 September 2013 – 31 October 2020: Matthew Parker (appointed area Bishop of Stafford)
- 1 November 2020 – 2021 (Acting): Alistair Magowan
- 3 October 2021 – present: Megan Smith
