= Re Yeovil Glove Co Ltd =

UK insolvency law case

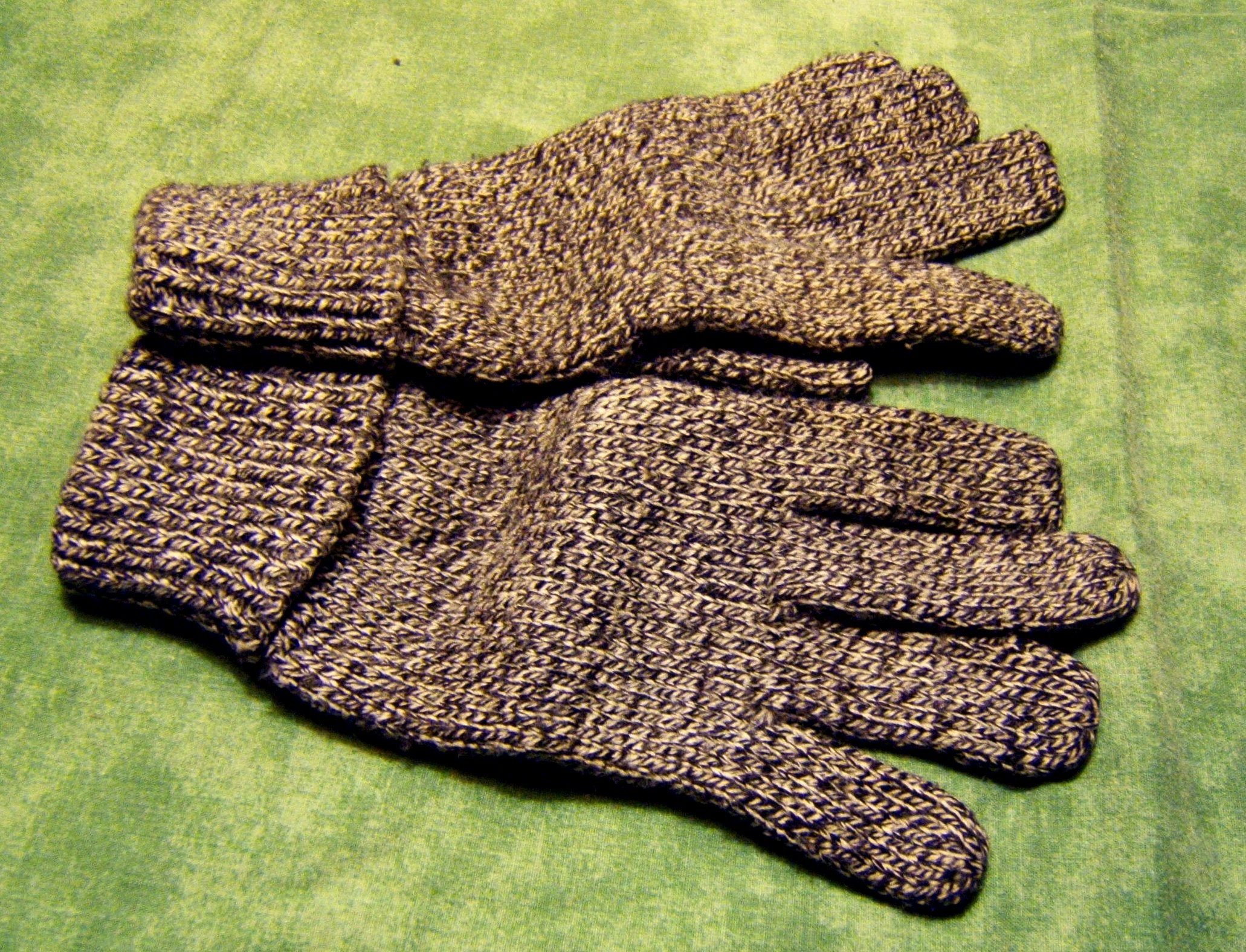
- Court: High Court
- Citation: [1965] Ch 148

Court membership
- Judges sitting: Willmer LJ; Harman LJ; Russell LJ

Keywords
- Voidable preference, undervalue transaction

Re Yeovil Glove Co Ltd [1965] Ch 148 is a leading UK insolvency law case, concerning voidable floating charges for past value. It holds that a floating charge can harden (or crystallise) when it secures a debt in an overdraft account, when the bank keeps the facility open as a company takes money out and puts money in.

== Facts ==
The liquidator of Yeovil Glove Co Ltd, a glove manufacturer in Yeovil, sued National Provincial Bank to rescind a floating charge taken within 12 months before insolvency. The bank's floating charge was to secure Yeovil Glove's overdraft, which (on top of debts of £94,000 to other unsecured creditors) had grown to £67,000 when the bank took fixed security and then as money was still unpaid, a floating charge. Over the next year, Yeovil Glove paid £111,000 and drew out (through cheques written to other people that the bank was honouring) £110,000. At the time the Insolvency Act 1986, section 245 (formerly Companies Act 1948, section 322) read that a floating charge was voidable ‘except to the amount of any cash paid to the company at the time of or subsequently to the creation of, and in consideration for, the charge.’ The bank argued that because more money had been paid out of the account than was covered by the charge (albeit that new debts were run up) the charge was not voidable. As in Clayton's case, money going into an account is presumed to discharge the last debt first. So money had been advanced to the company to a greater extent than the charge, and the turnover of money converted the old value given into new value.

Plowman J held that the ability to make drawings after was good consideration for the charge.

== Judgment ==
Harman LJ noted the liquidator’s argument, that because no cash or promise to pay cash was made when the debenture was made, there was no consideration except the bank’s immediate forbearance. But he held that the act of the bank in meeting the company’s cheques was equivalent to money given, relying partly on a decision by Romer J in Re Thomas Mortimer Ltd. By the rule in Clayton’s case, the bank could claim the whole £67,000 was cash advanced subsequently to the creation of the charge, so the security was valid. His judgment went as follows

The figures are worked out in the judgment of Russell L.J. about to be delivered, from which I no not differ, but in whatever way the figures are dealt with it follows, if the decision in In re Thomas Mortimer Ltd be right, that there is admittedly nothing left for the unsecured creditors. In my judgment Romer J.'s decision was right, and was rightly followed by Plowman J. in the present case.

The fallacy in the appellant's argument lies, in my opinion, in the theory that, because the company's payments in to the bank after the date of the charge were more or less equal to the payments out by the bank during the same period, no "new money" was provided by the bank. This is not the fact. Every such payment was in fact new money having regard to the state of the company's accounts, and it was in fact used to pay the company's creditors. Indebtedness remained approximately at the same level because this was the limit set by the bank to the company's overdraft. I can find no reason to compel the bank to treat all payments in after the charge as devoted to post-charge indebtedness. The law is in fact the other way. To cite again from the judgment of Romer J., with which I agree, he said: "Now I come to the last point of all; that is, as to whether this cash which was paid to the company by the bank to the amount of £51,000 has ever been repaid by the company to the bank. It is said that it has to the extent of £41,311, because admittedly the company has paid to the bank by way of cheques, and perhaps of cash, and so forth, that sum of money after the date of the debenture.

Now if nothing else had been owing by the company but the sums from time to time advanced and paid by the bank on behalf of the company in cash after the date of the debenture then, of course, this £41,000 would have been applied in reduction of that amount and as repayment of that amount, but this seems to me a case of payment by a debtor to his creditor to whom either two debts are owing or to whom one debt is owing, part of which is secured and part of which is unsecured. Now that being so, as I understand the general law, it is open to the creditor to appropriate the payment made by his debtor to any part of the debt he likes, or to whichever of two debts, if there were two debts, that he prefers if the debtor himself in making the payment has not directed an appropriation; furthermore, as I understand the law, in cases between bankers and customers, or where there is a current account between parties into which moneys are from time to time paid, and from which moneys are from time to time withdrawn, in the absence of any express appropriation the creditor is presumed to appropriate payments into the accounts made by his customer in discharge of the earliest entries on the other side of the account."

A further argument was addressed to us by Mr. Arnold to the effect that, even if we did not agree with it, we ought to follow In re Thomas Mortimer Ltd either on the principle of stare decisis or on the analogous principle that, as the words of section 212 of the Companies (Consolidation) Act, 1908, have twice been re-enacted by Parliament in the Companies Acts of 1929 and 1948, the legislature must be supposed to have so enacted in accordance with the meaning attributed to those words as laid down by Romer J. in 1925. This, in the circumstances, does not arise, for as I have said I agree with Romer J.'s decision. The point is dealt with in detail by Willmer L.J. All I propose to say is that if I had disagreed with Romer J.'s view of the true meaning of the words, I should not have been deterred from differing from him on either of the principles mentioned.

== See also ==
- UK insolvency law
