= Devaynes v Noble =

1816 legal case

Clayton's case
- Court: Court of Chancery
- Decided: 9 March 1816
- Citation: (1816) 35 ER 767, 781; (1816) 1 Mer 529, 572

Case opinions
- Sir William Grant MR

Keywords
- First in, first out, tracing

Devaynes v Noble (1816) 35 ER 781, best known for the claim contained in Clayton's case, created a rule, or more precisely common law presumption, in relation to the distribution of money from a bank account. The rule is based upon the deceptively simple notion of first-in, first-out to determine the effect of payments from an account, and normally applies in English Law in the absence of evidence of any other intention. Payments are presumed to be appropriated to debts in the order in which the debts are incurred.

== Facts ==
Mr. Clayton had an account with a banking firm, Devaynes, Dawes, Noble, and Co, that was a partnership rather than a joint stock company as modern banks almost always are. The bank's partners were therefore personally liable for the debts of the bank. One of the partners, William Devaynes, died in 1809. The amount then due to Clayton was £1,717. After Mr. Devaynes' death, Clayton made further deposits with the bank and the surviving partners paid out to Mr. Clayton more than the £1,717 on deposit at the time of Mr. Devaynes' death. The firm went bankrupt in 1810.

== Judgment ==
Sir William Grant, Master of the Rolls, held that the estate of the deceased partner was not liable to Clayton, as the payments made by the surviving partners to Clayton must be regarded as having completely discharged the liability of the firm to Clayton as it had stood the time of Devaynes' death. Subsequent payments into the account by Clayton were therefore made to the surviving partners only.

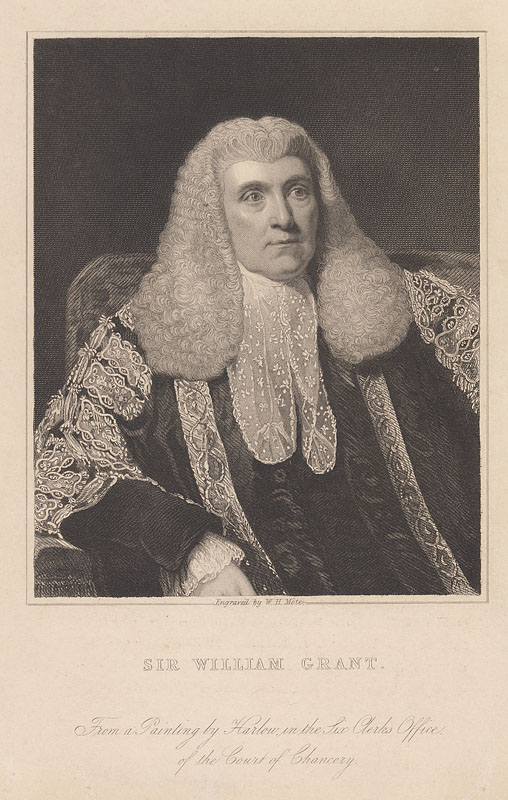
Sir William Grant.

It appears to me that this transaction stands quite detached from any other, and may be decided by itself. The exchequer bills having been sold in Mr. Devaynes's lifetime, contrary to the duty reposed in the partnership, and the money having been received by the partnership, the amount became a partnership debt, whether the individual partners were, or were not, privy to the sale. The debt accrued at the moment that the sale was made, and not at the time when the subsequent representation was given to Mr. Clayton, with respect to the re-investment of the money in other exchequer bills. How a falsehood told by the four could do away a previous breach of trust which had been committed by the five, I cannot comprehend. More than a breach of trust, I do not see how it can be reckoned. It was attempted to argue that it was a felony; but, in order to make the subsequent conversion of property, of which the possession has been delivered, amount to a criminal charge, it is necessary to shew that the animus furandi existed at the moment when the delivery was made. Taking this, therefore, to be a debt, as Mr. Clayton was altogether ignorant of its existence, he could not, by any subsequent dealings with the other partners, transfer it to their credit.

The notice, whatever operation it may have in any other question as between Mr. Clayton and the surviving partners, can have none in this case, in which lie was ignorant that any such sum of money was in their hands. He was willing to trust them with the care of his exchequer bills; but, whether he would transfer to them exclusively the liability, which all had incurred, of answering for the produce of the sale, was a matter upon which he never had an opportunity of exercising any choice. For the same reason, none of the payments that were subsequently made, could operate in extinction of this debt. Mr. Clayton could not draw upon the credit of a fund which he did not know to exist; and, whatever question may arise as to the manner in which the payments are to be imputed, to the old or to the new cash balances, they must be imputed to acknowledged cash balances, of the one or the other description, and not to the produce of securities which the one party represented, and the other believed, to be still remaining in specie.

I am, therefore, of opinion that this exception must be over-ruled.

[Counsel submitted further arguments...]

Though the Report, following (I presume) the words of the inquiry directed by the Decree, states the Master's opinion to be that Mr. Clayton has, by his dealings and transactions with the surviving partners, subsequent to the death of Mr. Devaynes, released his estate from the payment of the cash balance of £1713, yet the ground of that opinion is, not that the acts done amount constructively to an exoneration of Mr. Devaynes's estate, but that the balance due at his death has been actually paid off,—and, consequently, that the claim now made is an attempt to revive a debt that has once been completely extinguished.

To a certain extent, it has been admitted at the bar, that such would be the effect of the claim made before the Master, and insisted upon by the exception. To that extent it is, therefore, very properly abandoned; and all that is claimed is the sum to which the debt had at one time been reduced.

It would, indeed, be impossible to contend that, after the balance, for which alone Mr. Devaynes was liable, had once been diminished to any given amount, it could, as against his estate, be again augmented, by subsequent payments made, or subsequent credit given, to the surviving partners. On the part of Mr. Devaynes's representatives, however, it is denied that any portion of the debt due at his death now remains unsatisfied. That depends on the manner in which the payments made by the house are to be considered as having been applied. In all, they have paid much more than would be sufficient to discharge the balance due at Devaynes's death;—and it is only by applying the payments to subsequent debts, that any part of that balance will remain unpaid.

This state of the case has given rise to much discussion, as to the rules by which the application of indefinite payments is to be governed. Those rules we, probably, borrowed in the first instance, from the civil law. The leading rule, with regard to the option given, in the first place to the debtor, and to the creditor in the second, we have taken literally from thence. But, according to that law, the election was to be made at the time of payment, as well in the case of the creditor, as in that of the debtor, “in re præsenti; hoc est statim atque solutum est:—cæterum, postea non permittitur.” (Dig. Lib. 46, tit. 3, Qu. 1, 3.) If neither applied the payment, the law made the appropriation according to certain rules of presumption, depending on the nature of the debts, or the priority in which they were incurred. And, as it was the actual intention of the debtor that would, in the first instance, have governed; so it was his presumable intention that was first resorted to as the rule by which the application was to be determined. In the absence, therefore, of any express declaration by either, the inquiry was, what application would be most beneficial to the debtor. The payment was, consequently, applied to the most burthensome debt,—to one that carried interest, rather than to that which carried none,—to one secured by a penalty, rather than to that which rested on a simple stipulation;—and, if the debts were equal, then to that which had been first contracted. “In his quæ præsenti die debentur, constat, quotiens indistincte quid solvitur, in graviorem causam videri solutum. Si autem nulla prægravet,—id est, si omnia nomina similia fuerint,—in antiquiorem.” (Dig. L. 46, t. 3, Qu. 5.)

But it has been contended that, in this respect, our Courts have entirely reversed the principle of decision, and that, in the absence of express appropriation by either party, it is the presumed intention of the creditor that is to govern; or, at least, that the creditor may, at any time, elect how the payments made to him shall retrospectively receive their application. There is, certainly, a great deal of authority for this doctrine. With some shades of distinction, it is sanctioned by the case of Goddard v Cox (2 Stra. 1194); by Wilkinson v Sterne (9 Mod. 427); by the ruling of the Lord Chief Baron in Newmarch v Clay (14 East, 239); and by Peters v Anderson (5 Taunt. 596), in the Common Pleas. From these cases, I should collect, that a proposition which, in one sense of it, is indisputably true,— namely, that, if the debtor does [607] not apply the payment, the creditor may make the application to what debt he pleases,—has been extended much beyond its original meaning, so as, in general, to authorise the creditor to make his election when he thinks fit, instead of confining it to the period of payment, and allowing the rules of law to operate where no express declaration is then made.

There are, however, other cases which are irreconcileable with this indefinite right of election in the creditor, and which seem, on the contrary, to imply a recognition of the civil law principle of decision. Such are, in particular, the cases of Meggott v Mills (Ld. Raym. 287), and Dowe v Holdsworth (Peake, N. P. 64). The creditor, in each of these cases, elected, ex post facto, to apply the payment to the last debt. It was, in each case, held incompetent for him so to do. There are but two grounds on which these decisions could proceed;—either that the application was to be made to the oldest debt, or that it was to be made to the debt which it was most for the interest of the debtor to discharge. Either way, the decision would agree with the rule of the civil law, which is, that if the debts are equal, the payment is to be applied to the first in point of time—if one be more burthensome, or more penal, than another, it is to it that the payment shall be first imputed. A debt on which a man could be made a bankrupt, would undoubtedly fall within this rule.

The Lord Chief Justice of the Common Pleas explains the ground and reason of the case of Dowe v. Holdsworth in precise conformity to the principle of the civil law.

The cases then set up two conflicting rules;—the presumed intention of the debtor, which, in some instances at least, is to govern,—and the ex post facto election of the creditor, which, in other instances, is to prevail. I should, therefore, feel myself a good deal embarrassed, if the general question, of the creditor's right to make the application of indefinite payments, were now necessarily to be determined. But I think the present case is distinguishable from any of those in which that point has been decided in the creditor's favour. They were all cases of distinct insulated debts, between which a plain line of separation could be drawn. But this is the case of a banking account, where all the sums paid in form one blended fund, the parts of which have no longer any distinct existence. Neither banker nor customer ever thinks of saying, this draft is to be placed to the account of the £500 paid in on Monday, and this other to the account of the £500 paid in on Tuesday. There is a fund of £1000 to draw upon, and that is enough. In such a case, there is no room for any other appropriation than that which arises from the order in which the receipts and payments take place, and are carried into the account. Presumably, it is the sum first paid in, that is first drawn out. It is the first item on the debit side of the account, that is discharged, or reduced, by the first item on the credit side. The appropriation is made by the very act of setting the two items against each other. Upon that principle, all accounts current are settled, and particularly cash accounts. When there has been a continuation of dealings, in what way can it be ascertained whether the specific balance due on a given day has, or has not, been discharged, but by examining whether payments to the amount of that balance appear by the account to have been made? [609] You are not to take the account backwards, and strike the balance at the head, instead of the foot, of it. A man's banker breaks, owing him, on the whole account, a balance of £1000. It would surprise one to hear the customer say, “I have been fortunate enough to draw out all that I paid in during the last four years; but there is £1000, which I paid in five years ago, that I hold myself never to have drawn out; and, therefore, if I can find any body who was answerable for the debts of the banking-house, such as they stood five years ago, I have a right to say that it is that specific sum which is still due to me, and not the £1000 that I paid in last week.” This is exactly the nature of the present claim. Mr. Clayton travels back into the account, till he finds a balance, for which Mr. Devaynes was responsible; and then he says,—“That is a sum which I have never drawn for. Though standing in the centre of the account, it is to be considered as set apart, and left untouched. Sums above it, and below it, have been drawn out; but none of my drafts ever reached or affected this remnant of the balance due to me at Mr. Devaynes's death.” What boundary would there be to this method of re-moulding an account? If the interest of the creditor required it, he might just as well go still further back, and arbitrarily single out any balance, as it stood at any time, and say, it is the identical balance of that day which still remains due to him. Suppose there had been a former partner, who had died three years before Mr. Devaynes-What would hinder Mr. Clayton from saying, “Let us see what the balance was at his death?— I have a right to say, it still remains due to me, and his representatives are answer— able for it; for, if you examine the accounts, you will find I have always had cash enough lying in the house to answer my subsequent drafts; and, therefore, all the payments made to me in Devaynes's lifetime, and since his death, I will now impute to the sums I paid in during that period,—the effect of which will be, to leave the balance due at the death of the former partners still undischarged.”—I cannot think, that any of the cases sanction such an extravagant claim on the part of a creditor.

If appropriation be required, here is appropriation in the only way that the nature of the thing admits. Here are payments, so placed in opposition to debts, that, on the ordinary principles on which accounts are settled, this debt is extinguished.

If the usual course of dealing was, for any reason, to be inverted, it was surely incumbent on the creditor to signify that such was his intention. He should either have said to the bankers,—“Leave this balance altogether out of the running account between us,”—or,—“Always enter your payments as made on the credit of your latest receipts, so as that the oldest balance may be the last paid.” Instead of this, he receives the account drawn out, as one unbroken running account. He makes no objection to it,—and the report states that the silence of the customer after the receipt of his banking account is regarded as an admission of its being correct.

Both debtor and creditor must, therefore, be considered as having concurred in the appropriation.

But there is this peculiarity in the case,—that it is, not only by inference from the nature of the dealings and the mode of keeping the account, that we are entitled to ascribe the drafts or payments to this balance, but there is distinct and positive evidence that Mr. Clayton considered, and treated, the balance as a fund, out of which, notwithstanding Devaynes's death, his drafts were to continue to be paid. For he drew, and that to a considerable extent, when there was no fund, except this balance, out of which his drafts could be answered. What was there, in the next draft he drew, which could indicate that it was not to be paid out of the residue of the same fund, but was to be considered as drawn exclusively on the credit of money more recently paid in? No such distinction was made; nor was there any thing from which it could be inferred. I should, therefore say, that, on Mr. Clayton's express authority, the fund was applied in payment of his drafts in the order in which they were presented. But, even independently of this circumstance, I am of opinion, on the grounds I have before stated, that the Master has rightly found that the payments were to be imputed to the balance due at Mr. Devaynes's death, and that such balance has, by those payments, been fully discharged.

The Exception must, therefore, be over-ruled.

== Significance ==
The rule was based on the principle that, if an account is in credit, the first sum paid in will also be the first to be drawn out and, if the account is overdrawn, the first sum paid in is allocated to the earliest debit on the account which caused the account to be overdrawn. It is generally applicable in cases of running accounts between two parties, e.g., a banker and a customer, moneys being paid in and withdrawn from time to time from the account, without any specific indication as to which payment out was in respect of which payment in.

It is easier to see the reason for the rule if one remembers that a deposit with a bank is a liability of the bank to the customer, and an overdraft is a liability of the customer to the bank. The first sum paid into an account is the first loan by the customer to the bank, with subsequent deposits being subsequent loans. When the customer withdraws from the account, this is a repayment by the bank of its liability. The underlying principle for the rule is therefore that, absent any contrary agreement between a debtor and their creditor, the oldest liability is the one discharged first.

In such case, when final accounts, which may run over several years, are made up, debits and credits will be set off against one another in order of their dates, leaving only a final balance to be recovered from the debtor by the creditor.

The rule is only a presumption, and can be displaced. The rule is one of convenience and may be displaced by circumstances or by agreement. In Commerzbank Aktiengesellschaft v IMB Morgan plc and others [2004] EWHC 2771 (Ch), the court elected to not apply the rule on the fact of the case (sums held in bank accounts derived from victims of Nigerian advance fee frauds).

Notwithstanding the criticisms sometimes levelled against it, and despite its antiquity, the rule is commonly applied in relation to tracing claims where a fraudster has commingled unlawfully obtained funds from various sources.

=== Exception to the rule ===
The rule does not apply to payments made by a fiduciary out of an account which contains a mixture of trust funds and the fiduciary's personal money. In such a case, if the trustee misappropriates any moneys belonging to the trust, the first amount so withdrawn by him will not be allocated to the discharge of his funds held on trust but towards the discharge of his own personal deposits, even if such deposits were in fact made later in order of time. In such cases, the fiduciary is presumed to spend their own money first before misappropriating money from the trust; see Re Hallett's Estate (1879) 13 Ch D 696. The rule is founded on the principles of equity. If a fiduciary has mixed his or her own money with sums of trust money in a private account, withdrawals are attributed to his or her own money as far as possible, Re MacDonald [1975] Qd R 255. However, if the funds of two beneficiaries, or of a beneficiary and an innocent volunteer, are mixed the rule determines their respective entitlements, Re Diplock.

=== Applications to a partnership ===
The rule has special application in relation to partnerships upon the death of a partner. In most jurisdictions, the death of a partner ordinarily has the legal effect of dissolution. The partners' personal representatives have no right to step into the partner's shoes; they cannot take part in its management; they can only claim the deceased partner's share in the assets of the firm. The banker, who provides financial accommodation to the firm, can have no objection in continuing the account; the bank can presume that the surviving partners will account to the representatives of the deceased for his share in the assets. Where the firm has a debit balance, the account should be stopped to fix the liability of the estate of the deceased partner and to avoid the operation of the rule in Clayton's case.

=== Application in security ===
Where an overdraft or other running account is secured by a charge, guarantee, or similar, the result can be that the account becomes unsecured to the extent that repayments decrease the debit balance. For example, if an overdraft of 1000 is secured, and repayments take the balance to 400, the borrower's subsequent drawing on the remaining 600 of the facility will not be secured, as it is considered a new loan. Payments into the account are applied first to the earliest overdrawing, and so they discharge that earlier liability.

Security agreements therefore almost invariably provide for the rule to be contracted out of.

== See also ==
- English trusts law
- Tracing in English law
- UK company law
