= Stephen Waine =

British Anglican priest

The Very Reverend Stephen Waine
- Dean of Exeter
- Diocese: Diocese of Exeter
- In office: 1 August 2026 — Incumbent
- Predecessor: Jonathan Greener
- Other posts: Dean of Chichester (2015–2023); Archdeacon of Dorset (2010–2015); Vicar of the Piddle Valley, Hilton, Cheselbourne and Melcombe Horsey (2023–2026)

Orders
- Ordination: 1984 (deacon) by John Waine (deacon)

Personal details
- Born: Stephen John Waine; 23 May 1959 (age 67)
- Denomination: Anglicanism
- Parents: John Waine
- Education: University of East Anglia

Stephen John Waine (born 23 May 1959) is a British Anglican priest who has served as the 72nd Dean of Exeter since 1 August 2026. He was the Dean of Chichester from February 2015 to April 2023.

== Early life ==
Waine was born on 23 May 1959, son of John Waine, later Bishop of Stafford, of St Edmundsbury and Ipswich and of Chelmsford. He studied economic and social studies at the University of East Anglia and graduated with a Bachelor of Arts (BA) in 1980. He then trained for the priesthood at Westcott House, Cambridge.

== Ordained ministry ==
Waine was made a deacon at Petertide 1984 (1 July) by his father, the Bishop of St Edmundsbury and Ipswich, at St Edmundsbury Cathedral (by letters dimissory from the vacant See of Lichfield). He was ordained a Church of England priest the next year, 1985. He then served his curacy at St Peter's Church, Wolverhampton. He was Succentor at St Paul's Cathedral from 1988 to 1993. After this, he was Vicar of St Edward the Confessor Church, Romford. In 2010, he was appointed Archdeacon of Dorset.

In November 2014 it was announced that he would succeed Nicholas Frayling as Dean of Chichester. He took up the post in February 2015: he was instituted on 14 February. He left the Deanery when he was inducted as Vicar of the Piddle Valley, Hilton, Cheselbourne and Melcombe Horsey in the Diocese of Salisbury on 1 April 2023.

In March 2026, following the announcement of Jonathan Greener’s retirement as Dean of Exeter, Stephen Waine was appointed Interim Dean by the Diocesan Bishop and formally assumed the role on 1 August 2026.
