= George Youell =

The Ven. George Youell (23 December 1910 - 21 January 1995) was Archdeacon of Stoke-on-Trent from 1956 to 1970.

Harthill was educated at Hartley Victoria College, the University of Keele and St Stephen's House, Oxford. He was ordained deacon in 1933, and priest in 1934. After a curacy at St John, Chester, 1933 he was Clerical Director of the Industrial Christian Fellowship. During World War II he was a Chaplain with the Guards Armoured Division. When peace returned he held incumbencies at Ightfield, Calverhall and Leek. After his years as Archdeacon he was a Canon Residentiary at Ely Cathedral, serving until his retirement in 1981.

Church of England titles
Preceded by Percy Hartill	Archdeacon of Stoke-on-Trent; 1956–1970	Succeeded by Charles Walter Borrett
