= Foskett v McKeown =

2000 UK legal case

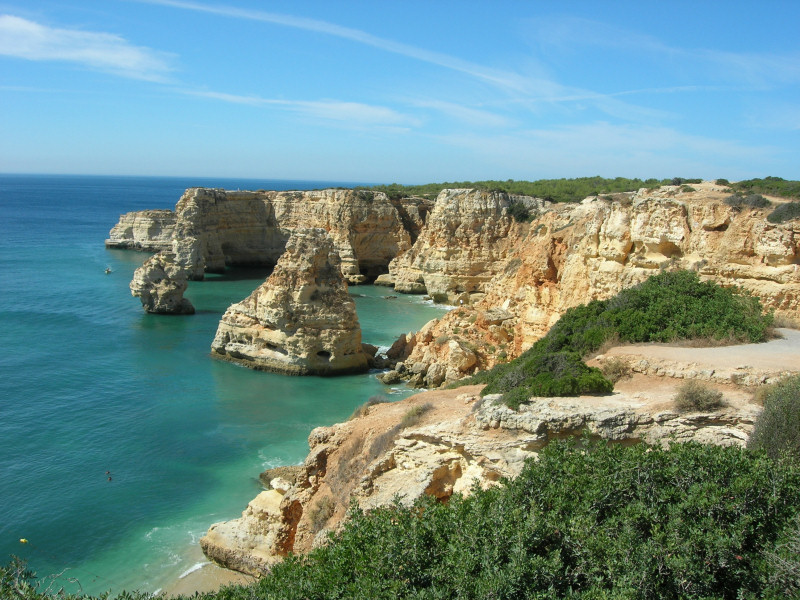
- The Algarve coastline
- Court: House of Lords
- Full case name: FOSKETT (SUING ON HIS OWN BEHALF AND ON BEHALF OF ALL OTHER PURCHASERS OF PLOTS OF LAND AT MOUNT EDEN, HERRADODO CERRO ALTO DIOGO, MARTINS, ALGARVE, PORTUGAL) (ORIGINAL APPELLANT AND CROSS-RESPONDENT) v. MCKEOWN (ORIGINAL RESPONDENT) AND OTHERS (A.P.) (ORIGINAL RESPONDENTS AND CROSS-APPELLANTS)
- Decided: 18 May 2000
- Citations: [2000] UKHL 29, [2001] 1 AC 102

Court membership
- Judges sitting: Lord Browne-Wilkinson, Lord Hoffmann, Lord Steyn, Lord Hope, Lord Millett

Keywords
- Tracing, vindication

Foskett v McKeown [2000] UKHL 29 is a leading case on the English law of trusts, concerning tracing and the availability of proprietary relief following a breach of trust.

== Facts ==
In breach of trust, Mr Murphy took £20,440 from a company he controlled. Over 200 investors (including one Mr Foskett) had invested in the company for the purpose of buying land in the Algarve, Portugal. The land had been bought, but not developed as promised.

Mr Murphy used the trust money to pay off the fourth and fifth instalments on his life insurance policy. He had already paid the first two or three premiums with his own money.

Mr Murphy committed suicide. His children (the defendants) were paid the £1,000,000 under the insurance policy. Mr Foskett and the other investors (the claimants) sued the defendants, claiming a 40% share in the policy monies.

The claimants argued they had a proprietary interest in the insurance monies: the insurance policy had been purchased using a proportion of misapplied trust funds. The defendants argued that only an equitable lien was available, and the beneficiaries should only receive the amount taken.

== Judgments ==
=== Court of Appeal ===
The Court of Appeal held the Claimants could only get an equitable lien over the proceeds of the policy to secure the repayment of the fourth and fifth premiums. Sir Richard Scott VC suggested a beneficiary should get a share of the property's total value that was created by any expenditure deriving from trust property money. Hobhouse LJ gave a concurring judgment and Morritt LJ dissented.

=== House of Lords ===
The House of Lords held (Lord Steyn and Lord Hope dissenting) that the beneficiaries could claim a proprietary right over the insurance policy proceeds and J would get 35 and L would get 5%.

==== Lord Browne-Wilkinson ====
Lord Browne-Wilkinson gave the first speech, concurring with Lord Hoffmann and Lord Millett, suggesting the beneficiary can have a charge against property that was improved by paying the worker with trust money, unlike Re Diplock, whether or not expenditure increased the property value.

==== Lord Millett ====
Lord Millett, giving the leading judgment, held that this was a case concerning the vindication of property rights, not of unjust enrichment. The claimants could elect between (proportionate) beneficial ownership or an equitable lien, whichever was the most advantageous. One traces inherent value, and one set of tracing rules suffices. Just as if the trustee had taken money, bought a lottery ticket and won, it would be fair to take away the winnings without a change of position defence. Tracing is distinct from following, which is just locating the asset itself. He appeared to reject possibility of a change of position defence, because tracing claims were not based on unjust enrichment, rather on the simple vindication of property rights. He continued,

This is a textbook example of tracing through mixed substitutions. At the beginning of the story the plaintiffs were beneficially entitled under an express trust to a sum standing in the name of Mr. Murphy in a bank account. From there the money moved into and out of various bank accounts where in breach of trust it was inextricably mixed by Mr. Murphy with his own money. After each transaction was completed the plaintiffs' money formed an indistinguishable part of the balance standing to Mr. Murphy's credit in his bank account. The amount of that balance represented a debt due from the bank to Mr. Murphy, that is to say a chose in action. At the penultimate stage the plaintiffs' money was represented by an indistinguishable part of a different chose in action, viz. the debt prospectively and contingently due from an insurance company to its policyholders, being the trustees of a settlement made by Mr. Murphy for the benefit of his children. At the present and final stage it forms an indistinguishable part of the balance standing to the credit of the respondent trustees in their bank account.

Tracing and following The process of ascertaining what happened to the plaintiffs' money involves both tracing and following. These are both exercises in locating assets which are or may be taken to represent an asset belonging to the plaintiffs and to which they assert ownership. The processes of following and tracing are, however, distinct. Following is the process of following the same asset as it moves from hand to hand. Tracing is the process of identifying a new asset as the substitute for the old. Where one asset is exchanged for another, a claimant can elect whether to follow the original asset into the hands of the new owner or to trace its value into the new asset in the hands of the same owner. In practice his choice is often dictated by the circumstances. In the present case the plaintiffs do not seek to follow the money any further once it reached the bank or insurance company, since its identity was lost in the hands of the recipient (which in any case obtained an unassailable title as a bona fide purchaser for value without notice of the plaintiffs' beneficial interest). Instead the plaintiffs have chosen at each stage to trace the money into its proceeds, viz. the debt presently due from the bank to the account holder or the debt prospectively and contingently due from the insurance company to the policy holders.

Having completed this exercise, the plaintiffs claim a continuing beneficial interest in the insurance money. Since this represents the product of Mr. Murphy's own money as well as theirs, which Mr. Murphy mingled indistinguishably in a single chose in action, they claim a beneficial interest in a proportionate part of the money only. The transmission of a claimant's property rights from one asset to its traceable proceeds is part of our law of property, not of the law of unjust enrichment. There is no "unjust factor" to justify restitution (unless "want of title" be one, which makes the point). The claimant succeeds if at all by virtue of his own title, not to reverse unjust enrichment. Property rights are determined by fixed rules and settled principles. They are not discretionary. They do not depend upon ideas of what is "fair, just and reasonable." Such concepts, which in reality mask decisions of legal policy, have no place in the law of property.

[...]

The correct classification of the plaintiffs' cause of action may appear to be academic, but it has important consequences. The two causes of action have different requirements and may attract different defences.

A plaintiff who brings an action in unjust enrichment must show that the defendant has been enriched at the plaintiff's expense, for he cannot have been unjustly enriched if he has not been enriched at all. But the plaintiff is not concerned to show that the defendant is in receipt of property belonging beneficially to the plaintiff or its traceable proceeds. The fact that the beneficial ownership of the property has passed to the defendant provides no defence; indeed, it is usually the very fact which founds the claim. Conversely, a plaintiff who brings an action like the present must show that the defendant is in receipt of property which belongs beneficially to him or its traceable proceeds, but he need not show that the defendant has been enriched by its receipt. He may, for example, have paid full value for the property, but he is still required to disgorge it if he received it with notice of the plaintiff's interest.

Furthermore, a claim in unjust enrichment is subject to a change of position defence, which usually operates by reducing or extinguishing the element of enrichment. An action like the present is subject to the bona fide purchaser for value defence, which operates to clear the defendant's title.

Lord Millett added that claimant may elect whether to have a proportional share of the beneficial interest, or an equitable lien.

==== Lord Hoffmann ====
Lord Hoffmann gave a short speech concurring with Lord Millett.

I agree with him that this is a straightforward case of mixed substitution (what the Roman lawyers, if they had had an economy which required tracing through bank accounts, would have called confusio). I agree with his conclusion that Mr. Murphy's children, claiming through him, and the trust beneficiaries whose money he used, are entitled to share in the proceeds of the insurance policy in proportion to the value which they respectively contributed to the policy. This is not based upon unjust enrichment except in the most trivial sense of that expression. It is, as my noble and learned friend says, a vindication of proprietary right.

==== Lord Hope ====
Lord Hope gave a dissenting judgment, and would have held that only an amount to cover the premiums plus interest should have been available.

A profit was made on the investment. But the terms of the policy show that the amount which produced this profit had been fixed from the outset when the first premium was paid. It was attributable to the rights obtained by the life assured when he paid the first premium from his own money. No part of that sum was attributable to the value of the money taken from the purchasers to pay the additional premiums.

Lord Hope added that a claim formulated in terms of unjust enrichment would not be appropriate because the defendants were "innocent third parties to the unjust transactions between the life assured and the purchasers." It followed there was no causal link.

==== Lord Steyn ====
Lord Steyn gave a dissenting judgment, and would have held that only a lien was available.

== See also ==
- English law of trusts
- English law of unjust enrichment
- English law of restitution
- Rei vindicatio
