= Target Holdings Ltd v Redferns =

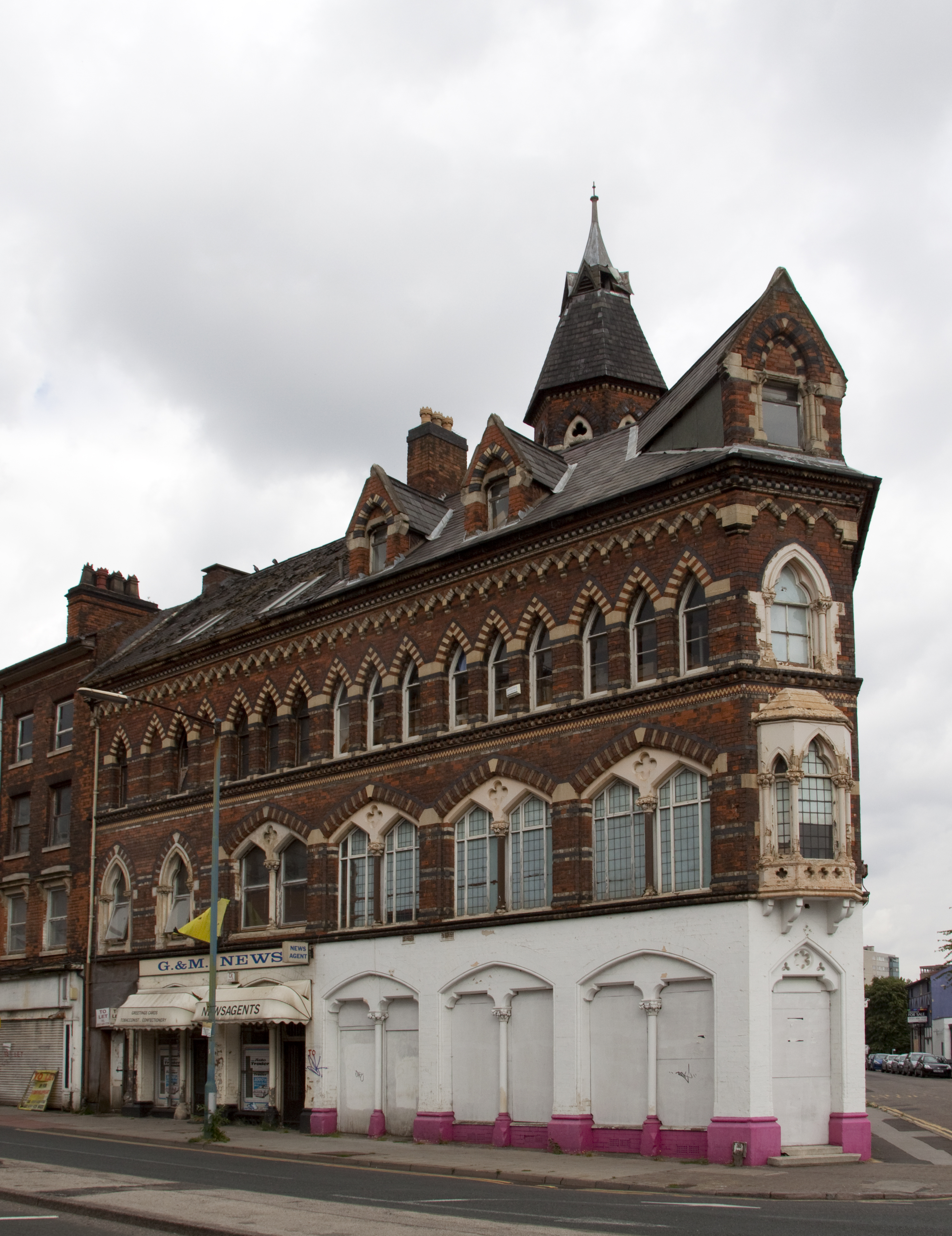
- Great Hampton St, Hockley
- Court: House of Lords
- Citations: [1995] UKHL 10, [1996] AC 421

Court membership
- Judges sitting: Lord Keith of Kinkel; Lord Ackner; Lord Jauncey of Tullichettle; Lord Browne-Wilkinson; Lord Lloyd of Berwick

Keywords
- Causation, breach of trust, compensation

Target Holdings Ltd v Redferns [1995] UKHL 10 is an English trusts law case, concerning the test for causation and the extent of compensation for breaches of trust.

== Facts ==
Target Holdings Ltd gave £1,525,000 to Redferns solicitors, ultimately to be loaned to Crowngate Developments Ltd to buy property at 60-64 Great Hampton Street, Hockley. Target Holdings Ltd would get a mortgage over the property that was bought, and Redferns were under instructions to not release the money until the purchase was completed, and the mortgage was executed. Until then, the solicitors were to hold the money on trust for Target Holdings Ltd. Crowngate, however, had orchestrated a scheme to make a fraudulent profit on the property which it was actually buying at £775,000, while reporting the purchase was for £2m. Breaching the terms of the agreement, Redferns in fact released £1,490,000 to a company called Panther Ltd before the purchase was completed. The sale went through, but the venture turned out to be a flop. Crowngate failed to repay the loan, and went into liquidation, meaning that Target Holdings Ltd only ever recovered £500,000 from the sale of the property. Target Holdings Ltd sued Redferns solicitors, arguing that it had a duty to account for the money it had wrongly paid away. Redferns argued that, even though it had breached the trust, this had nothing to do with the loss that Target Holdings Ltd had incurred. The loss was not caused by the breach.

Warner J held that Redferns breached its trust. In the Court of Appeal Hirst LJ and Peter Gibson LJ held that when Redferns misapplied the trust property, this generated an immediate liability as trustees to reconstitute the trust fund. That did not depend on showing that the loss would not have been suffered but for the breach. Ralph Gibson LJ dissented.

== Judgment ==
The House of Lords held that Redferns did not have to repay the £1,490,000, because the loss to the trust would have been the same. Only losses that were caused by Redfern's breach of the trust terms could be recovered. Although the test in the law of tort might differ, and allow remoteness limits or have dissimilar causation outcomes, some causal connection was needed between the fiduciary's breach of trust and the loss that resulted to the claimant. So because Redfern's payment away of the trust property early had nothing to do with the ultimate losses of Target Holdings Ltd, they were not liable to repay that money.

Lord Browne-Wilkinson gave the leading judgment.

At common law there are two principles fundamental to the award of damages. First, that the defendant's wrongful act must cause the damage complained of. Second, that the plaintiff is to be put "in the same position as he would have been in if he had not sustained the wrong for which he is now getting his compensation or reparation": Livingstone v Rawyards Coal Company (1880) 5 App Cas 25, 39. per Lord Blackburn. Although, as will appear, in many ways equity approaches liability for making good a breach of trust from a different starting point, in my judgment those two principles are applicable as much in equity as at common law. Under both systems liability is fault based: the defendant is only liable for the consequences of the legal wrong he has done to the plaintiff and to make good the damage caused by such wrong. He is not responsible for damage not caused by his wrong or to pay by way of compensation more than the loss suffered from such wrong. The detailed rules of equity as to causation and the quantification of loss differ, at least ostensibly, from those applicable at common law. But the principles underlying both systems are the same.’

[...]

The equitable rules of compensation for breach of trust have been largely developed in relation to such traditional trusts, where the only way in which all the beneficiaries' rights can be protected is to restore to the trust fund what ought to be there. In such a case the basic rule is that a trustee in breach of trust must restore or pay to the trust estate either the assets which have been lost to the estate by reason of the breach or compensation for such loss. Courts of Equity did not award damages but, acting in personam, ordered the defaulting trustee to restore the trust estate: see Nocton v Lord Ashburton [1914] AC 932, 952, 958, per Viscount Haldane LC If specific restitution of the trust property is not possible, then the liability of the trustee is to pay sufficient compensation to the trust estate to put it back to what it would have been had the breach not been committed: Caffrey v Darby (1801) 6 Ves. 488; Clough v Bond (1838) 3 My. and Cr. 490. Even if the immediate cause of the loss is the dishonesty or failure of a third party, the trustee is liable to make good that loss to the trust estate if, but for the breach, such loss would not have occurred: see Underhill and Hayton, Law of Trusts and Trustees 14th ed. (1987) pp. 734-736; In re Dawson decd.; Union Fidelity Trustee Co Ltd v Perpetual Trustee Co Ltd [1966] 2 NSWR 211; Bartlett v Barclays Bank Trust Co Ltd (Nos. 1 and 2) [1980] Ch. 515. Thus the common law rules of remoteness of damage and causation do not apply. However there does have to be some causal connection between the breach of trust and the loss to the trust estate for which compensation is recoverable viz. the fact that the loss would not have occurred but for the breach: see also In re Miller's Deed Trusts (1978) 75 L.S.G. 454; Nestle v National Westminster Bank Plc [1993] 1 WLR 1260.

== See also ==
- English trusts law
- South Australia Asset Management Corpn v York Montague Ltd [1996] UKHL 10
