= Nick Browne-Wilkinson, Baron Browne-Wilkinson =

British judge (1930–2018)

The Right Honourable The Lord Browne-Wilkinson PC

Senior Lord of Appeal in Ordinary
- In office 1998 – 5 June 2000
- Monarch: Elizabeth II
- Preceded by: The Lord Goff of Chieveley
- Succeeded by: The Lord Bingham of Cornhill

Lord of Appeal in Ordinary
- In office 1 October 1991 – 5 June 2000
- Preceded by: The Lord Brandon of Oakbrook
- Succeeded by: The Lord Bingham of Cornhill

Vice-Chancellor
- In office 1985 – 1 October 1991
- Preceded by: Sir Robert Megarry
- Succeeded by: Sir Donald Nicholls

Member of the House of Lords
- Lord Temporal
- Lord of Appeal in Ordinary; 1 October 1991 – 1 March 2016

Personal details
- Born: Nicolas Christopher Henry Browne-Wilkinson; 30 March 1930
- Died: 25 July 2018 (aged 88)

Nicolas Christopher Henry Browne-Wilkinson, Baron Browne-Wilkinson PC (30 March 1930 – 25 July 2018) was a British judge who served as a Lord of Appeal in Ordinary from 1991 to 2000, and Senior Lord of Appeal in Ordinary from 1998 to 2000.

== Life and career ==
Browne-Wilkinson was the sixth child and only son of the Rev Canon Arthur Browne-Wilkinson, MC, and of Mary Abraham, daughter of Charles Abraham, Bishop of Derby. He was educated at Lancing and at Magdalen College, Oxford, where he took a First in Jurisprudence in 1952. He was called to the Bar at Lincoln's Inn in 1953 and took silk in 1972. He was a judge of the Court of Appeal of Jersey and of Guernsey from 1976 to 1977.

In 1977, Browne-Wilkinson was appointed a Justice of the High Court of Justice and assigned to the Chancery Division, receiving the customary knighthood. He was promoted as a Lord Justice of Appeal in 1983, and was of sworn of the Privy Council. From 1985 to 1991 he was Vice-Chancellor, the de facto head of the Chancery Division.

He was made a Lord of Appeal in Ordinary and was created a life peer as Baron Browne-Wilkinson, of Camden in the London Borough of Camden on 1 October 1991, and was Senior Lord of Appeal in Ordinary from 1998 until his retirement as Law Lord in 2000. His tenure as Senior Law Lord was marred by the controversy surrounding the Pinochet extradition case. He retired from the House of Lords under the House of Lords Reform Act 2014 on 1 March 2016.

== Family ==
Browne-Wilkinson married Ursula de Lacy Bacon in 1955; they had three sons and two daughters. After her death in 1987, he married Hilary Warburton in 1996.

== Selected judgments ==
- Johnstone v Bloomsbury Health Authority [1992] QB 333
- Airedale NHS Trust v Bland [1993] AC 789
- Tan Te Lam v Superintendent of Tai A Chau Detention Centre [1997] AC 97
- Westdeutsche Landesbank Girozentrale v Islington London Borough Council [1996] AC 669
- R v Bow Street Metropolitan Stipendiary Magistrate, Ex p Pinochet Ugarte (No 2) [2000] 1 AC 119
- R v Bow Street Metropolitan Stipendiary Magistrate, Ex p Pinochet Ugarte (No 3) [2000] 1 AC 147
- Multiservice Bookbinding Ltd v Marden [1979] Ch 84
- Target Holdings Ltd v Redferns [1996] AC 421

Legal offices
Preceded by Robert Megarry	Vice-Chancellor; 1985–1991	Succeeded by Donald Nicholls
Preceded by Robert, Lord Goff of Chieveley	Senior Law Lord; 1998–2000	Succeeded by Tom, Lord Bingham of Cornhill
