= Re Hallett's Estate =

1880 English trusts law case

- Court: Court of Appeal
- Citation: (1880) 13 Ch D 696

Court membership
- Judges sitting: Sir George Jessel MR; Baggallay LJ; Thesiger LJ

Keywords
- Tracing

Re Hallett’s Estate (1880) 13 Ch D 696 is an English trusts law case, concerning asset tracing.

== Facts ==
Mr Hallett, a solicitor, held bonds for Mrs Cotterill worth £2,145 until he wrongfully sold them and put the proceeds in his current bank account, with Winning’s Bank, mixed with his own money. When he died the account had £3,000.

== Judgment ==
=== High Court ===
Fry J was concerned with whether Mr Hallett had a fiduciary relation, given he held as a bailee, and not a trust, strictly speaking. He held the first in first out rule applied, following Pennell v Deffell (1853) 4 De GM&G 372, so that a large proportion of Mrs Cotterrill’s money was in fact already paid out.

=== Court of Appeal ===
Sir George Jessel MR held that there was a fiduciary relationship, and the proceeds of the sale of the bonds could be traced. It then went back to determine how much could be traced. A trustee cannot say trust money is merely lost. He reversed Fry J and held that the claimants were entitled to an equitable charge of £2,145 over the fund. There was a presumption that a fiduciary is acting honestly and therefore intends not to dissipate the beneficiary’s money rather than his own.

Now, first upon principle, nothing can be better settled, either in our own law, or, I suppose, the law of all civilised countries, than this, that where a man does an act which may be rightfully performed, he cannot say that the act was intentionally and in fact done wrongly ... ... he cannot be heard to say that he took away the trust money when he had a right to take away his own money. The simplest case put is the mingling of trust moneys in a bag with money of the trustee’s own. Suppose he has a hundred sovereigns in a bag, and he adds to them another hundred sovereigns of his own… and the next day he draws out for his own purposes £100, is it tolerable for anybody to allege that what he drew out was the first £100, the trust money, and that he misappropriated it, and left his own £100 in the bag?

Baggallay LJ concurred.

Thesiger LJ dissented, arguing they were bound by Pennell v Deffell.

The Court also held that in the case of a mixture of trust funds with the trustee's own money, only an equitable lien would be available as a remedy. This has since been overruled by Foskett v McKeown [2001] 1 AC 102, where the House of Lords held that the beneficiary has the option of choosing an equitable lien or a constructive trust in the case of a mixed fund. A constructive trust would allow a claim in the new asset in proportion to the contribution of the beneficiary's trust fund.

== See also ==
- English trusts law
- Foskett v McKeown
