= Adam London =

English cricketer

Personal information
- Full name: Adam Brian London
- Born: 12 October 1988 (age 38); Ashford, Surrey, England
- Batting: Left-handed
- Bowling: Right arm off break

Domestic team information
- Years: Team
- 2009–2013: Middlesex (squad no. 19)
- 2013: → Hampshire (on loan)

Career statistics
Competition	First-class	List A
Matches	12	4
Runs scored	497	9
Batting average	27.61	4.50
100s/50s	–/4	–/–
Top score	81	6
Balls bowled	102	6
Wickets	1	0
Bowling average	59.00	–
5 wickets in innings	–	–
10 wickets in match	–	–
Best bowling	1/15	–
Catches/stumpings	9/–	3/–
- Source: Cricinfo, 6 October 2020

Adam Brian London (born 12 October 1988) is an English former cricketer who played first-class and List A cricket predominantly for Middlesex.

London was born in October 1988 in Ashford, Surrey. He was educated at The Bishop Wand Church of England School. London made his debut in first-class cricket for Middlesex against Gloucestershire at Lord's in the 2009 County Championship, with him making three further appearances that season in the County Championship; in these, he scored 190 runs at an average of 27.14 and made two half centuries. In the same season, he made two List A one-day appearances in the NatWest Pro40 against Lancashire and Derbyshire. Following the end of the 2009 season, he signed a two-year contract extension. The following season, he made four first-class appearances early in the season, scoring 137 runs at an average of 22.83, with one half century. He did not play for the Middlesex first eleven in 2011, but did return in 2012 to make one first-class appearance against Durham MCCU and play against the touring West Indians in a one-day match. At the end of the season, he was given a one-year contract extension by Middlesex. He began the 2013 season by making a first-class appearance against Cambridge MCCU, and later in the season he made two appearances in the County Championship against Sussex and Yorkshire. In August, he trialled for Hampshire alongside Middlesex teammate Josh Davey in a one-day match against a touring Bangladesh A team at the Rose Bowl. He was released by Middlesex following the 2013 season.

After his short professional career, London became Director of Cricket at Richmond Cricket Club in May 2017, but stepped away from the game to focus on his mental health in 2021.
