= Edward Were =

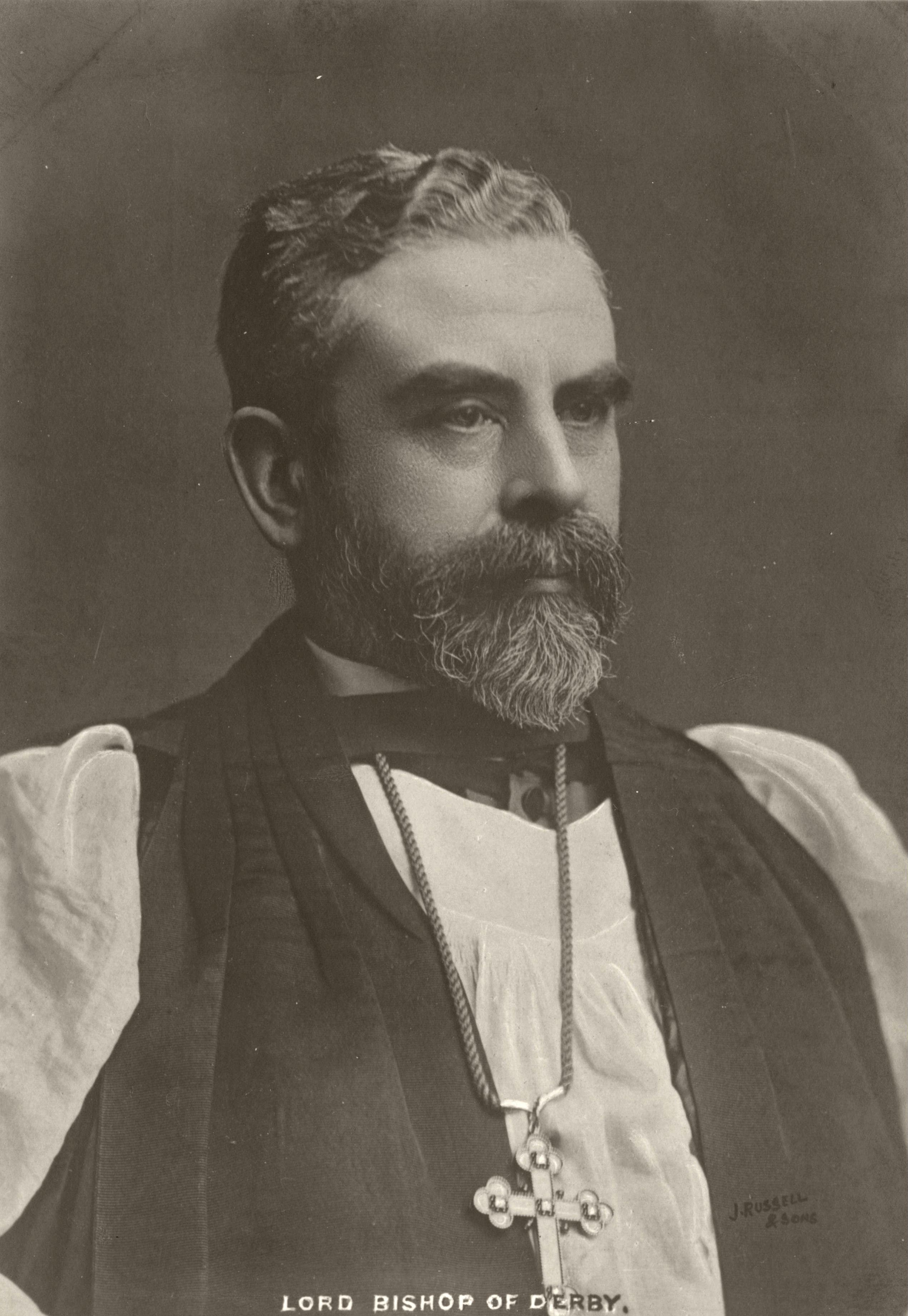
Edward Were

Edward Ash Were (14 November 1846–8 April 1915) was an Anglican suffragan bishop in the latter part of the 19th century and the first decades of the 20th.

He was educated at Rugby School and New College, Oxford. After graduation, he was an Assistant Master at Winchester College for ten years before becoming Vicar of North Bradley in Wiltshire. After a spell as Chaplain to George Ridding, Bishop of Southwell he became the first, and long serving, Bishop of Derby (then a suffragan bishop in the Diocese of Southwell). In 1909 in a sideways move he was translated to the Diocese of Lichfield to be their suffragan Bishop of Stafford. His son, who perished in the First World War, was also a distinguished clergyman.

Church of England titles
New title	Bishop suffragan of Derby; 1889–1909	Succeeded by Charles Abraham
New title	Bishop of Stafford; 1909–1915	Succeeded by Lionel Crawfurd
