= Matthew Parker (bishop) =

British bishop (born 1963)

Matthew John Parker (born 1 June 1963, in Manchester) is a British bishop who has served as area Bishop of Stafford since 2021. He was previously Archdeacon of Stoke (i.e. the same area) since 2013.

== Education ==
Parker was educated at The Bishop Wand Church of England School, the University of Manchester, Sidney Sussex College, Cambridge and Ridley Hall, Cambridge.

== Ordained ministry ==
Parker was ordained in the Church of England as a deacon in 1988 and as a priest in 1989. He served as an assistant curate at St Mary's Church, Twickenham from 1988 to 1991, and at St George's Church, Heaviley from 1991 to 1994. He was then team vicar of the Stockport SW Team from 1993 to 2000, and team rector of the Leek and Meerbrook Team from 2000 to 2013.

On 24 September 2020, it was announced that he would be the next Bishop of Stafford in the Diocese of Lichfield. He was scheduled to be consecrated as bishop on 28 January 2021, and installed at Lichfield Cathedral on 7 February 2021, but these were postponed and Parker licensed as Episcopal vicar for the Stafford episcopal area. He was consecrated a bishop on 14 April 2021 during a Covid limited service at Lambeth Palace, in the third of the three consecration services there that day. The principal consecrator was Anthony Poggo, the Archbishop of Canterbury's Advisor on Anglican Communion Affairs, assisted by Sarah Mullally and Jonathan Clark.

=== Views ===
In November 2023, he was one of 44 Church of England bishops who signed an open letter supporting the use of the Prayers of Love and Faith (i.e. blessings for same-sex couples) and called for "Guidance being issued without delay that includes the removal of all restrictions on clergy entering same-sex civil marriages, and on bishops ordaining and licensing such clergy".

Church of England titles
Preceded by Godfrey Stone	Archdeacon of Stoke; 2013–2021	Succeeded by Megan Smith
Preceded by Geoff Annas	Bishop of Stafford; 2021-present	Incumbent
