= Godfrey Stone =

British churchman

The Ven. Godfrey Owen Stone, FRGS (born 15 December 1949) is a British clergyman who was Archdeacon of Stoke from 2002 until 2013.

He was ordained deacon in 1981, and priest in 1982. After a curacy at Rushden-with-Newton Bromswold he was Director of Pastoral Studies at Wycliffe Hall, Oxford from 1987 to 1992. He was Team Rector at Bucknall from 1992 to 2002; and Rural Dean of Stoke-upon-Trent from 1998 to 2002.

He was chair of the ecumenical Christian charity 'The Friends of the Church in China' from 2017 to 2023 (www.thefcc.org).

Church of England titles
Preceded by Alan Smith	Archdeacon of Stoke; 2002–2013	Succeeded by Matthew Parker
