= Dennis Ede =

Archdeacon of Stoke (1931–2021)

The Ven. Dennis Ede (8 June 1931 – 23 January 2021) was a British clergyman who served as Archdeacon of Stoke from 1990–97.

He was educated at Ardingly College, the University of Nottingham (BA Theology 1955) and Ripon Hall, Oxford. He was ordained deacon in 1957 and priest in 1958. He served his title at St Giles' Church, Sheldon (1957–60) and St Mary and St Margaret's Church, Castle Bromwich (including being in charge of St Philip and St James's, Hodge Hill) (1960–64). He was then Minister of St Philip and St James's Ecclesiastical District, Hodge Hill (1964–70), Team Rector in the Hodge Hill Team Ministry (1970–76), Chaplain of Sandwell District General Hospital (1976–90), and Vicar of All Saints' and St Mary Magdalene's, West Bromwich (1976–90). During that incumbency he was also Curate-in-Charge of Christ Church, West Bromwich (1976–79), Rural Dean of West Bromwich (1976–90), and Prebendary of Lichfield Cathedral (1983–90).

He died in 2021, aged 89.

Church of England titles
| Preceded by John Delight | Archdeacon of Stoke; 1990–1997 | Succeeded by Alan Smith |
