= Lionel Crawfurd =

Lionel Payne Crawfurd (1864–1934) was the second Suffragan Bishop of Stafford.

Educated at Eton and Balliol College, Oxford, he was ordained in 1890 and began his career with a curacy at St Cuthbert’s Gateshead. He was then successively Vice Principal of Leeds Clergy School, Bishop's Chaplain in Adelaide, and Secretary of the Home Missionary Society. In June 1902 he was asked to return to Gateshead as Vicar, and was then incumbent at Ramsgate and Ashford, Kent, before ascending to the Episcopate in 1915, a post he held for 19 years. A deeper thinker his Times obituary described him as “a kind, approachable man with a deep love of the countryside".

== Notes ==
Church of England titles
Preceded by Edward Ash Were	Bishop of Stafford; 1915 – 1934	Succeeded by Douglas Crick
