= Michael Scott-Joynt =

English bishop

The Right Reverend Michael Scott-Joynt
- Bishop of Winchester
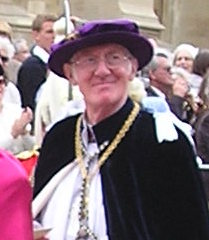
- Scott-Joynt as Prelate of the Order of the Garter, 2006
- Church: Church of England
- Appointed: 1995
- Term ended: 2011
- Predecessor: Colin James
- Successor: Tim Dakin
- Other posts: Bishop of Stafford; 1987–1995 (area bishop: 1992–1995)

Orders
- Ordination: 1967
- Consecration: 1987

Personal details
- Born: 15 March 1943 Bromley, Kent
- Died: 27 September 2014 (aged 71)
- Denomination: Anglican
- Spouse: Louise White (1965—2014, his death)
- Children: 2 sons & 1 daughter
- Education: King's College, Cambridge

Member of the House of Lords
- Lord Spiritual
- Ex officio as Bishop of Winchester; 12 February 1996 – 31 May 2011

Michael Charles Scott-Joynt (15 March 1943 – 27 September 2014) was an English bishop and a Prelate of the Order of the Garter. He was appointed Bishop of Winchester, one of the five senior bishoprics in the Church of England, in 1995. He had previously served as Bishop of Stafford in the Diocese of Lichfield from 1987 and before that as a canon residentiary at St Albans Cathedral. On 10 October 2010, it was announced that Scott-Joynt intended to retire, which he did in May 2011.

== Education and career ==
Scott-Joynt was educated at Bradfield College and King's College, Cambridge (BA 1965, MA 1968) and Cuddesdon Theological College. He was ordained as a deacon in 1967 and priest in 1968. He was a curate at Church of All Saints, Cuddesdon (1967–70) and a tutor at Cuddesdon College (1967–71); he then served as Chaplain of Cuddesdon (1971–72). He was Team Vicar of Newbury (1972–75); priest-in-charge at Caversfield (1975–79); Bicester (1975–79); and Bucknell, Oxfordshire (1976–79). He was rector of the Bicester Area Team Ministry (1979–81); Rural Dean of Bicester and Islip (1976–81); a residential canon of St Albans Cathedral (1982–87); and Director of Ordinands and In-Service Training in the Diocese of St Albans (1982–87). He was the suffragan Bishop of Stafford (1987–1995, area bishop 1992–1995) before being appointed as Bishop of Winchester in 1995, retiring in 2011. He was consecrated a bishop on 22 July 1987, by Robert Runcie, Archbishop of Canterbury, at Southwark Cathedral.

He married Louise White in 1965 and they had two sons and one daughter. On 27 September 2014, he died at the age of 71. She died in 2022.

== Opinions ==
He attracted note for some of his more outspoken opinions. His Christmas Day sermon of 2001 was titled "This Terror Is a Judgment upon Us". In it, he called the 11 September 2001 attacks "cruelly evil as they were" a judgment upon the developed nations' promotion of their own standard of living at the expense of the global poor, and condemned the Middle East policies of the Western nations. He was also one of 52 UK bishops who signed a letter in 2003 calling for reform of arms export laws.

He chaired a Church of England committee in 2000, which urged a lifting of the ban on remarriage of divorcees whose former spouse was still living. The report insisted that the Church of England was not abandoning its position that marriage is for life, but rather acknowledging the situation of many within society whose former marriages had long ceased to have any real existence. However, he insisted at the time that this would not necessarily open the way for Prince Charles to marry Camilla Parker Bowles. In the event, the wedding of Prince Charles and Parker Bowles took the form of a civil marriage which was immediately followed by a service of blessing in St George's Chapel, Windsor.

In 2003, he was (unexpectedly at the time) signatory to an open letter from 17 Church of England bishops opposing the nomination of Jeffrey John, an openly gay priest in a long-term relationship, as suffragan bishop-designate of Reading. The other nine diocesan bishop signatories were: Michael Langrish (Exeter), Michael Nazir-Ali (Rochester), Peter Forster (Chester), James Jones (Liverpool), George Cassidy (Southwell & Nottingham), Graham Dow (Carlisle), John Hind (Chichester) and David James (Bradford).

Scott-Joynt was one of the Church of England's most prominent supporters of traditional sexual morality, for example voting against the Equality Act (Sexual Orientation) Regulations in the House of Lords because there was no provision for religious conscience. He also argued that the introduction of civil partnership legislation in the UK threatened the uniqueness of marriage and declared he would closely question clergy in his diocese who entered a civil partnership. In 2008, he said, in relation to the exclusion of Christians in same-sex relationships from positions of leadership (such as bishoprics like his own): "I see no future for the Anglican Communion as we know it, or for the Church of England as we know it, if either deserts this teaching."

== Styles ==
- Michael Scott-Joynt Esq (1943–1967)
- The Revd Michael Scott-Joynt (1967–1982)
- The Revd Canon Michael Scott-Joynt (1982–1987)
- The Rt Revd Michael Scott-Joynt (1987—2014)

Church of England titles
Preceded by John Waller	Bishop of Stafford; 1987–1995	Succeeded by Christopher Hill
Preceded by Colin James	Bishop of Winchester; 1995–2011	Succeeded by Tim Dakin
