= Tracing in English law =

Procedure to identify property taken from a claimant

Tracing is a procedure in English law used to identify property (such as money) which has been taken from the claimant involuntarily or which the claimant wishes to recover. It is not in itself a way to recover the property, but rather to identify it so that the courts can decide what remedy to apply. The procedure is used in several situations, broadly demarcated by whether the property has been transferred because of theft, breach of trust, or mistake.

Tracing is divided into two forms, common law tracing and equitable tracing. Common law tracing relies on the claimant having legal ownership of the property, and will fail if the property has been mixed with other property, the legal title has been transferred to the defendant, or the legal title has been transferred by the defendant to any further recipient of the property. Equitable tracing, on the other hand, relies on the claimant having an equitable interest in the property, and can succeed where the property has been mixed with other property.

Defences to tracing are possible, particularly if returning the property would harm an innocent defendant, where the claimant has made false representations that the defendant relied on to his detriment, or where the property has been transferred to an innocent third party without anything given to the defendant in return that the claimant could recover in lieu.

== Definition ==
Tracing is a process that allows for the recovery of original property (such as land or money) by the owner if it is taken involuntarily, and the owner has not consented to the transfer of title. This can be through theft, breach of trust, or mistake. Tracing also shows any proceeds of sale or property purchased using trust property in the hands of the trustee or third parties. Owners can recover their property and perhaps also any profits made from it, or in situations where the property cannot be recovered (as it has been mixed in with other property, or cannot be found), substitute property. If goods sold commercially have not been paid for and the contract of sale included a retention of title clause, tracing by the seller may be required. The process has two steps, following and tracing. In Foskett v McKeown, Lord Millett defined them by saying that "[Following and tracing] are both exercises in locating assets which may or may be taken to represent an asset belonging to the [claimants] and to which they assert ownership. The process of following and tracing are, however, distinct. Following is the process of following the same asset as it moves from hand to hand. Tracing is the process of identifying a new asset as the substitute for the old". Following, therefore, is simply establishing who the original owner of property is, where that property is, and returning it to the original owner. Tracing arises when the property cannot be returned and the court is asked to recognise an interest in new property, such as whatever the defendant received in exchange for the claimant's original property. Tracing can occur at both the common law and equity. It is not a remedy for breach of trust; tracing is merely the process of identifying the property. It is then up to the courts to decide what will happen to it.

== Tracing in common law ==
Common law tracing is where the claimant seeks to identify property that belongs to him at common law. This is where physical possession of the property passes, but not legal ownership. The problem with common law tracing is that the property must be identifiable; if it has been mixed with other property, such as money paid into an account with other money from a different source, it cannot be successfully recovered. In FC Jones & Sons v Jones there as no mixing of property (In a bank account or otherwise) with any other property, so the property was reclaimed. It is also essential that the involuntary transfer did not also transfer the legal title, nor any succeeding transfer. If this has happened, the property is also not recoverable under the common law. Someone with an equitable interest in the property but no legal title, as in MCC Proceeds v Lehman Brothers, cannot recover the money under common law. Due to these limitations, "many leading academics and judges" have suggested that common law tracing should be completely merged with equitable tracing.

== Tracing in equity ==
Equitable tracing is based not on legal ownership but on the claimant's possession of an equitable interest. There are several advantages to equitable tracing; first, it can trace property now mixed with other property. In Boscawen v Bajwa, Millett justified this by saying that "equity's power to charge a mixed fund with the repayment of trust moneys enables the claimant to follow the money, not because it is his, but because it is derived from a fund which is treated as if it were subject to a charge in his favour". A limitation is that where the property has been put into a bank account that no longer contains enough money to repay it, it cannot be traced.

For equitable tracing to be valid, several things must be demonstrated. First, the equitable title must exist; it can be brought into existence by the courts, such as in constructive trusts. Secondly, there must be some kind of fiduciary relationship between the claimant and the defendant. If the property was transferred through breach of trust, it will not be necessary to establish such a relationship, because it already exists. In addition, property transferred through breach of trust may be traced to any third party (other than a purchaser in good faith), even if they did not previously have a fiduciary relationship with the claimant. Historically, the courts have been willing to be "generous in finding that the necessary fiduciary relationship existed", even going so far as to recognise relationships that did not exist at the time of the transfer.

=== Mixture of trust funds with trustee's funds ===
Equitable tracing's greatest strength is its ability to trace into mixtures of money. Different rules apply in different situations; where the money has been mixed with the money of a trustee, where a trust fund has been mixed with another trust fund (or money belonging to an innocent volunteer), and where money has been transferred by mistake rather than malicious intent. Where the money has been mixed with the money of a trustee, the court's decision depends on the motive of the trustee. Because a trustee is expected to invest trust property and behave honestly, the courts may choose to find that the trustee transferred the money to further the goal of the trust. Since the trustee is assumed to behave honestly, any profits made may be assumed (by this "convenient fiction") to be made by the trust money, and any losses from the trustee's personal funds.

The alternate approach taken is the "beneficiary election" approach. This is that where trust funds are wrongly mixed with the trustee's personal funds, used for an investment, and the money is thus not recoverable, the beneficiaries are allowed to "elect" whether the investment is to be held as a security for the amounts owed to them, or whether to take the unauthorised investment as part of the trust fund. This is considered the exception, rather than the rule; in Foskett v McKeown, Millett said that "The primary rule in regard to a mixed fund, therefore, is that gains and losses are borne by the contributors rateably. The beneficiary's right to elect instead to enforce a lien to obtain repayment is an exception to the primary rule, exercisable where the fund is deficient and the claim is made against the wrongdoer and those claiming through him".

=== Innocent parties and mistake ===
Where funds are mixed with those of another trust, or mixed with the funds of an "innocent volunteer", certain general principles apply. As laid out in Re Diplock, the principle applied is that the claimant's entitlement ranks pari passu to that of the volunteer; each has an equal claim to their funds. Whether the fund decreases or increases in value, each party can claim a percentage equal to their contribution. The problem here comes if the mixed funds are used in unequal chunks to acquire other property. The long-standing rule is that established in Clayton's Case; that the money deposited first is deemed to be spent on the first property purchased. The problem with this is that if the first property becomes less valuable than the second property purchased, the first claimant loses some of their money while the second claimant is able to claim their money in its entirety. The alternate approach is the previously mentioned pari passu idea; whatever the total property is worth, the claimants get a share proportionate to their input, without assuming that the first claimant's money is tied to the first property purchased and the second claimant's money to the second property. In Barlow Clowes International v Vaughan, the Court of Appeal applied a similar set of principles, holding that the size of the contribution and the amount of time the money was part of the mixed fund were the factors to be considered.

Where payments have been made by mistake claimants may or may not be able to recoup their losses. The leading case is Westdeutsche Landesbank Girozentrale v Islington LBC, where Lord Browne-Wilkinson declared that a constructive trust would be created when the recipient of the funds became aware of the mistaken transfer. As such, ignorance of the mistake would not create a fiduciary relationship, therefore not a trust, and the property would be untraceable.

== Loss of the right to trace and defences ==
The right to trace may be lost if the property cannot be found, or no longer exists. Defences to tracing are possible. The "change of position" defence is where the defendant has received property and giving it back would change his personal circumstances. This was concisely defined by Lord Goff in Lipkin Gorman v Karpnale as "Where an innocent defendant's position is so changed that he will suffer an injustice if called upon to repay or to repay in full, the injustice of requiring him so to repay outweighs the injustice of denying the plaintiff restitution". Such a defence is closely linked with unjust enrichment, and has limitations. Any bad faith on the part of the defendant will invalidate the defence, such as if the recipient of the property has encouraged the payer to transfer it or has received it by mistake and then used it without making enquiries. The defence is also not available to people who act illegally, as in Barros Mattos v MacDaniels Ltd. Activity which constitutes a "change of position" can be broadly defined as taking steps which would not otherwise have been taken, or not taking steps which otherwise would have been taken, as a result of receiving the property.

Another defence is that of "estoppel by representation". This is similar to "change of position", and comes about when the defendant can show that the claimant made some false representation to him, which he acted upon to his detriment. Traditionally, the entire property would be the defendant's if the defence was successful. In National Westminster Bank plc v Somer International, however, the Court of Appeal decided that the defendant was only allowed to retain property equal to his losses due to the claimant's representation. Another defence similar to "change of position" is that of passing on, where the defendant has passed the property on to a third person without any benefit for the defendant; it is thus impossible to trace the property as the defendant has neither the property nor any proceeds from transferring it.

== Barriers to tracing ==
Tracing can be barred in three types of situations. One is where property is in the hands of a bona fide purchaser for value without notice. This is when someone buys trust property with good faith not knowing that it is trust property, and provides value for it, then it cannot be traced into their hands. Another is where the property has been dissipated or destroyed, for example when money has all been spent on living expenses. Lastly, if the money has been used to improve the land; in that case, it is inequitable to trace, and the beneficiaries cannot assert any property claim. In Re Diplock, a large amount of money was thought to be held on charitable trust. That charitable trust was invalid, but by the time that was established, a lot of money had been given to charities. The Court of Appeal looked at how much of that money could be traced into the hands of the charities that received it as innocent volunteers. It was held that any charity that had used the money that it received to improve their land, the tracing claim failed

Backwards tracing

Backwards tracing applies where the asset was acquired before the breach of trust, and trust money is used to pay off a loan used to buy the asset. It is only allowed if there is 'co-ordination' between the acquisition of the asset and the breach of trust. The trustee must have borrowed the money with the intention, at the time, of using trust money to discharge it. In Federal Republic of Brazil v Durant International Corporation it was held that backwards tracing is not allowed where the trustee uses the money to pay off a loan, and thereby acquires unencumbered title to whatever was bought with the loan. You cannot backwards trace an asset which was acquired before the breach of trust unless there is co-ordination between the acquisition of asset and the breach of trust.

== Bibliography ==
- Edwards, Richard; Nigel Stockwell (2007). Trusts and Equity (8th ed.). Pearson Longman. ISBN 978-1-4058-4684-4.
- Hudson, Alastair (2009). Equity and Trusts (6th ed.). Routledge-Cavendish. ISBN 0-415-49771-X.
