= John Delight =

The Venerable John David Delight (24 August 1925 - 16 February 2013) was a British clergyman who served as Archdeacon of Stoke from 1982 to 1990.

== Early life and education ==
Delight was educated at Christ's Hospital, the University of Liverpool, Oak Hill Theological College, the Open University (BA Theology 1955) and Ripon Hall, Oxford.

== Career ==
After wartime service in the RNVR he served curacies at Tooting Graveney and Wallington. He was then:

- Travelling Secretary of the Inter-Varsity Fellowship of Students from 1958 to 1961
- Curate-in-Charge (Vicar from 1968) at St Christopher, Leicester from 1961 to 1969
- Chaplain of HM Prison Leicester from 1962 to 1967
- Rector of Aldridge from 1969 to 1982
- Rural Dean of Walsall from 1981 to 1982
- Prebendary of Lichfield Cathedral from 1980 to 1990
- Archdeacon of Stoke-on-Trent from 1982 to 1990
- Diocesan Director of Theological Education and Honorary Canon of All Souls' Cathedral, Machakos, Kenya from 1990 to 1994.

== Death ==
Delight died in February 2013 at the age of 87.

Church of England titles
| Preceded by Charles Borrett | Archdeacon of Stoke; 1982–1989 | Succeeded by Dennis Ede |
