= Herbert Crump =

Archdeacon of Stoke from 1905 to 1908

The Ven. John Herbert Crump (28 September 1849 – 12 June 1924) was an English Anglican clergyman who was Archdeacon of Stoke from 1905–08.

Crump was born in Rowley Regis, Staffordshire, and educated at St Edmund's School, Canterbury and Jesus College, Cambridge. He was ordained in 1879 and began his career with a curacy in Smethwick. He was then Vicar of Holy Trinity in that town from 1884 to 1892; then Rector of Stoke-on-Trent from 1892 to 1897; Vicar of Longdon from 1898 to 1905; and Prebendary of Lichfield from 1901 to 1912.

He died in 1924, aged 74.

Church of England titles
| Preceded by Ernald Lane | Archdeacon of Stoke; 1905–1908 | Succeeded by John Malcolm Alexander Graham |
