= Charles Borrett =

English Anglican archdeacon

The Ven. Charles Walter Borrett (15 September 1916 – 30 November 2000) was Archdeacon of Stoke-on-Trent from 1956 to 1970.

Borrett was educated at Framlingham College, Emmanuel College, Cambridge and Ridley Hall, Cambridge; and ordained deacon in 1941, and priest in 1943. After curacies at Newmarket and Wolverhampton he was Vicar of Tettenhall Regis from 1949 to 1971. He was Rural Dean of Trysull from 1958 to 1971; Prebendary of Flixton in Lichfield Cathedral from 1964 to 1971; Priest in charge of Sandon from 1975 to 1982; and an Honorary Chaplain to the Queen from 1980 to 1986.

Church of England titles
Preceded by George Youell	Archdeacon of Stoke-on-Trent; 1971–1982	Succeeded by John David Delight
