= John Waller (bishop) =

- Bishop of Stafford
- Diocese: Diocese of Lichfield
- In office: 1979–1987
- Predecessor: John Waine
- Successor: Michael Scott-Joynt
- Other post: Honorary assistant bishop in Bath & Wells (1987–2003)

Orders
- Ordination: 1950 (deacon); 1951 (priest)
- Consecration: 25 January 1979

Personal details
- Born: 18 April 1924
- Died: 3 September 2015 (aged 91)
- Denomination: Anglican
- Spouse: Pamela Peregrine (m. 1951)
- Children: 5
- Profession: Seaman
- Education: Peterhouse, Cambridge

John Stevens Waller (18 April 1924 – 3 September 2015) was an Anglican bishop who served as the seventh Bishop of Stafford, a suffragan bishop of the Diocese of Lichfield.

Waller was educated at St Edward's School, Oxford and served during World War II with the Royal Naval Volunteer Reserve (RNVR). When peace came, he studied at Peterhouse, Cambridge and Wells Theological College before being ordained: made deacon on Trinity Sunday 1950 (4 June) and ordained priest the following Trinity Sunday (20 May 1951) — both times by William Wand, Bishop of London, at St Paul's Cathedral. He began his career with curacies at Hillingdon and Tiverton before incumbencies at Strood and Harpenden. In 1979, he was appointed to the episcopate as Bishop suffragan of Stafford, a post he held for eight years. He was consecrated a bishop on 25 January 1979, by Donald Coggan, Archbishop of Canterbury, at Westminster Abbey. A man of strong convictions he retired in 1987, becoming an honorary assistant bishop within the Diocese of Bath and Wells.

Church of England titles
| Preceded by John Waine | Bishop of Stafford; 1979–1987 | Succeeded by Michael Scott-Joynt |
