= Lemprière Hammond =

Lemprière Durell Hammond (1881–1965) was the fourth Suffragan Bishop of Stafford.

Educated at St Augustine’s School Dewsbury and Lincoln Theological College, he was ordained in 1909 and began his career with a curacy at Chatham. He was then successively Vicar of St Mary the Virgin at Strood in Kent, Vicar of Holy Trinity Church, Dartford, Rural Dean of Walsall and a Canon Residentiary at Lichfield Cathedral before being consecrated to the Episcopate in 1939, a post he held for 19 years. A great cricketer, his Times obituary described him as “a man most at home amongst the artisans of urban parishes”.

== Notes ==
Church of England titles
| Preceded by Douglas Crick | Bishop of Stafford; 1939 – 1958 | Succeeded by Richard George Clitherow |
