= Richard Clitherow (bishop) =

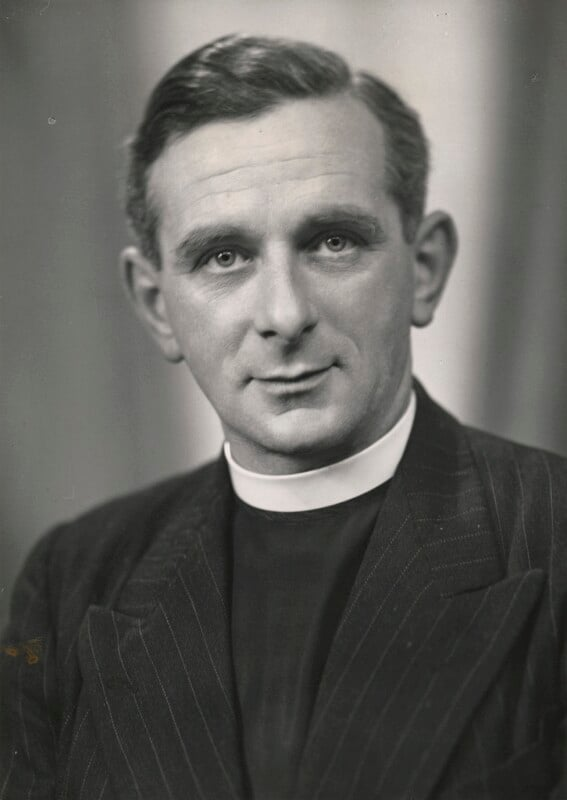
Clitherow in 1951

Richard George Clitherow (1909–1984) was the fifth Suffragan Bishop of Stafford. Educated at Dulwich College and Corpus Christi College, Cambridge, he was ordained in 1936 and began his career with a curacy at Bermondsey. When World War II came he became a Naval Chaplain. From 1946 to 1958 he was Canon Residentiary at Guildford Cathedral before ascending to the Episcopate, a post he held until retirement 18 years later.

== Notes ==
Church of England titles
Preceded by Lemprière Durell Hammond	Bishop of Stafford; 1958 – 1974	Succeeded by John Waine
