= Bishop of Derby (suffragan) =

Anglican suffragan bishop in England

The Bishop of Derby was a suffragan bishop of the Church of England Diocese of Southwell in the Province of Canterbury.

The title was first created as a suffragan see within the Diocese of Southwell. The suffragan Bishop of Derby assisted the diocesan Bishop of Southwell in overseeing the diocese.

== List of bishops ==
Bishops of Derby
From	Until	Incumbent	Notes
1889	1909	Edward Were	Translated to Stafford.
1909	1927	Charles Abraham	
In 1927, the suffragan see ended with the creation of the diocesan see.
