= The Bishop Wand Church of England School =

Location
- Laytons Lane; Sunbury-on-Thames, Surrey, TW16 6LT; England; 51.4102°N 0.4260°W

Information
- Type: Academy
- Motto: Realising God-given potential
- Religious affiliation: Church of England
- Established: c. 1969
- Local authority: Surrey County Council
- Department for Education URN: 138491 Tables
- Ofsted: Reports
- Headteacher: Daniel Aldridge
- Gender: Mixed
- Age: 11 to 18
- Enrolment: approx. 1,300 students
- Houses: Brisbane, Chichester, Kensington, Lancaster, Salisbury, Winchester and York
- Colours: Crimson & gold House colours:
- Publication: The Read
- Website: www.bishopwand.surrey.sch.uk

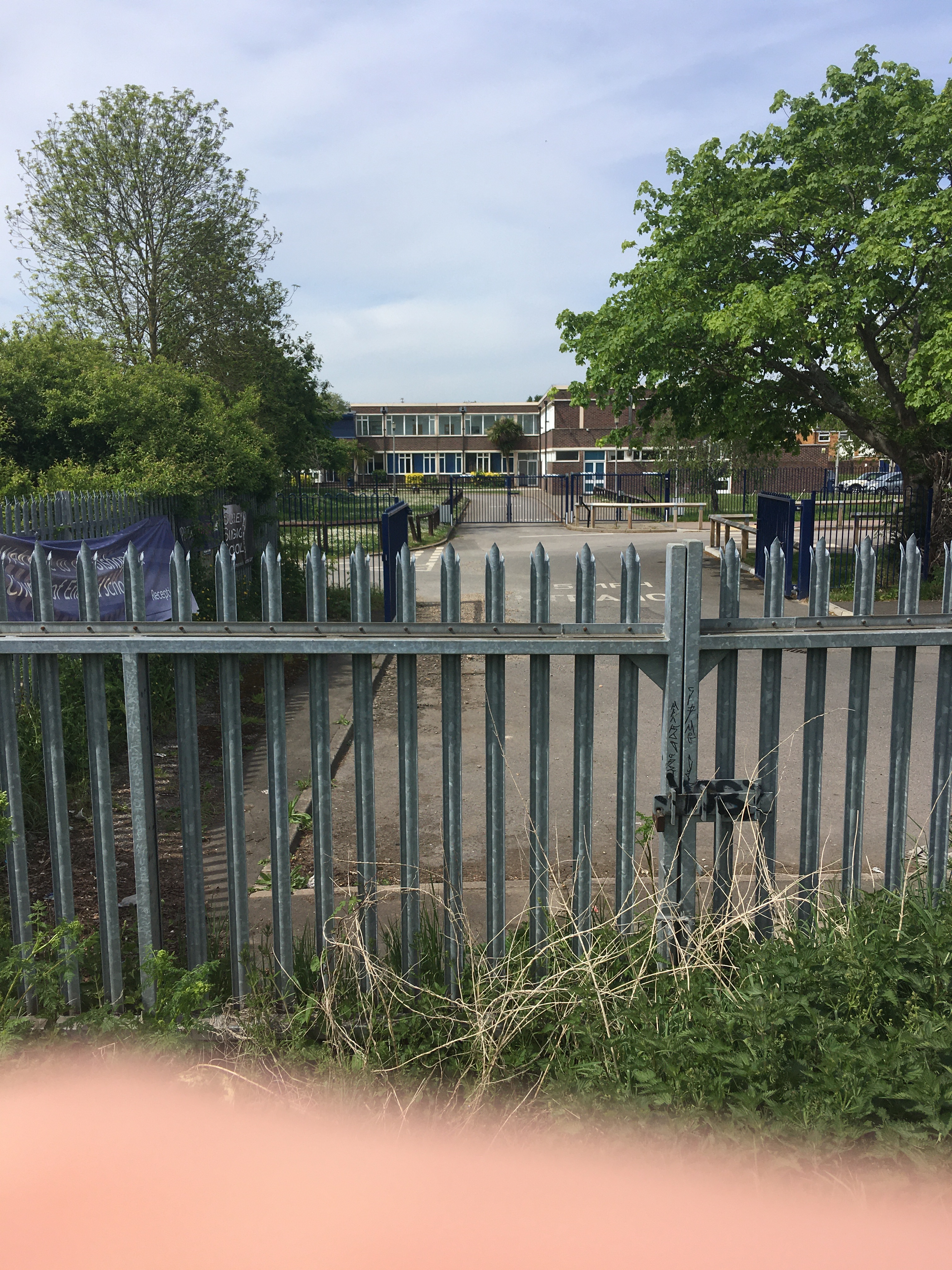
Access to the school is from this paved area to its east side; road access from there is to the north, Nursery Road, extra footpath access is to the east, Stratton Road

The Bishop Wand Church of England School is a secondary school with academy status located in Sunbury-on-Thames, England. The school has been co-educational since its founding and caters for students in the 11–18 age range in that it has its own sixth form. The school has seven houses, named after relevant Anglican dioceses to the life of its namesake, Bishop Wand, which compete in sports and other activities.

== History ==
The Bishop Wand Church of England School was founded in 1969 to serve, alongside non-Anglican schools and a few fellow Anglican-ethos schools, the borough of Spelthorne and the London Boroughs of Richmond upon Thames and Hounslow.

The prominent Anglican cleric for whom the school is named is Bishop William Wand who served 22 years as a Bishop then resigned in 1956 to serve as Canon and Treasurer of St Paul's Cathedral in London. His first position was Archbishop of Brisbane and he finished in post as Bishop of London. He ministered to many people over his lifetime (1885 – 1977) and worked in many cities and towns. Bishop Wand School decided to choose some of the places where the Bishop visited and ministered as its House names.

A small minority of the parish land has long belonged to St Paul's in return for annual funding and the right to appoint the vicar: in 1222 the right to appoint the vicar of Sunbury-on-Thames was transferred along with the manor from Westminster Abbey to the body representing the cathedral, the Dean and Chapter of St. Paul's. By the agreement which gave effect to this St. Paul's were to appropriate the church, ordaining a perpetual and well-endowed vicarage. St Paul's at the direction of its Diocese of London gave up much of its remaining land to endow the school.

== Sixth Form ==
Bishop Wand Church of England School offers a sixth form to both internal and external students. The sixth form offers A-level, BTEC and vocational qualifications. It consists of two year groups, year 12 and 13 with a total of around 200 students.

The Director of the sixth form is Toby Wood who is assisted by the Head of Sixth form, Jane Anderson.

The Bishop Wand Sixth Form also offers a unique ACE Rugby programme in collaboration with Harlequins. The ACE programme used to be in collaboration with London Irish before London Irish liquidated, and the catchment area changed to Harlequins.

== Facilities ==
The facilities at the Bishop Wand Church of England School include a three-floor main building and buildings for:

- Languages
- Mathematics
- Sciences
- Humanities
- Arts and creative subjects
- IT Block
- Lunch hall
- Bishops Building
- Sports block

Other sports and fitness facilities include:

- AstroTurf courts
- Designated fields for outdoor sports.

== Notable alumni ==
- Adam London, cricketer
- Glenn Fabry, comic book artist
- Matthew Parker (priest), Bishop of Stafford
- Jack Taylor, Ipswich Town
- Elliot Williams, Harlequins F.C
- Afolabi Fasogbon, England U20 rugby player
- Ollie Allan, England U20 rugby player
