= Malcolm Graham (priest) =

The Ven. John Malcolm Alexander Graham (1 May 1851 – 2 December 1931) was Archdeacon of Stoke from 1908 until his death on 2 December 1931.

Graham was born in Margate, the son of Prebendary John Graham of Downpatrick, Ireland, who was Rector of the Church of St Chad, Lichfield, for 40 years. He was educated at Rossall School and Brasenose College, Oxford; and ordained in 1879. After a curacy at Newcastle-under-Lyme he held incumbencies at Burslem, Shrewton and Trentham.

He married Florence Louise Coghill. They had three sons, Major John Malcolm Graham, Rev. Eric Graham and Kenneth Graham. Their daughter, Ruth, died in 1914, ad his wife died in 1917.

Graham was struck by a car when he was walking home to the vicarage in Trentham the evening of 2 December 1931. Graham, whose vision had been declining, was trying to find his gate with an electric torch. He sustained a fractured skull and leg and died later that evening at Longton Cottage Hospital. The death was ruled an accident.

Church of England titles
Preceded by John Herbert	Archdeacon of Stoke; 1908–31	Succeeded by Douglas Henry Crick
