= John Waine =

English Anglican bishop (1930–2020)

The Right Reverend John Waine KCVO GCStJ
- Bishop of Chelmsford
- Diocese: Diocese of Chelmsford
- In office: 1986–1996
- Predecessor: John Trillo
- Successor: John Perry
- Other posts: Clerk of the Closet (1989–1996); Bishop of St Edmundsbury and Ipswich (1978–1986); Bishop of Stafford (1975–1978)

Orders
- Consecration: 24 June 1975

Personal details
- Born: 20 June 1930
- Died: 29 December 2020 (aged 90)
- Denomination: Anglican
- Children: Stephen Waine
- Education: University of Manchester

John Waine KCVO GCStJ (20 June 1930 – 29 December 2020) was Bishop of Chelmsford from 1986 to 1996; and previously Bishop of St Edmundsbury and Ipswich from 1978 to 1986, Bishop of Stafford, 1975–1978. He also served as Clerk of the Closet from 1989 to 1997, and in retirement served as a lay member on the Press Complaints Commission.

Educated at Prescot Grammar School and the University of Manchester, he studied for ordination at Ridley Hall, Cambridge before embarking on an ecclesiastical career with a curacy at St Mary's Church, West Derby, Liverpool; served a second curacy in Sutton Parish (in the same diocese); Incumbencies at Ditton, Southport and Kirkby in the same diocese followed, before consecration to the episcopate on 24 June 1975 by Donald Coggan, Archbishop of Canterbury, at St Paul's Cathedral. He was translated to become Bishop of St Edmundsbury and Ipswich in November 1978, serving until he became Bishop of Chelmsford in 1986. Having become Bishop of Chelmsford shortly beforehand at the confirmation of his election, he was enthroned at Chelmsford Cathedral on 31 May 1986 and he retired on 30 April 1996. He received an honorary doctorate from the University of Essex. Waine was also the Prelate of the Venerable Order of Saint John until 24 June 2007.

At Petertide 1984 (1 July), as Bishop of St Edmundsbury and Ipswich, he made his son, Stephen (now Vicar of the Piddle Valley, Hilton, Cheselbourne and Melcombe Horsey), a deacon, at St Edmundsbury Cathedral (by letters dimissory from the vacant See of Lichfield).

== Honours ==
On 15 November 1996, Waine was appointed Knight Commander of the Royal Victorian Order (KCVO). On 12 November 1999 he was appointed Bailiff Grand Cross of the Order of St John (GCStJ).

Honour Ribbons:

- : Knight Grand Cross of the Royal Victorian Order (GCVO)
- : Bailiff Grand Cross of the Order of St. John (GCStJ)

Church of England titles
Preceded by Richard Clitherow	Bishop of Stafford; 1975–1978	Succeeded by John Waller
Preceded by Leslie Brown	Bishop of St Edmundsbury and Ipswich; 1978–1986	Succeeded by John Dennis
Preceded by John Trillo	Bishop of Chelmsford; 1986–1996	Succeeded by John Perry
Preceded by John Bickersteth	Clerk of the Closet; 1989–1996	Succeeded by Jonathan Bailey
