= Oceana Company =

- Origin: Zwolle, Overijssel, Netherlands
- Genres: Indie rock, progressive rock
- Years active: 2004–2013
- Labels: Spacejam, Suburban
- Past members: Matthijs Herder; Michiel Ferweda; Han Schilder; Robert Koole

Oceana Company was a Dutch indie rock band comprising Matthijs Herder (vocals/guitar/mellotron), Michiel Ferweda (guitar), Han Schilder (bass guitar) & Robert Koole (drums). Their music is notable for its melancholic and psychedelic overtones, and the use of authentic keyboard instruments, such as a mellotron. Their 2008 debut album 'For The Boatman' was produced by Marcel v/d Vondervoort of Astrosoniq and released by Spacejam Records/Suburban Records. Their song 'Trenchfever' reached number 1 in the Dutch Indiechart in May 2008. In 2009 the band was selected for the Dutch Popronde 2009.

== Discography ==
=== Studio albums ===
1. Promo 2007 (EP), 2007
2. For The Boatman, 2008
