= Charles Abraham (bishop of Derby) =

British bishop (1857–1945)

- Bishop of Derby
- Abraham in 1910
- Church: Church of England
- Diocese: Bishop of Derby (suffragan)
- See: Diocese of Southwell

Personal details
- Born: 1857
- Died: 27 January 1945 (aged 87–88)
- Parents: Charles Abraham; Caroline Abraham
- Children: Philip Selwyn Abraham

Charles Thomas Abraham (1857 – 27 January 1945) was a British Anglican minister who served as the bishop of Derby from 1909 until 1927.

== Life ==
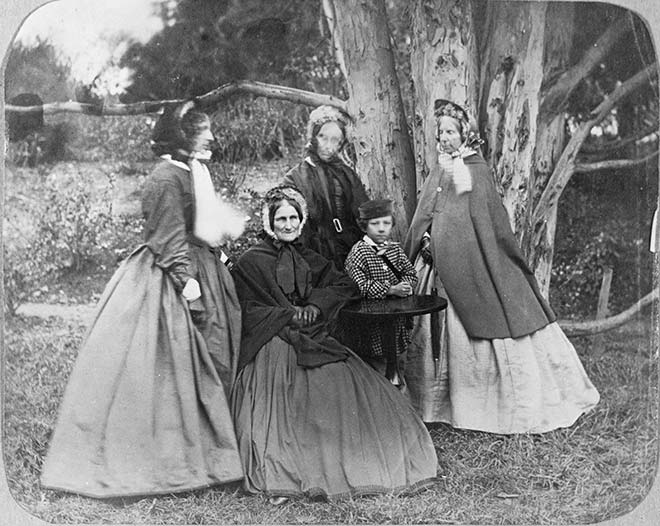
"Charlie" is the small boy. His mother is to the right

Abraham was born in 1857. He was the son of Charles and Caroline Abraham. He was educated at Keble College, Oxford. Ordained in 1881, he began his career with a curacy at St Mary's Church, Shrewsbury and was subsequently Vicar of All Saints, Shrewsbury and Christ Church, Lichfield before succeeding Edward Were as the bishop of Derby (suffragan). His father, Charles, and his son, Philip, were also bishops; another son, Geoffrey, was killed in action during the First World War. Another son, Jasper, was notorious for killing a Kenyan servant by flogging in 1923; the light sentence he received provoked a change in the legal system of Kenya Colony.

After Bishop Abraham retired, a cousin bequeathed Little Moreton Hall in Congleton to him. He died on 27 January 1945.

Church of England titles
| Preceded by Edward Were | Bishop suffragan of Derby; 1909–1927 | Diocese of Derby erected |
