= Stoke Minster =

Coordinates: 53°00′15″N 02°10′53″W

Minster Church of St Peter ad Vincula, Stoke-on-Trent
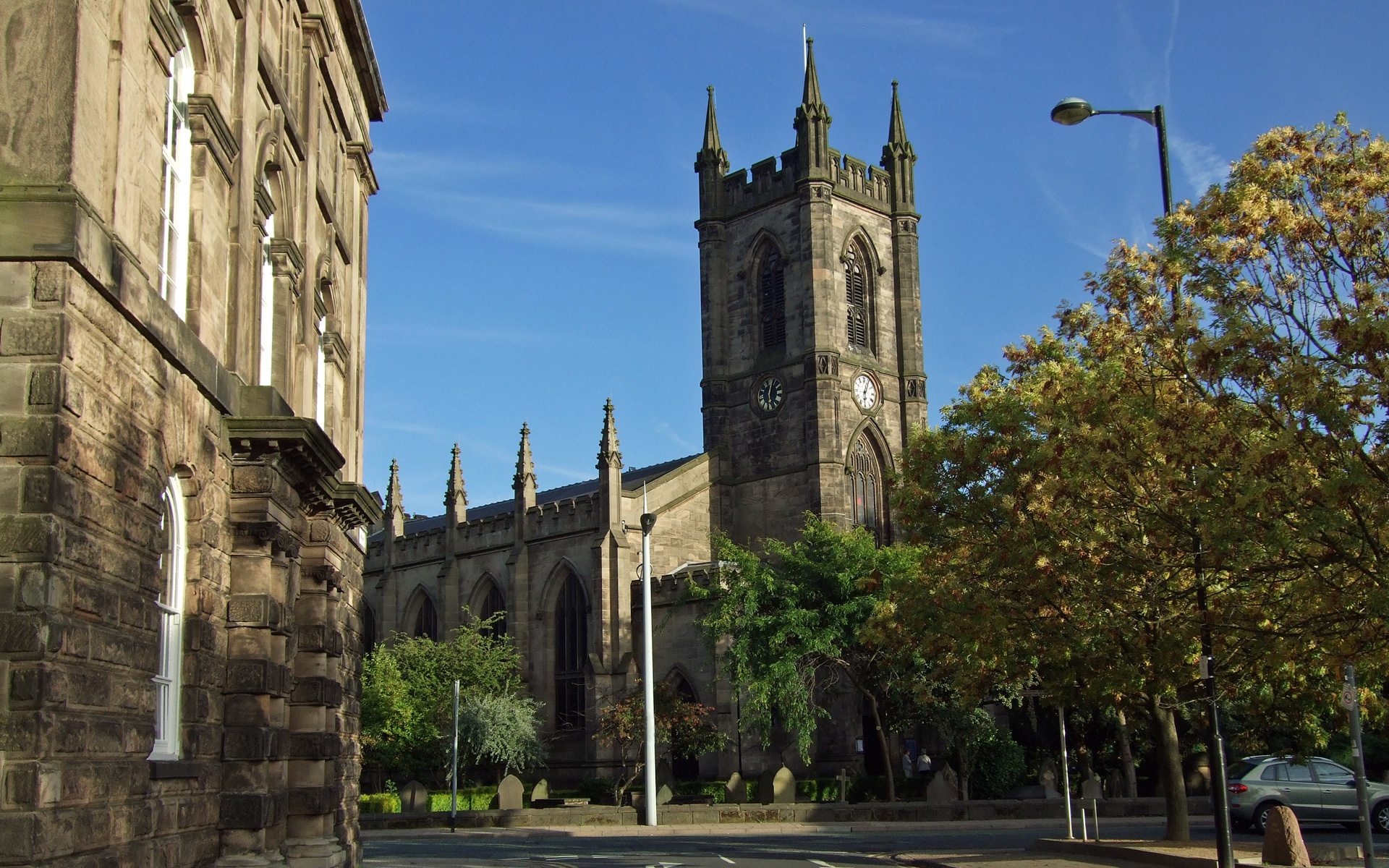
- Minster Church of St Peter ad Vincula, Stoke-on-Trent
- Denomination: Church of England
- Churchmanship: Broad Church
- Website: Stoke Minster

History
- Dedication: St Peter ad Vincula
- Consecrated: 6 October 1830

Architecture
- Heritage designation: Grade II listed
- Designated: 2 October 1951
- Architect(s): James Trubshaw, Thomas Johnson
- Style: Commissioners'; Gothic Revival

Administration
- Province: Canterbury
- Diocese: Lichfield
- Archdeaconry: Stoke
- Deanery: Stoke-on-Trent
- Parish: Stoke-on-Trent

Clergy
- Rector: Canon Andrew Wickens
- Priest: Rev Geoffrey Eze

Stoke Minster is the Minster church of St Peter ad Vincula and main church in Stoke-upon-Trent, Staffordshire, England. It is now the main church of the wider city of Stoke-on-Trent.

== Name and dedication ==
The dedication to St Peter ad Vincula means "Saint Peter in Chains". It is derived from the Basilica of San Pietro in Vincoli in Rome. The church was formally renamed Stoke Minster in 2005 in recognition of its role in the civic life of Stoke-on-Trent and north Staffordshire. The title "minster" is an honorific, sharing a common etymology with "monastery".

== History ==
The first church on the site was built of timber in 670. It was replaced with a stone building in 805 which was extended over the centuries. The remains of this Anglo-Saxon and former collegiate church survive in the churchyard. The re-erected arches date from the 13th century when the chancel was rebuilt. Saxon evidence survives in the baptismal font rescued from use as a garden ornament and restored in 1932 for baptismal use in the church.

The church is the burial place of several generations of Josiah Spode's family, as well as Josiah Wedgwood, who is also commemorated inside the church by a marble memorial tablet commissioned by his sons.

The title of "Stoke Minster" was conferred on the church by The Rt Revd Jonathan Gledhill, Bishop of Lichfield, at a ceremony on 17 May 2005.

== Building ==
James Trubshaw and Thomas Johnson (1794–1865) designed the present parish church. Building began in 1826 and the church was consecrated on 6 October 1830. In the church are ceramic memorials to many of the potters of the district and there is a modern memorial to the football player Sir Stanley Matthews.

The west tower has a ring of 10 bells, all of which John Taylor & Co of Loughborough recast in 1971. The tower has also a clock with a single bell, which John Taylor & Co cast in 1888.

The church has been a Grade II listed building since 2 October 1951.

== Organ ==
The organ was built in 1899 by J. J. Binns of Bramley, Leeds, as a house organ for the master potter H. J. Johnson. Johnson gave the organ to the church in 1921 as a memorial to members of his family who died in World War I. It was installed, unchanged, on the west gallery. It was rebuilt with substantial changes by J. W. Walker & Sons Ltd in 1972. The specifications of the organ are recorded at the National Pipe Organ Register.
