= Douglas Crick =

English Anglican bishop (1885–1973)

Douglas Henry Crick (1885-1973) was the Anglican Bishop of Chester from 1939 until 1955.

== Family and education ==
Crick was born in 1885, the third child and second son of the Reverend Philip Crick, the founder and first Headmaster (1883-1909) of St Ronan's School. A strongly clerical family, his relations included the Rev’d Thomas Crick (great grandfather), the Rev’d Henry William Crick (grandfather), the Rev’d Philip Crick (father), the Rev’d Frederick William Crick (uncle), and the Rev’d John Henry Crick (uncle). His only brother, Philip Crick, was also ordained, and eventually became the Bishop of Ballarat.

He was educated first at his father's school, and then at Winchester College, and New College, Oxford.

== Career ==
He began his ordained ministry as a chaplain to the Mersey Mission for Seamen. A curacy at Maltby followed before a period in education at his old school, Winchester College. From there he was successively vicar of Wednesbury, Archdeacon of Stoke and the suffragan Bishop of Stafford before becoming the diocesan Bishop of Chester.

In retirement he was an honorary assistant bishop of the Diocese of Gloucester. He died in 1973.

== Private life ==
He was a Freemason in the jurisdiction of the United Grand Lodge of England, holding a number of senior masonic appointments in Cheshire including that of Third Provincial Grand Principal in the Holy Royal Arch.

Church of England titles
Preceded by Lionel Payne Crawfurd	Bishop of Stafford; 1934–1938	Succeeded by Lemprière Durell Hammond
Preceded by Geoffrey Fisher	Bishop of Chester; 1939–1955	Succeeded by Gerald Ellison
