= Trust money =

In Australia, trust money in the legal industry is the money a law practice holds on behalf of a client or other people in the course of, or in connection with, the provision of legal services. Trust money is required to be held by a law firm on a client's behalf in a trust account with a bank and is highly regulated. A lawyer or law firm should not appropriate a client's trust money until certain regulations are met, which are different for each state in Australia. The Australian system regulating lawyers and their trust accounts has been labeled by the Rudd Government as an "unwieldy monster".

== Uses of trust money ==
Trust money is held to cover the practitioner’s fees and disbursements over a period of time and may be required to be topped up as a matter progresses.

== Regulations for handling trust money in Australia ==
The accounting of trust money is highly regulated and even though the money is controlled by the law practice the money still belongs to the client until such time as it is applied to an invoice or disbursement. The exact regulations in Australia are different for each state, in everything from cost disclosure to trust accounting, which lawyers say cause inefficiencies and cost clients millions of dollars every year.

Prior to 1976, it was not uncommon for solicitors to pay their costs and disbursements from trust money without obtaining the client's instructions to do so. The profession-at-large now accepts that this practice is unlawful and that prior instructions must be obtained.

After a 1976 New South Wales Supreme Court decision it appeared that withdrawals by a lawyer from a trust account could only be made in two situations:

- the client has given clear instructions to that effect; or
- the solicitor has a "particular lien", and obtained a court order entitling him or her to withdraw the money.

In 1978 the law societies in Victoria and South Australia advised their members that they should "issue a bill of costs to the client wherever costs are taken from the trust account and not take such costs until the client has had proper opportunity to object".

In 1984 the New South Wales Law Reform Commission published the "Fourth Report on the Legal Profession: Solicitors' Trust Accounts". Chapter five of that report was titled "Handling Trust Money: Issues Relating to Costs and Disbursements" and discussed many issues relating to trust accounts in NSW and around Australia.

The national legal profession model bill, which was supposed to eliminate the differences, took about ten years to develop and was finally signed off by the Standing Committee of Attorneys General, (SCAG), in 2011. All Australian States and Territories except South Australia have during 2004 to 2008 adopted the national legal profession model.

== Withdrawing trust money for legal costs in Australia ==
State	NSW	Vic	Qld	WA	SA	Tas	ACT	NT
Year of current Legal Profession Act	2004	2004	2007	2008	1981	2007	2006	2006
Act based on National Model	Yes	Yes	Yes	Yes	No	Yes	Yes	Yes
Time to object after delivery of bill	7 days	7 days	7 days	7 days	?	7 days	7 days	7 days
Time to apply for review	60 days	60 days	60 days	60 days	?	60 days	60 days	60 days

=== New South Wales ===
In New South Wales trust money is regulated by the Legal Profession Act 2004 and the Legal Profession Regulation 2005.

If you receive a bill from your solicitor and want to challenge a withdrawal, you have seven days to make your objection known. If you do not lodge an application for a cost assessment with the Supreme Court of NSW within sixty days after being given the bill, the solicitor will be able to withdraw the money from the trust account.

=== Victoria ===
In Victoria trust money is regulated by the Legal Profession Act 2004 and the Legal Profession Regulations 2005.

The law practice may withdraw the trust money if the practice has given the person a bill relating to the money and if the person has not objected to withdrawal of the money within seven days after being given the bill or the person has objected within seven days after being given the bill but has not applied for a review of the legal costs under the Act within sixty days after being given the bill.

=== Queensland ===
In Queensland trust money is regulated by the Legal Profession Act 2007 and the Legal Profession Regulation 2007.

The law practice may withdraw the trust money if the practice has given the person a bill relating to the money and if the person has not objected to withdrawal of the money within seven days after being given the bill or the person has objected within seven days after being given the bill but has not applied for a review of the legal costs under the Act within sixty days after being given the bill.

=== Western Australia ===
In Western Australia trust money is regulated by the Legal Profession Act 2008 and the Legal Profession Regulations 2009.

The law practice may withdraw the trust money if the practice has given the person a bill relating to the money and if the person has not objected to withdrawal of the money within seven days after being given the bill or the person has objected within seven days after being given the bill but has not applied for a review of the legal costs under the Act within sixty days after being given the bill.

=== South Australia ===
In South Australia trust money is regulated by the Legal Practitioners Act, 1981 and the Legal Practitioners Regulations 2009.

SA is yet to push the national legal profession model bill through parliament, because of a political deadlock over compensation for victims of trust account fraud.

A legal practitioner or law firm cannot appropriate money from a clients trust account in or towards satisfaction of a claim for legal costs unless a bill specifying the total amount of those costs, and describing the legal work to which the costs relate, has been delivered to the person liable to the costs either personally, or by post addressed to the person at the person's last known place of business or residence. The person liable to legal costs may at any time within six months after delivery of a bill of costs request the person claiming to be entitled to the costs to provide a statement showing in detail how the amount of the costs to which the bill relates is made up.

In 2012 the Law Society of South Australia published a fact sheet on appropriating Trust Money for Payment of Fees. The fact sheet explains that if a practitioner posts a bill for fees to a client, it is not legally considered to have been "delivered" in accordance with section 41(1) of the Act, until the minimum amount of time in which the bill would be delivered in the ordinary course of post has passed. The Law Society recommends that 3 business days be allowed to pass after posting the bill before appropriation of trust money towards that bill. Further, the Law Society states that if the client objects to the bill the trust money should remain in trust.

=== Tasmania ===
In Tasmania trust money is regulated by the Legal Profession Act 2007 and the Legal Profession Regulations 2007.

The law practice may withdraw trust money if the practice has given the person a bill, written request for payment or notice of proposed withdrawal relating to the money and the person has not objected to withdrawal of the money within seven days after being given the bill, request or notice the person has objected within seven days after being given the bill, request or notice but has not applied for a review of the legal costs under the Act within sixty days after being given the bill, request or notice.

=== Australian Capital Territory ===
In the Australian Capital Territory trust money is regulated by the Legal Profession Act 2006 and the Legal Profession Regulations 2006.

The law practice may withdraw the trust money if the practice has given the person a bill relating to the money and if the person has not objected to withdrawal of the money not later than seven days after being given the bill or the person has objected not later than seven days after being given the bill but has not applied for a review of the legal costs under the Act not later than sixty days after being given the bill.

=== Northern Territory ===
In the Northern Territory trust money is regulated by the Legal Profession Act and the Legal Profession Regulations.

The law practice may withdraw the trust money if the practice has given the person a bill relating to the money and if the person has not objected to withdrawal of the money within seven days after being given the bill or the person has objected within seven days after being given the bill but has not applied for a review of the legal costs under the Act within sixty days after being given the bill.

== Disputes over trust money ==
In Australia if a dispute arises over the accounting or application of the trust money the client should notify the appropriate Law Society.

One high-profile South Australian case was with Brenton Willoughby, a law clerk at Magarey Farlam Lawyers, and involved $4.5 million.

Another high-profile South Australian case was the "Stashed cash affair" involving the Crown Solicitors Trust Account. The South Australian Attorney-General at the time, Michael Atkinson, likened his Supreme Court cross-examination over the "stashed cash affair" to being "tortured with a comfy cushion".

In 2009 a Perth lawyer was charged with stealing $11,000 from a trust account.

In South Australia in 2010, in Australia's most expensive divorce, claims of overcharging and discrepancies handling trust money were made.

A high-profile case of mishandling trust money was in Queensland, where a Logan councilor Hajnal Black was found to have mishandled trust money for a dementia patient. Ms Black was found guilty of four charges relating to pecuniary interests and fined $5,000.

A New South Wales / Victoria case was the small legal firm Tietyens' practice in Albury on the New South Wales / Victoria border. Tietyens ran a contributory mortgage scheme backed by about 1,100 investors that furnished an investment of about $42 million in the Tally Ho Retirement Village in Burwood East in Melbourne.

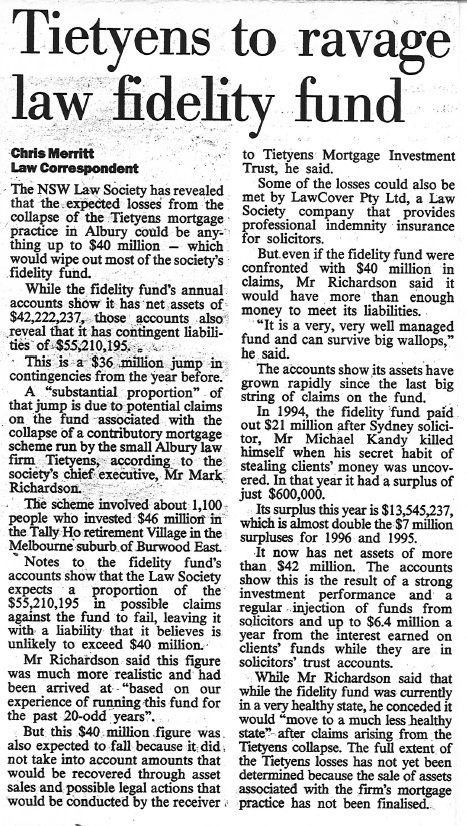
Tietyens defalcation

A New South Wales Criminal lawyer, Brett Galloway, was found guilty in 2012 for charges relating to his trust account handling.

Another high-profile case was that of a Perth lawyer, Lloyd Rayney, who was charged with murder of his wife, but found not guilty of the murder in late 2012. During Rayney's murder investigation, trust money anomalies in his 2 daughter's trust accounts were found. They had received payments of more than $200,000 from one of Mr Rayney's biggest clients, Gina Rinehart's Hancock Prospecting.

== Legal Practitioners' Guarantee Fund ==
In South Australia in the 1960s a guarantee fund was set up from a percentage of the interest made on clients' money while in legal trust accounts. The guarantee fund is administered by the Law Society and is used to fund consumer protection services such as the Legal Practitioners Conduct Board and to make hardship payments when people have lost money from legal trust accounts.

== Solicitors Guarantee Fund, Victoria ==
Until the mid-1990s there was a Solicitors Guarantee Fund in Victoria (SGF). From the mid-1990s, after the relevant Victorian legislation was changed, the Legal Practitioners Fidelity Fund (LPFF) came into being in place of the SGF. The legal interpretation of the two words effected by the change from SGF to LPFF is significant. "Guarantee" and "fidelity" do not mean the same thing. By implication the new fidelity fund did not provide a guarantee, the financial considerations are different with on the one hand liability of the fund vis-a-vis fidelity being limited to a finite amount, and on the other hand, in earlier times – the "guarantee era" – liability of the fund being unlimited.

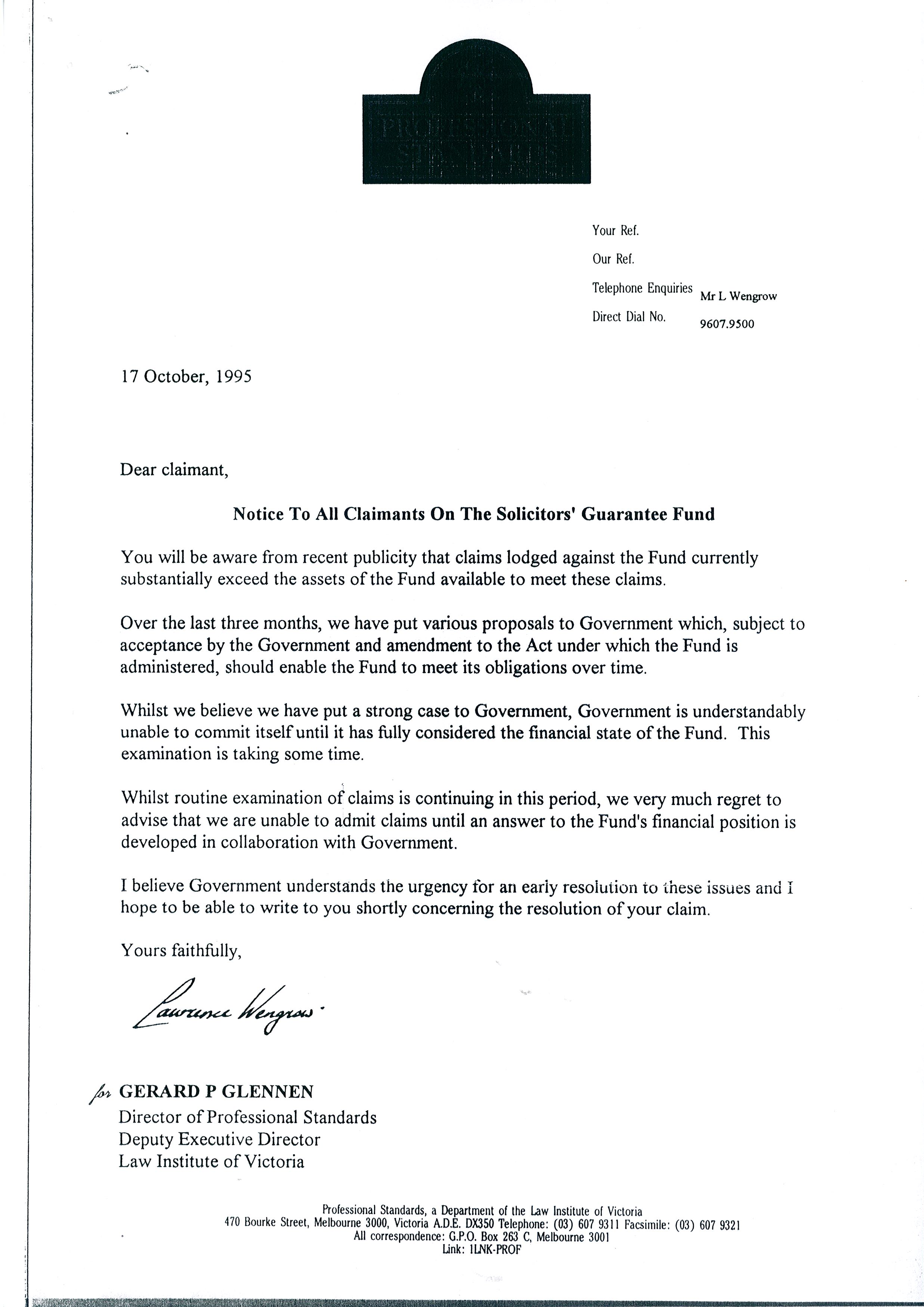
Notice to all Claimants - Solicitors Guarantee Fund depleted

During the early to mid-1990s the amount of clients' money being lost at the hands of some Victorian solicitors became so large that the Solicitors Guarantee Fund began running year-in year-out in deficit, since it did not have sufficient income to meet the gross admitted claims against the fund.

One of about a dozen major contributors to the ongoing deficit situation was Dudley Tregent & Co, which involved defalcations of between $10 million and $14 million of clients' funds.

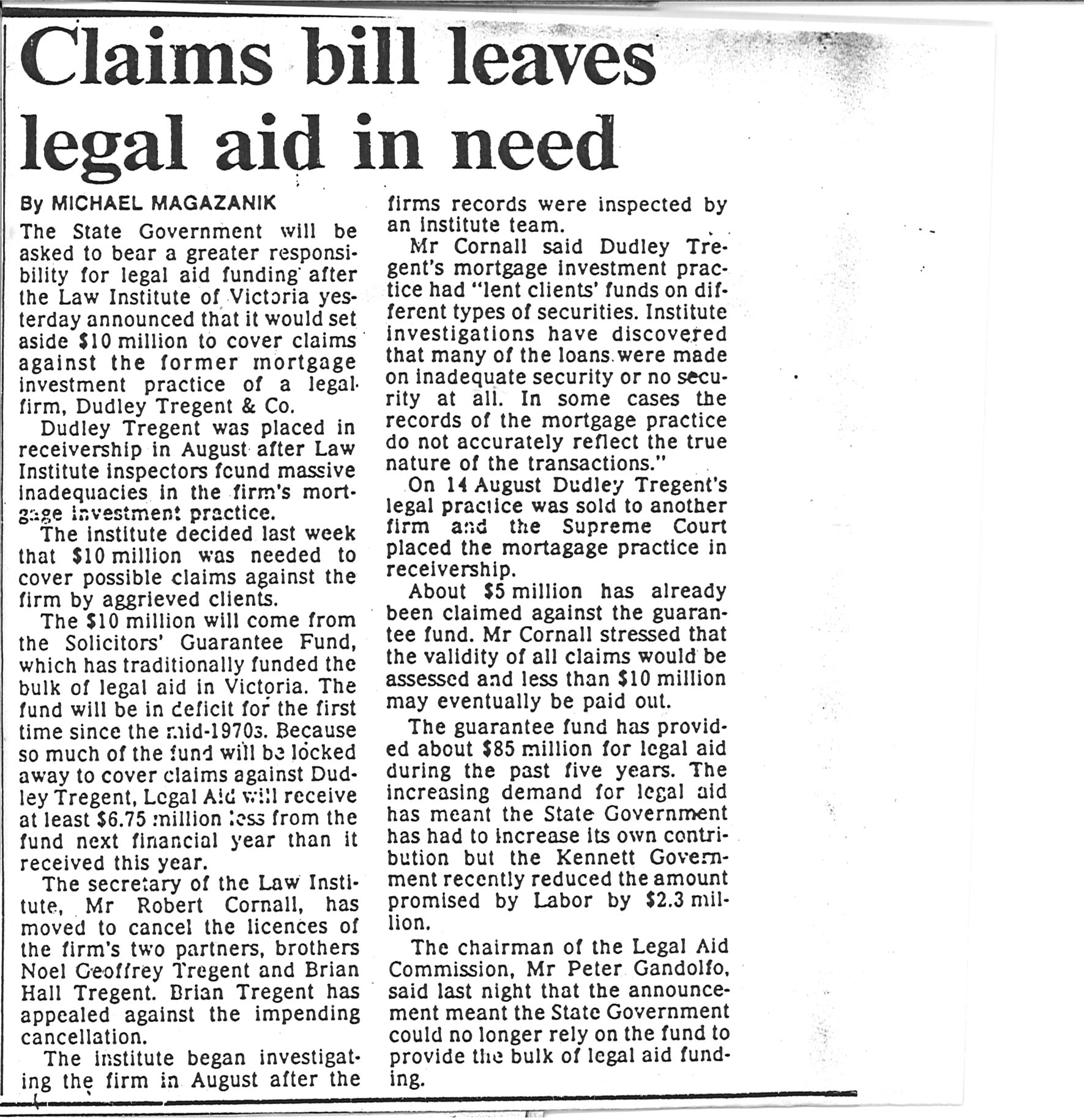
Dudley Tregent & Co Solicitors Guarantee Fund

The core amount of $10 million to $14 million was topped up by a further $3 million or so in interest payable on claims because of the time it took to settle admitted claims, a period of 6 years from 1992 to 1998, while interest was accruing on the pending payouts at a statutory rate of 5% per annum.

Another ten or so other significant cases of solicitors losing clients' funds took place in the 1990s.

A further Melbourne case was the murder of Max Green in Phnom Penh. Max Green was a partner in the law firm Aroni Colman. In the Max Green case the amount lost was estimated at $38 million, ostensibly the $38 million was for the purchase of plant and equipment to be then leased to Transurban. Transurban denied any knowledge of this leasing arrangement. Some of the clients of Mr Green who lost their money in this case were other solicitors.

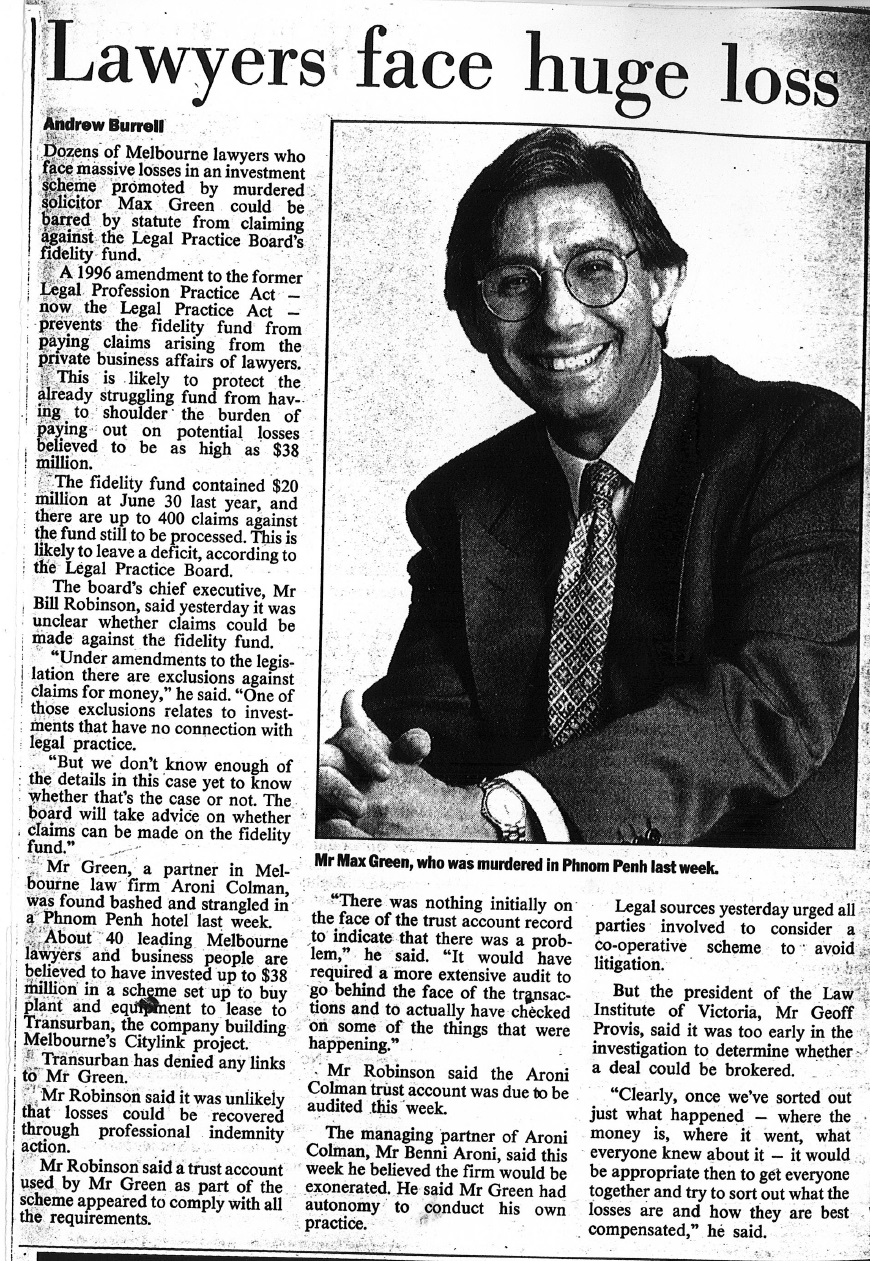
The Max Green Case

Other cases included: Savas Christodolou, Richard Makarucha, Romuald Martin, Geoffrey Ogge, Ronald Silverstein, Stanley Rosenberg

In general, the fidelity funds or guarantee funds do not admit claims involving criminal conduct or dishonest conduct on the part of the lawyers. Fidelity funds ironically are not designed to rectify infidelities, rather they cater for losses arising from honest mistakes by lawyers and/or their lack of investment acumen.

== Positive dormant balance at end of matter ==
If there remains a positive dormant balance in a clients trust account at the end of a matter, the client is entitled to the return of that trust money as soon as practicable. In 2012 South Australian Law Society director of Professional Standards, Ros Burke, advised practitioners that they could use the Unclaimed Money Act to clear the balance. By charging a fee to try to locate the client that the trust money belongs to, as long as the fee is generated in accordance with the appropriate Legal Practitioners Act, the practitioner can appropriate that sum out of the dormant trust money.
