= Bishop of Stafford =

Title of a suffragan bishop of Lichfield

The Bishop of Stafford is an episcopal title used by a suffragan bishop of the Church of England Diocese of Lichfield, in the Province of Canterbury, England. The title takes its name after Stafford, the county town of Staffordshire. The Bishop of Stafford has particular episcopal oversight of the parishes in the Archdeaconry of Stoke. Matthew Parker has been in post since 2021; the bishops suffragan of Stafford have been area bishops since the Lichfield area scheme was erected in 1992, presiding over the Stafford Episcopal Area, which is coterminous with the Archdeaconry of Stoke.

Bishops of Stafford
From	Until	Incumbent	Notes
1909	1915	Edward Were	(1846–1915). Formerly Bishop of Derby
1915	1934	Lionel Crawfurd	(1864–1934)
1934	1938	Douglas Crick	(1885–1973). Translated to Chester
1938	1958	Lemprière Hammond	(1881–1965)
1958	1974	Richard Clitherow	(1909–1984)
1975	1978	John Waine	(1930-2020). Translated to St Edmundsbury and Ipswich
1979	1987	John Waller	(1924–2015)
1987	1995	Michael Scott-Joynt	(1943–2014). First area bishop from 1992; translated to Winchester.
1996	2004	Christopher Hill	(b. 1945). Translated to Guildford
2005	2010	Gordon Mursell	(b. 1949)
2010	2019	Geoff Annas	(b. 1953) Retired 30 November 2019.
2021	present	Matthew Parker	Consecrated 14 April 2021.
