= Re Diplock =

English legal case

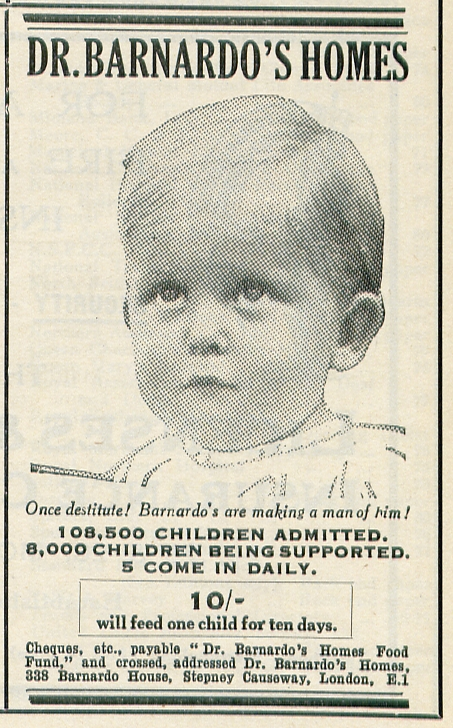
- Court: House of Lords
- Full case name: Ministry of Health v Simpson (sub nom Re Diplock)
- Citation: [1951] AC 251

Case history
- Prior action: [1948] Ch 465

Keywords
- Tracing

Re Diplock or Chichester Diocesan Fund and Board of Finance Inc v Simpson [1944] AC 341 is an English trusts law and unjust enrichment case, concerning tracing and an action for money had and received.

== Facts ==
Various charities, including the Royal Sailors Orphans Girls’ School and Home and Dr Barnardo’s Homes had wrongly been paid money by personal representatives under Mr Caleb Diplock’s will, which left £263,000. The representatives mistakenly believed a clause in the will was valid. Some money went to be used to improve and repair other property. But the trust was held to be invalid in a decision of the House of Lords, called Chichester Diocesan Fund and Board of Finance Incorporated v Simpson. The next of kin, including Cornelius Simpson, claimed that the money should be repaid by the recipients.

== Judgment ==
=== Court of Appeal ===
The Court of Appeal rejected the claimant’s claim for a charge over newly built buildings. It allowed a claim for equitable tracing in the mixed funds held by the charities. For mixed funds not held in current accounts, as for Royal Sailor’s, the claimants held a proportionate share. For funds held in current accounts, as for Dr Barnado’s, the first in first out rule was applicable.

Lord Greene MR said the following.

The owner of a house who, as an innocent volunteer, has trust money in his hands given to him by a trustee uses that money in making an alteration to his house so as to fit it better to his own personal needs. The result may add not one penny to the value of the house. Indeed the alteration may well lower its value… Can it be said in such cases that the trust money can be traced and extracted from the altered asset? Clearly not, for the money will have disappeared leaving no monetary trace behind… But it is not merely a question of locating and identifying the… money. The result of a declaration of charge is to disentangle trust money and enable it to be withdrawn in the shape of money from the complex in which it has become involved. This can only be done by sale under the charge… But if what the volunteer has contributed is not money but other property of his own such as land, what then? … Is it equitable to compel the innocent volunteer to take a charge merely for the value of the land when what he has contributed is the land itself? … In our opinion it cannot.

Wrottesley LJ and Evershed LJ concurred.

=== House of Lords ===
The House of Lords upheld Court of Appeal that the next of kin, including Simpson, had a personal equitable remedy against the charities to recover the money, once the claims against the personal representatives were exhausted.

Lord Simonds discussed why a mistake of law was different from a mistake of fact, because ignorantia juris neminem excusat. He then continued on the question of receiving property.

The Court of Chancery, it was said, acted upon the conscience, and, unless the defendant had behaved in an unconscientious manner, would make no decree against him. The appellant or those through whom he claimed, having received a legacy in good faith and having spent it without knowledge of any flaw in their title, ought not in conscience to be ordered to refund. My Lords, I find little help in such generalities. Upon the propriety of a legatee refusing to repay to the true owner the money that he has wrongly received I do not think it necessary to express any judgment. It is a matter on which opinions may well differ. The broad fact remains that the Court of Chancery, in order to mitigate the rigour of the common law or to supply its deficiencies, established the rule of equity which I have described and this rule did not excuse the wrongly paid legatee from repayment because he had spent what he had been wrongly paid. No doubt the plaintiff might by his conduct and particularly by laches have raised some equity against himself; but if he had not done so, he was entitled to be repaid. In the present case the respondents have done nothing to bar them in equity from asserting their right.

Lord Normand, Lord Oaksey, Lord Morton and Lord MacDermott concurred.

== See also ==
- English trusts law
