= Administration in United Kingdom law =

Procedure in UK insolvency law

Administration in United Kingdom law is the main kind of procedure in UK insolvency law when a company is unable to pay its debts. The management of the company is usually replaced by an insolvency practitioner whose statutory duty is to rescue the company, save the business, or get the best result possible. While creditors with a security interest over all a company's assets could control the procedure previously through receivership, the Enterprise Act 2002 made administration the main procedure.

== History ==
The Insolvency Act 1986, Schedule B1 contains the procedure for a company entering administration, as updated by the Enterprise Act 2002. It was first introduced following the Cork Report's priorities for transparency, accountability and collectivity and, crucially, fostering a rescue culture for business.

== Appointment ==
In general the conditions for a court to grant an administration order are first, whether the company is insolvent, or 'is or is likely to become unable to pay its debts'. Second, it has to be shown that one of the purposes of administration in paragraph 3 will be achieved. In Re Harris Simons Construction Ltd Hoffmann J held that 'likely to achieve the purpose of administration' meant a test lower than balance of probabilities, and more like whether there was a 'real prospect' of success or a 'good arguable case' for it. So here the company was granted an administration order, which led to its major creditor granting funding to continue four building contracts.

=== Floating charge holders ===
When applying to the court, the petitioners for administration may be either the company's directors, or any creditor. But an important change since the Enterprise Act 2002 is that it is also possible for a director and, crucially, the holder of a floating charge over the company's whole property to apply for appointment of an administrator out of court. If a director applies for an out of court appointment, they must give 5 days' notice to any such qualifying floating chargee, who may in turn intervene in court to have their own 'specified person' appointed as the administrator. The court may refuse if the 'particular circumstances of the case' (undefined) suggest otherwise. The effect is that the holder of a qualifying floating charge is in a robust position to have their preferred insolvency practitioner installed.

=== Pre-packaged administration ===
Because an administrator can, since the Enterprise Act 2002, be appointed out of court, a new practice of pre-packaged administration became increasingly popular, whereby typically the company directors negotiate with a prospective administrator for the sale of the business to take place immediately after entering administration, and often to the company's former management. The perceived benefits of this practice, originating in the 1980s in the United States, is that a quick sale without hiring lawyers and expending time or business assets through formalities, can be effected to keep the business running and employees in their jobs.

The potential downside is that because a deal is already agreed among the controlling interested parties (directors, insolvency practitioners and usually the major secured creditor) before broader consultation, unsecured creditors are left behind as the momentum behind the deal carries events forward. The concern in the business community is thus that a plan gets foisted on creditors without much time for consideration that works most in favour of the people who ran the company or the large secured lender. In Re Kayley Vending Ltd, which concerned an in-court appointed administrator, HH Judge Cooke held that a court will ensure that applicants for a prepack administration provide enough information for a court to conclude that the scheme is not being used to disadvantage unsecured creditors. Moreover, while the costs of arranging the prepack before entering administration will count for the purpose of administrator's expenses, it is less likely to do so if the business is sold to the former management. Here the sale of a cigarette vending machine business was to the company's competitors, and so the deal was sufficiently "arm's length" to raise no concern. In their conduct of meetings, the Court of Appeal made clear in Revenue and Customs Commissioners v Maxwell that administrators appointed out of court will be scrutinised in the way they treat unsecured creditors. Here the administrator did not treat the Revenue as having sufficient votes against the company's management buyout proposal, but the court substituted its judgment and stated the number of votes allowed should take account of events all the way in the run up to the meeting, including in this case the Revenue's amended claim for unlawful tax deductions to the managers' trust funds and loans to directors.

== Moratorium ==
When an administrator is appointed, they will replace the directors. Under paragraph 40, creditors are precluded by a statutory moratorium from bringing enforcement procedures to recover their debts, including a bar on secured creditors taking and or selling assets subject to security with leave of the court. The moratorium is fundamental to keeping the business's assets intact and giving the company a "breathing space" for the purpose of a restructure, and even extends to a moratorium on the enforcement of criminal proceedings. So in Environmental Agency v Clark, the Court of Appeal held that the Environment Agency needed court approval to bring a prosecution against a polluting company, though in the circumstances leave was granted. In Re Atlantic Computer Systems Ltd (No 1), the company in administration had sublet computers that were owned by a set of banks who wanted to repossess them. Nicholls LJ, in outlining the considerations for giving leave to execute repossession, held that leave should be given if it would not impede the administration's purpose, and while the banks were bound to apply for permission, discretion was exercised in their favour. The moratorium is effective for a default, but extendable, period of one year.

== Administrators' duties ==
Just as for directors' duties in UK company law, an administrator owes its duties to the company, and to the court. In Oldham v Kyrris it was held that creditors may not sue administrators directly in their own capacity, because the duty is owed to the company. In this case, a former employee of a Burger King franchise with an equitable charge for £270,000 for unpaid wages could not sue the administrator directly, outside the terms of the statutory standard, unless responsibility had been directly assumed to him.

=== Rescue the company ===
While the moratorium is in effect the administrator's core purpose and duty under paragraph 3 is to rescue the company, or if impracticable, typically transfer the business as a going concern, or as a last resort break up the business and distribute proceeds to creditors. This and other duties, found in Schedule B1, paragraph 3, are theoretically meant to be exercised for the benefit of the creditors as a whole. There is some tension, however, between the duties on paper, and the administrator being appointed in fact by secured creditors, or through a pre-packaged insolvency.

Once in place, the first task of an administrator is to design a restructuring proposal. This should be given to the registrar and unsecured creditors within 8 weeks, followed by a creditor vote to approve the plans by simple majority. If creditors do not approve the court may make an order as it sees fit. Until then, the powers of administrator extend under Schedule B1, paragraph 59 to 'anything necessary or expedient for the management of the affairs, business and property of the company'.

In Re Transbus International Ltd Lawrence Collins J made the point that the rules on administration were intended to be "a more flexible, cheaper and comparatively informal alternative to liquidation" and so with regard to doing what is expedient "the fewer applications which need to be made to the court the better." This wide discretion of the administrator to manage the company is reflected also in paragraph 3(3)-(4), whereby the administrator may choose between which result (whether saving the company, selling the business, or winding down) "he thinks" subjectively is most appropriate. This places an administrator in an analogous position to a company director.

=== Duty of care ===
An administrator's further duties allow a broad scope for the administrator to exercise good business judgment. An administrator is subject to a duty to perform her functions as 'quickly and efficiently as is reasonably practicable', and must also not act so as to 'unfairly harm' a creditor's interests. In Re Charnley Davies Ltd (No 2) the administrator sold the insolvent company's business at an allegedly undervalued price, which creditors alleged breached his duty to not unfairly harm them. Millett J held the standard of care was not breached, and was the same standard of care as in professional negligence cases of an "ordinary, skilled practitioner". He emphasized that courts should not judge decisions which may turn out sub-optimal with the benefit of hindsight. Here the price was the best possible in the circumstances.

== See also ==
- United Kingdom insolvency law
- United Kingdom company law
