= Boyo =

Boyo may refer to:

== Places ==
- Boyo (department), a division of the Northwest province in Cameroon
- Bōyo Islands, a group of islands in the Inland Sea, Japan
- Boyo, Central African Republic, a village in the Central African Republic

== People ==
- Billy Boyo (1969–2000), Jamaican reggae artist
- Ego Boyo (born 1968), Nigerian actress and movie producer
- Boyo Ockinga (active from 1986), New Zealand-born egyptologist, epigrapher and philologist working in Australia

== Other ==
- Boyo, an Irish and Welsh variation on the word boy
- Boyo v London Borough of Lambeth, a 1994 UK labour law case, concerning wrongful dismissal
- Boyo, a Surinamese dessert cake made of coconut and cassava; see Culture of Suriname § Cuisine
