= Mothew v Bristol & West Building Society =

English legal case on professional neligence and fiduciary duty of solicitors

Bristol & West BS v Mothew
- Court: Court of Appeal
- Citations: [1998] EWCA Civ 533, [1998] Ch 1

Case history
- Prior actions: Millett LJ, Staughton LJ, Otton LJ

Case opinions
- Millett LJ

Keywords
- Fiduciary duty

Bristol and West Building Society v Mothew [1996] EWCA Civ 533 is a leading English fiduciary law and professional negligence case, concerning a solicitor's duty of care and skill, and the nature of fiduciary duties. The case is globally cited for its definition of a fiduciary and the circumstances in which a fiduciary relationship arises.

== Facts ==
Mr Mothew was a solicitor who had acted for both borrower and lender in a mortgage transaction relating to the purchase of a residential property. It was alleged that he negligently told the building society that there was no second charge on the house when the mortgage agreement was signed. At the time of reporting to the building society and requesting its funding, unbeknown to Mr Mothew, the borrower had a relatively small bank overdraft facility limited to £2,000. After completion of the purchase and mortgage (at which time the lender's funds were applied to the transaction) but before the transactions were registered at Land Registry Mr Mothew was approached by the borrower's bankers (Barclays) to say that they were granting a second mortgage facility to the borrower and seeking that their second charge be registered at Land Registry. The second charge documentation had been prepared and executed by the borrower at the bank's premises. By registering the second charge documentation contemporaneously with the purchase and (first) mortgage there was a waiver of fees payable to the Land Registry thereby saving expense for the borrower than if the second charge had been registered separately later. The Cheshunt Building Society were asked by Mr Mothew to consent to registration of the second charge which they did and they were also given formal notice of the second charge which they acknowledged. Mr Mothew delayed sending the application to the registry whilst the lender's consent was being obtained since it was also required to be lodged at the Land Registry. At the time of their default the borrower's overdraft facility had risen from £2,000 to £3,350. The housing market collapsed, and the homeowners (having lost their employment in the recession) defaulted on their mortgage with the building society. To realise their money, the building society had the property sold off for £53,000 in February 1991, a considerable time after they had taken possession of it. The lender claimed that if it had known of the borrower's overdraft facility, it would not have granted its mortgage to the borrower. They sued Mothew for the sum they lent (£59,000) less the proceeds of the sale.

Mothew argued that Bristol and West had been aware of the second charge and even if it had not known, it would still have proceeded with the transaction and suffered the same loss, because in 1988 when the transaction was going through, the market was buoyant and the extent of the borrower's overdraft facility was commonplace. This would mean no damages would be recoverable at common law, for there would be no causal connection with Mothew's (alleged) negligence and the building society's loss. At first instance he was unsuccessful. However his professional indemnity insurers took the matter to the Court of Appeal where three judges unanimously supported Mr Mothew (see Judgment below) and the case was referred back, ultimately resulting in a settlement whereby no penalty or payment was required to be paid by Mr Mothew or his insurers. Bristol and West ended up having to make a contribution in the region of eighty thousand pounds (£80,000) to the costs of Mr Mothew's indemnity insurers. This case is important because the Court of Appeal set out authority (a case with establishing a precedent) for a solicitor's "fiduciary duty" to a lender in the application of funds drawn down by the solicitor irrespective of negligence being established. It has never in this particular case established any negligence, default or breach of duty of care by Mr. Mothew.

== Judgment ==
Millett LJ allowed Mothew's appeal, and held that a causal link needed to be established. Just because the solicitor himself had fiduciary duties to his clients, that did not mean that every breach of duty of care was a breach of a fiduciary duty. When considering breaches of trust, causation need not be demonstrated, since these are concerned with acts of bad faith or breaches of the duty of loyalty that result in restitutionary damages. The building society had been fully informed and had consented to Mothew's course of action, which broke the causal link.

Also, a claim for breach of trust was not accepted, because Mothew's misrepresentations did not lead him outside his authority to apply the mortgage money. At p. 16-18 Millett LJ gave a summary of the relevant law.

Despite the warning given by Fletcher Moulton L.J. in In re Coomber; Coomber v. Coomber [1911] 1 Ch. 723, 728, this branch of the law has been bedevilled by unthinking resort to verbal formulae. It is therefore necessary to begin by defining one's terms. The expression "fiduciary duty" is properly confined to those duties which are peculiar to fiduciaries and the breach of which attracts legal consequences differing from those consequent upon the breach of other duties. Unless the expression is so limited it is lacking in practical utility. In this sense it is obvious that not every breach of duty by a fiduciary is a breach of fiduciary duty. I would endorse the observations of Southin J. in Girardet v. Crease & Co. (1987) 11 B.C.L.R. (2d) 361, 362:

"The word 'fiduciary' is flung around now as if it applied to all breaches of duty by solicitors, directors of companies and so forth. . . . That a lawyer can commit a breach of the special duty [of a fiduciary] . . . by entering into a contract with the client without full disclosure . . . and so forth is clear. But to say that simple carelessness in giving advice is such a breach is a perversion of words."

These remarks were approved by La Forest J. in Lac Minerals Ltd. v. International Corona Resources Ltd. (1989) 61 D.L.R. (4th) 14, 28 where he said: "not every legal claim arising out of a relationship with fiduciary incidents will give rise to a claim for breach of fiduciary duty."

It is similarly inappropriate to apply the expression to the obligation of a trustee or other fiduciary to use proper skill and care in the discharge of his duties. If it is confined to cases where the fiduciary nature of the duty has special legal consequences, then the fact that the source of the duty is to be found in equity rather than the common law does not make it a fiduciary duty. The common law and equity each developed the duty of care, but they did so independently of each other and the standard of care required is not always the same. But they influenced each other, and today the substance of the resulting obligations is more significant than their particular historic origin. In Henderson v Merrett Syndicates Ltd [1995] 2 A.C. 145, 205 Lord Browne-Wilkinson said:

"The liability of a fiduciary for the negligent transaction of his duties is not a separate head of liability but the paradigm of the general duty to act with care imposed by law on those who take it upon themselves to act for or advise others. Although the historical development of the rules of law and equity have, in the past, caused different labels to be stuck on different manifestations of the duty, in truth the duty of care imposed on bailees, carriers, trustees, directors, agents and others is the same duty: it arises from the circumstances in which the defendants were acting, not from their status or description. It is the fact that they have all assumed responsibility for the property or affairs of others which renders them liable for the careless performance of what they have undertaken to do, not the description of the trade or position which they hold."

I respectfully agree, and endorse the comment of Ipp J. in Permanent Building Society v. Wheeler (1994) 14 A.C.S.R. 109, 157:

"It is essential to bear in mind that the existence of a fiduciary relationship does not mean that every duty owed by a fiduciary to the beneficiary is a fiduciary duty. In particular, a trustee's duty to exercise reasonable care, though equitable, is not specifically a fiduciary duty . . ."

Ipp J. explained, at p. 158:

"The director's duty to exercise care and skill has nothing to do with any position of disadvantage or vulnerability on the part of the company. It is not a duty that stems from the requirements of trust and confidence imposed on a fiduciary. In my opinion, that duty is not a fiduciary duty, although it is a duty actionable in the equitable jurisdiction of this court. . . . I consider that Hamilton owed P.B.S. a duty, both in law and in equity, to exercise reasonable care and skill, and P.B.S. was able to mount a claim against him for breach of the legal duty, and, in the alternative, breach of the equitable duty. For the reasons I have expressed, in my view the equitable duty is not to be equated with or termed a 'fiduciary' duty."

I agree. Historical support for this analysis may be found in Viscount Haldane L.C.'s speech in Nocton v Lord Ashburton [1914] A.C. 932, 956. Discussing the old bill in Chancery for equitable compensation for breach of fiduciary duty, he said that he thought it probable that a demurrer for want of equity would always have lain to a bill which did no more than seek to enforce a claim for damages for negligence against a solicitor.

In my judgment this is not just a question of semantics. It goes to the very heart of the concept of breach of fiduciary duty and the availability of equitable remedies.

Although the remedy which equity makes available for breach of the equitable duty of skill and care is equitable compensation rather than damages, this is merely the product of history and in this context is in my opinion a distinction without a difference. Equitable compensation for breach of the duty of skill and care resembles common law damages in that it is awarded by way of compensation to the plaintiff for his loss. There is no reason in principle why the common law rules of causation, remoteness of damage and measure of damages should not be applied by analogy in such a case. It should not be confused with equitable compensation for breach of fiduciary duty, which may be awarded in lieu of rescission or specific restitution. This leaves those duties which are special to fiduciaries and which attract those remedies which are peculiar to the equitable jurisdiction and are primarily restitutionary or restorative rather than compensatory. A fiduciary is someone who has undertaken to act for or on behalf of another in a particular matter in circumstances which give rise to a relationship of trust and confidence. The distinguishing obligation of a fiduciary is the obligation of loyalty. The principal is entitled to the single-minded loyalty of his fiduciary. This core liability has several facets. A fiduciary must act in good faith; he must not make a profit out of his trust; he must not place himself in a position where his duty and his interest may conflict; he may not act for his own benefit or the benefit of a third person without the informed consent of his principal. This is not intended to be an exhaustive list, but it is sufficient to indicate the nature of fiduciary obligations. They are the defining characteristics of the fiduciary. As Dr. Finn pointed out in his classic work Fiduciary Obligations (1977), p. 2, he is not subject to fiduciary obligations because he is a fiduciary; it is because he is subject to them that he is a fiduciary.

Staughton LJ and Otton LJ agreed.

== See also ==
- English tort law
- Trust law
- Henderson v Merrett Syndicates Ltd [1994] 2 AC 145, 205, per Lord Browne-Wilkinson
