= Philip Otton =

British judge (1933–2026)

The Right Honourable Sir Philip Otton

Lord Justice of Appeal
- In office 1995–2001

Justice of the High Court
- In office 1983–1995

Personal details
- Born: 28 May 1933 England
- Died: 20 October 2026 (aged 93)

Sir Philip Howard Otton (28 May 1933 – 20 October 2026) was a British judge who served as Lord Justice of Appeal from 1995 to 2001.

== Early life and career ==
Otton was born on 28 May 1933. His birthplace is reported variously as Coventry or Kenilworth, Warwickshire; he attended Bablake School in Coventry, which he called his hometown. He was educated at the University of Birmingham (LLB). In 1983, he was approved as a High Court judge and assigned to the Queen's Bench Division. He was subsequently appointed Lord Justice of Appeal in 1995. He retired at age 67, before the mandatory retirement age, in order to take other legal appointments, including a term from 2001 to 2010 as a surveillance commissioner providing independent oversight of covert law enforcement operations. In 2004, he was appointed to the Court of Appeal in Gibraltar. He was judge of the Qatar Civil and Commercial Court from 2007 to 2011. He became prominent in sports law, serving on bodies adjudicating disputes and allegations involving the Premier League, Formula 1, the America's Cup, and the International Cycling Union. He worked as an arbitrator at the firm Twenty Essex until his retirement from all legal work in 2016.

=== Judgments ===
- Mothew v Bristol & West Building Society [1998] EWCA Civ 533, [1998] Ch 1 - leading English fiduciary law and professional negligence case, concerning a solicitor's duty of care and skill, and the nature of fiduciary duties; Otton concurring with Millett LJ.
- R v Inspectorate of Pollution, ex p. Greenpeace (No.2) [1994] 4 All ER 329 - leading case on standing of interest groups to bring applications for judicial review and the meaning of "sufficient interest" under section 31(3) of the Senior Courts Act 1981.

== Death ==
Otton died on 20 October 2026, aged 93.

== Awards and honours ==
Otton was awarded the Coventry Award of Merit in 2002. He held honorary degrees from Nottingham Trent University, the University of Essex and the University of Birmingham.
