= Armitage v Nurse =

English trusts law case on exemption clauses

- Court: Court of Appeal of England and Wales
- Full case name: Armitage v. Nurse and others
- Decided: March 19, 1997
- Citations: [1997] EWCA Civ 1279, [1998] Ch 241, [1997] 3 WLR 1046, [1997] 2 All ER 705

Court membership
- Judges sitting: Hirst LJ, Millett LJ and Hutchison LJ

Armitage v Nurse [1997] EWCA Civ 1279 is the leading decision in English trusts law concerning the validity of exemption clauses. The Court of Appeal held that in English law trustee exemption clauses can validly exempt trustees from liability for all breaches of trust except fraud. Millett LJ gave the leading judgment.

== Facts ==
Millett LJ summarises the facts at p. 248 of the report.

The settlement was made on 11 October 1984. It was the result of an application to the court by the trustees of a marriage settlement made by Paula [Armitage]'s grandfather for the variation of the trusts of the settlement under the Variation of Trusts Act 1958. Paula's mother was life tenant under the marriage settlement and Paula, who was then aged 17, was entitled in remainder. The settled property consisted largely of land which was farmed by a family company called G. W. Nurse & Co. Ltd. The company had farmed the land for many years and, until March 1984, it had held a tenancy of the land. Paula's mother and grandmother were the sole directors and shareholders of the company.

Under the terms of the variation the property subject to the trusts of the marriage settlement was partitioned between Paula and her mother. Part of the land together with a sum of £230,000 was transferred to Paula's mother absolutely free and discharged from the trusts of the marriage settlement. The remainder of the land ("Paula's land") together with a sum of £30,000 was allocated to Paula. Since she was under age, her share was directed to be held on the trusts of a settlement prepared for her benefit. So the settlement came into being.

Under the trusts of the settlement the trustees held the income upon trust to accumulate it until Paula attained 25 with power to pay it to her or to apply it for her benefit. Thereafter, and until Paula attained 40, they held the income upon trust to pay it to her. The capital was held in trust for Paula at 40 with trusts over in the event of her death under that age, and with provision for transferring the capital to Paula in instalments after she had attained 25 but not 40.

The settlement, which must be taken to have been made by Paula as well as by her mother, appears to have been drawn by counsel for the marriage settlement trustees (Mr. P. W. E. Taylor Q.C. and Mr. Geoffrey Jaques) and approved on Paula's behalf by junior counsel who appeared for her guardian ad litem. It was approved on her behalf by the High Court (Judge Fitz-Hugh Q.C. sitting as a judge of the Chancery Division).

== Judgment ==
In the hearing of the Court of Appeal, Bernard Weatherill QC for Armitage submitted that the "irreducible core" duties of a trustee include the following.

(1) a duty to inquire into the extent and nature the property and the trusts (see Hallows v Lloyd (1888) 39 Ch D 686, 691; Nestlé v National Westminster Bank Plc [1993] 1 WLR 1260, 1265e, 1266h, 1275e-g and Wyman v Paterson [1900] AC 271);
(2) a duty to obey directions in the settlement unless the deviation is sanctioned by the court (see Harrison v Randall (1851) 9 Hare 397, 407 and Royal Brunei Airlines Sdn Bhd v Tan [1995] 2 AC 378, 390a-b);
(3) a duty to account for his stewardship of the assets under his control;
(4) a duty to carry on the business of the trust with the degree of prudence to be expected of a hypothetically reasonably prudent man of business (see Speight v Gaunt (1883) 9 App Cas 1, 19 and In re Whiteley, Whiteley v Learoyd (1886) 33 ChD 347, 355).

Gregory Hill made submissions for Nurse.

=== Court of Appeal ===
Millett LJ held that only a clause which purported to exclude liability for fraud would be considered repugnant and contrary to public policy. Thus the exclusion clause in favour of the trustee was allowed.

I accept the submission made on behalf of Paula that there is an irreducible core of obligations owed by the trustees to the beneficiaries and enforceable by them which is fundamental to the concept of a trust. If the beneficiaries have no rights enforceable against the trustees there are no trusts. But I do not accept the further submission that these core obligations include the duties of skill and care, prudence and diligence. The duty of the trustees to perform the trusts honestly and in good faith for the benefit of the beneficiaries is the minimum necessary to give substance to the trusts, but in my opinion it is sufficient. As Mr. Hill pertinently pointed out in his able argument, a trustee who relied on the presence of a trustee exemption clause to justify what he proposed to do would thereby lose its protection: he would be acting recklessly in the proper sense of the term.

It is, of course, far too late to suggest that the exclusion in a contract of liability for ordinary negligence or want of care is contrary to public policy. What is true of a contract must be equally true of a settlement. It would be very surprising if our law drew the line between liability for ordinary negligence and liability for gross negligence. In this respect English law differs from civil law systems, for it has always drawn a sharp distinction between negligence, however gross, on the one hand and fraud, bad faith and wilful misconduct on the other. The doctrine of the common law is that: "Gross negligence may be evidence of mala fides, but is not the same thing:" see Goodman v. Harvey (1836) 4 A. & E. 870, 876, per Lord Denman C.J. But while we regard the difference between fraud on the one hand and mere negligence, however gross, on the other as a difference in kind, we regard the difference between negligence and gross negligence as merely one of degree. English lawyers have always had a healthy disrespect for the latter distinction. In Hinton v. Dibbin (1842) 2 Q.B. 646 Lord Denman C.J. doubted whether any intelligible distinction exists; while in Grill v. General Iron Screw Collier Co. (1866) L.R. 1 C.P. 600, 612 Willes J. famously observed that gross negligence is ordinary negligence with a vituperative epithet. But civilian systems draw the line in a different place. The doctrine is culpa lata dolo aequiparatur; and although the maxim itself is not Roman the principle is classical. There is no room for the maxim in the common law; it is not mentioned in Broom's Legal Maxims, 10th ed. (1939).

The submission that it is contrary to public policy to exclude the liability of a trustee for gross negligence is not supported by any English or Scottish authority. The cases relied on are the English cases of Wilkins v. Hogg, 31 L.J.Ch. 41 and Pass v. Dundas (1880) 43 L.T. 665; and the Scottish cases of Knox v. Mackinnon (1888) 13 App.Cas. 753, Rae v. Meek (1889) 14 App.Cas. 558, Wyman v. Paterson [1900] A.C. 271 and Clarke v. Clarke's Trustees, 1925 S.C. 693. These cases, together with two other Scottish cases, Seton v. Dawson(1841) 4 D. 310 and Carruthers v. Carruthers [1896] A.C. 659, and cases from the Commonwealth and America, were reviewed by the Jersey Court of Appeal in Midland Bank Trustee (Jersey) Ltd. v. Federated Pension Services Ltd. [1996] P.L.R. 179 in a masterly judgment delivered by Sir Godfray Le Quesne Q.C.

In Wilkins v. Hogg, 31 L.J.Ch. 41 Lord Westbury L.C. accepted that no exemption clause could absolve a trustee from liability for knowingly participating in a fraudulent breach of trust by his co-trustee. But, subject thereto, he was clearly of opinion that a settlor could, by appropriate words, limit the scope of the trustee's liability in any way he chose. The decision was followed in Pass v. Dundas, 43 L.T. 665, where the relevant clause was held to absolve the trustee from liability. In the course of his judgment Sir James Bacon V.-C. stated the law in the terms in which counsel for the unsuccessful beneficiaries had stated it, viz. that the clause protected the trustee from liability unless gross negligence was established; but this was plainly obiter.

This case was cited by the NSW Supreme Court case of Maleski v Hampson.

== See also ==
- Trusts law
