= Christopher Staughton =

English barrister & judge (1933–2014)

The Right Honourable Sir Christopher Staughton

Lord Justice of Appeal
- In office 1987–1997

Justice of the High Court
- In office 1981–1987

Personal details
- Born: Christopher Stephen Thomas Jonathan Thayer Staughton

Sir Christopher Stephen Thomas Jonathan Thayer Staughton, PC (24 May 1933 – 15 October 2014) was an English barrister and judge, who sat as a justice of the High Court of Justice, Court of Appeal of England and Wales and President of the Court of Appeal of Gibraltar.

== Biography ==
Staughton was the son of an Australian father (making Staughton a great-great-grandson of Simon Staughton) and of a Canadian mother, who separated when he was a child, as a result of which he was made a ward of court.

He was educated at Eton College and Magdalene College, Cambridge, where he graduated with first-class honours in law in 1956. Staughton specialised in commercial law, most notably appearing in Hong Kong Fir Shipping Co Ltd v Kawasaki Kisen Kaisha Ltd.

He served as a Recorder in the Crown Court between being appointed to the High Court of Justice in 1981. In 1987 he was appointed to the Court of Appeal of England and Wales, where he sat until 1997. From 2005 to 2006, he served as President of the Court of Appeal of Gibraltar.

Staughton died at Sarratt, Hertfordshire on 15 October 2014, aged 81.

== Judgments ==
- Nestle v National Westminster Bank plc [1992] EWCA Civ 12, [1993] 1 WLR 1260 - English trusts law case concerning the duty of care when a trustee is making an investment.
- Boyo v London Borough of Lambeth [1994] ICR 727 - UK labour law case, concerning wrongful dismissal.
- Wheeler v JJ Saunders Ltd [1994] EWCA Civ 32 - case on nuisance which amended the precedent set by Gillingham Borough Council v Medway (Chatham) Dock Co Ltd.
- Macmillan Inc v Bishopsgate Investment Trust plc (No 3) [1996] WLR 387 - situs and priority of claims to foreign shares.
- Mothew v Bristol & West Building Society [1998] EWCA Civ 533, [1998] Ch 1 - leading English fiduciary law and professional negligence case, concerning a solicitor's duty of care and skill, and the nature of fiduciary duties; Staughton concurring with Millett LJ
- Petraco (Bermuda) Ltd v Petromed International - explains what guidelines should be applied by a High Court judge when deciding whether or not to grant an appeal after arbitration under the Arbitration Act 1979.
