= Re Charnley Davies Ltd (No 2) =

UK law case

- Court: High Court
- Citation: [1990] BCLC 760

Case opinions
- Millett J

Keywords
- Administration

Re Charnley Davies Ltd (No 2) [1990] BCLC 760 is a UK insolvency law case concerning the administration procedure when a company is unable to repay its debts. It held that an administrator would only breach a duty of care (here in selling off property, arguably for too little) if an ordinary, skilled practitioner would have acted differently.

== Facts ==
Charnley Davies Ltd was one of 17 insurance broking companies which collapsed in 1987 and operated out of Leeds, Wakefield and Hull. Creditors of Charnley Davies alleged that the administrator, Mr AJ Richmond, acted with undue haste in selling the business. He sold the business for a total of £50,000, plus £7500 for furniture and equipment, allegedly a grossly undervalued price. The creditors argued that they should have been consulted, because they were in the insurance business. The creditors argued the administrators were in breach of Insolvency Act 1986, section 27 because they had been unfairly prejudiced by the administrator's actions (see now Insolvency Act 1986, Schedule B1, para 74, which uses the phrase ‘unfairly harm’).

== Judgment ==
Millett J held that the administrator had not unfairly prejudiced the creditors, and rejected that the standard of care had been breached. This was, in substance, an action for professional negligence. The administrator owed a duty to a company to obtain a proper price for assets, the same as for anybody with a power to sell property that does not belong to him (such as a mortgagee, as in Cuckmere Brick Co Ltd v Mutual Finance Ltd [1971] Ch 949). He ‘must take reasonable care in choosing the time at which to sell the property. His duty is ‘to take reasonable care to obtain the best price that the circumstances permit, as in Standard Chartered Bank Ltd v Walker [1982] 1 WLR 1410. But that only meant ‘the best prices that circumstances as he reasonably perceives them to be permit. He is not made liable because his perception is wrong, unless it is unreasonable.’ Professional negligence principles did apply to professional insolvency practitioners, which administrators must be. This was to be judged by the standard of ‘an ordinary, skilled practitioner. In order to succeed the claimant must establish that the administrator has made an error which a reasonably skilled and careful insolvency practitioner would not have made.’ Millett J also said the following.

An administrator must be a professional insolvency practitioner. A complaint that he has failed to take reasonable care in the sale of the company's assets is, therefore, a complaint of professional negligence and in my judgment the established principles applicable to cases of professional negligence are equally applicable in such a case. It follows that the administrator is to be judged, not by the standards of the most meticulous and conscientious member of his profession, but by those of an ordinary, skilled practitioner. In order to succeed the claimant must establish that the administrator has made an error which a reasonably skilled and careful insolvency practitioner would not have made. None of this was in dispute before me.

[...]

Mr Richmond was called upon to dispose of the business in highly unfavourable circumstances. He had to conclude a deal before the business fell apart; he was involved in a triangular negotiation with the brokers and the purchasers; and any other interested party would have to elicit information about the business from the very persons who were competing with Mr Richmond to sell the goodwill. He had a very weak hand. He might well have achieved nothing. In fact he obtained a fair value for the business. I am satisfied that the price he achieved was the best price that could reasonably be obtained in the circumstances.

== See also ==
- UK insolvency law
