= Trade Union Defender =

The trade union defender (formerly called: worker defender) in French law, is a person who exercises functions of assistance or representation of employees before the industrial tribunals and the Courts of Appeal in labor matters.

This person is appointed by a trade union or professional organization. This function was created by a legislator in 1958.

== Field of practice ==
Article 258 of the law of August 6, 2015, known as the Macron law (named after Emmanuel Macron), redefines the field of practice of the trade union defender and frames his prerogatives.

He is registered on a list drawn up by the administrative authority at regional level, on the proposal of representative organizations of employers and employees at national and inter-professional, national and multi-professional level or in at least one branch under conditions defined by decree.

In establishments with at least eleven employees, the union defender has the time necessary to carry out his duties within the limit of ten hours per month. The time spent by the union defender outside the company during working hours for the exercise of his mission is assimilated to effective working time for the determination of the duration of paid leave and the right to social insurance benefits and family benefits as well as with regard to all the rights that the employee has due to his seniority in the company. These absences are remunerated by the employer and do not entail any reduction in remuneration and corresponding benefits.

Employers are reimbursed by the state for wages maintained during the absences of the union defender for the exercise of his mission as well as the corresponding benefits and social security contributions.
