= Irish Life and Permanent plc v Dunne =

Irish Supreme Court case

- Coat of arms of Ireland
- Court: Supreme Court of Ireland
- Full case name: Irish Life and Permanent plc (Plaintiff / Respondents) v Gemma Dunne and Kevin Dunne (Defendants / Appellants); Irish Life and Permanent plc (Plaintiff / Respondents) v Dylan Dunphy (Defendant / Appellant)
- Decided: 15 May 2015
- Citations: [2015] IESC 46; [2016] 1 IR 92

Case history
- Appealed from: Irish Life and Permanent Plc v Dunne (case no. 259 of 2013, High Court); Irish Life and Permanent Plc v Dunphy [2013] IEHC 235

Court membership
- Judges sitting: Denham CJ, O’Donnell J, Clarke J, Laffoy J and Charleton J

Case opinions
- A court hearing an application for an order for possession by a lender should be satisfied that the lender complied with the moratorium on seeking possession in certain circumstances imposed by the Code of Conduct on Mortgage Arrears. Where such an application for possession has been brought in circumstances in clear breach of a moratorium, the court should decline to make the order. However, failure by a lender to comply with other provisions of the Code of Conduct on Mortgage Arrears will not, as a matter of law, affect the relevant lender’s entitlement to obtain an order for possession.
- Decision by: Clarke J
- Concurrence: Denham CJ, O’Donnell J, Laffoy J and Charleton J

Keywords
- Mortgages; Possession; Code of Conduct on Mortgage Arrears; Banking and Finance

Irish Life and Permanent plc v Dunne, [2015] IESC 46, [2016] 1 IR 92, was an Irish Supreme Court case in which the Supreme Court clarified the impact of a lender failing to comply with the Code of Conduct on Mortgage Arrears 2010 (the “Code”) on that lender's right to obtain an order of possession of mortgaged property.

== Background ==
Irish Life and Permanent plc initiated two separate sets of proceedings against each of the appellants (Dunne and Dunphy) in the Circuit Court seeking orders of possession of mortgaged properties. The Circuit Court cases were decided without the Circuit Court hearing oral evidence and both decisions were appealed to the High Court. In separate High Court proceedings, Hogan J stated both cases for the opinion of the Supreme Court pursuant to s38(3) of the Courts of Justice Act 1936. Section 38 of the Courts of Justice Act 1936 provides that an appeal lies to the High Court from every judgment or order of the Circuit Court in a civil matter, other than “judgments and orders in respect of which other provision in relation to appeals is made” by the Courts of Justice Act 1936. S38(3) of the Courts of Justice Act 1936 goes on to provide that a judge “hearing an appeal under this section” may refer any question of law arising during a hearing to the Supreme Court by way of case stated. In both cases, Hogan J queried whether the High Court had jurisdiction to state a case for consideration of the Supreme Court pursuant to s38(3) of the Courts of Justice Act 1936 in the course of an appeal from the Circuit Court where no oral evidence was given before the court.

In the Dunne case, Hogan J also queried whether the non-compliance by a lender with the Code would affect, as a matter of law, the lender's entitlement to obtain an order for possession and, if so, whether the court must refuse to make such an order in the event of any breach of the Code. The Code requires lenders to follow a process with borrowers in (or in danger of falling into) arrears in order to try to address the mortgage arrears problems. As part of this process, the Code imposes a moratorium (that is, a temporary suspension) preventing lenders from bringing repossession proceedings until a certain period of time has elapsed.

In the Dunphy case, Hogan J also queried whether the respondents had a vested right to possession in the property pursuant to s62(7) of the Registration of Title Act 1964 (and whether this right vested prior to 1 December 2009 when s62(7) of the Registration of Title Act 1964 was repealed) and in any event, whether the Supreme Court could grant possession to a mortgagee pursuant to a contractual agreement independent of statute.

== Holding of the Supreme Court ==
=== Jurisdiction to state a case to the Supreme Court ===
Clarke J delivered the only written judgment for the Supreme Court (with which the other judges agreed). The Supreme Court held that notwithstanding the fact that a literal interpretation of s38(3) of the Courts of Justice Act 1936 suggested otherwise, it was proper to interpret the Courts of Justice Act 1936 as conferring a jurisdiction on a High Court judge to state a case to the Supreme Court in an appeal where no oral evidence was heard in the Circuit Court. Relying on s5 of the Interpretation Act 2005, Clarke J concluded that the Supreme Court could interpret legislation in a manner that is different from that which would derive from its literal construction where there could be no conceivable basis on which the Oireachtas (the Irish parliament) might have chosen to legislate in the manner that the literal construction would require and where the intention of the Oireachtas was clear from the relevant legislation taken as a whole.

=== Failing to comply with the Code of Conduct on Mortgage Arrears ===
The Supreme Court also concluded that a court hearing an application for possession of mortgaged property by a lender should be satisfied that there was compliance by the lender with the moratorium on the commencement of repossession proceedings set out in the Code. The court must decline to make an order where there has been a failure to comply with this moratorium. However, a failure by a lender to comply with other provisions of the Code would not, as a matter of law, affect that lender's entitlement to obtain an order for possession. While the Supreme Court concluded that it was a matter for the lender to establish compliance with the moratorium period imposed by the Code, Clarke J did note that an affirmation in an affidavit to the effect that the repossession proceedings were commenced outside of the moratorium period ought to be sufficient to establish compliance with the Code unless proven otherwise.

=== Possession pursuant to the Registration of Title Act 1964 ===
Finally, the Supreme Court noted that where a court is asked to make an order for possession pursuant to s62(7) of the Registration of Title Act 1964, it must ask whether, as a matter of law, it can properly be said that the principal monies secured by the charge on registered land had become due. To determine whether these monies had become due, the court must first refer to the terms of the contract between the lender and the borrower that address when the entire principal sum falls due. Where the principal monies owning has fallen due, a conditional agreement by a lender not to proceed to exercise the lender's entitlement to seek possession would have no effect on the pre-existing entitlement of the lender to the entire principal sum due in circumstances where the conditions specified in the agreement had clearly not been met. The Supreme Court concluded that with respect to the questions posed by Hogan J in the Dunphy case, the entire principal sum was due on 1 December 2009 and was vested as of that date.
