= Arbitration Act 1979 =

Act of the Parliament of the United Kingdom

Arbitration Act 1979 (Note: Section 8(1).)
- Act of Parliament
- Parliament of the United Kingdom
- Long title: An Act to amend the law relating to arbitrations and for purposes connected therewith
- Citation: 1979 c. 42
- Territorial extent: England and Wales (Note: Section 8(4).)

Dates
- Royal assent: 4 April 1979
- Commencement: 1 August 1979 (Note: Section 8(2). The Arbitration Act 1979 (Commencement) Order 1979 (SI 1979/750).)
- Repealed: 31 January 1997
Other legislation
Amends	Arbitration Act 1950; Administration of Justice Act 1970
Repealed by	Arbitration Act 1996

Status: Repealed

Text of statute as originally enacted

The Arbitration Act 1979 (c. 42) was an act of the Parliament of the United Kingdom that reformed arbitration law in England and Wales. Prior to 1979, arbitration law was based on the Arbitration Act 1950 (14 Geo. 6. c. 27), which allowed use of the "case stated" procedure and other methods of judicial intervention, which marked English arbitration law as significantly different from that of other jurisdictions. The prior law significantly increased the cost and time required for arbitration, which made England an unpopular jurisdiction to conduct such negotiations in. As a result, while London maintained its traditional position as a centre for arbitration in insurance, admiralty and commodities trading, it failed to attract more modern forms of trade. Following pressure from industry groups, the Lord Chancellor introduced the Arbitration Bill into Parliament, having it passed hours before the dissolution of James Callaghan's government. It was given royal assent on 4 April 1979, and commenced working on 1 August 1979.

The act completely abolished the "case stated" procedure and other forms of judicial interference, replacing it with a limited system of appeal to the High Court of Justice and Court of Appeal of England and Wales; it also allowed for exclusion agreements limiting the rights of parties to arbitration to appeal to the courts, and gave arbitrators the ability to enforce interlocutory orders. Academics met the act with a mixed response; while some praised it for bringing English law more into line with that of other nations, others criticised the wording used as unnecessarily complex and hazy. The act did, in the eyes of some commentators, lead to a shift in judicial policy away from legal certainty and towards a system focused on speed and finality. Having been repealed in its entirety by Section 107(2) of the Arbitration Act 1996, the act is no longer in force.

== Background ==
=== Previous law ===
London was historically a centre for trade and arbitration, which Peter S. Smedresman, writing in the Journal of Maritime Law and Commerce divides into three categories of transaction. English commodities trading, through bodies such as the Baltic Exchange, specify that any conflicts are to be settled through arbitration in London, even when the goods being traded have no relation to the United Kingdom. London has also been a centre for arbitration on maritime issues, and insurance. However, it failed to significantly attract more modern forms of trade, such as major communications developments or high-technology projects, due to the nature of its arbitration law. These contracts normally involve large amounts of money and are administered by the International Chamber of Commerce, which rarely sent arbitration cases to London due to the individual nature of English law on the subject.

In most nations, arbitrators can apply the principle of "amiable composition"; the case is decided under broad, sweeping principles of equity, without judicial oversight or the application of national commercial law. In England, this was not the case; the Arbitration Act 1950 (14 Geo. 6. c. 27), in Section 22(1), allowed the courts to instruct an arbitrator to "correct" his decision, if it had an incorrect statement of law immediately obvious. In response to this, English arbitrators simply stopped giving reasons for their decisions. The second form of judicial oversight was found in Section 21, and was an application of the "Case Stated" procedure. This allowed judicial review of a decision by the High Court of Justice, and was regularly applied during the 1970s, because the freeze on interest rates during a delayed case made it attractive for debtors to delay; conversely, this made London a far less attractive venue for creditors.

Before the 1979 act, English law did not provide many ways to avoid the case stated procedure, even prohibiting parties from agreeing in advance not to use it; this was due to Scrutton LJ's statement, in Czarnikow v Roth, Schmidt & Co, that "There must be no Alsatia in England where the King's writ does not run". In The Lysland, the Court of Appeal of England and Wales gave a decision interpreted as saying that the courts must consider a case stated "even if there is no great some in dispute, no point of general importance is involved or the answer is reasonably clear". Lord Denning's statement in that case has been described as "[T]he death knell of arbitrator autonomy", and led to arbitrators almost automatically asking for judicial supervision for fear that they would otherwise be found to have committed misconduct. For obvious reasons, companies and parties to a case who submit their issues to arbitration expect something private, quick, and cheap, with fixed results. The traditional English emphasis on judicial oversight, therefore, meant that with the Case Stated procedure, London was a highly unpopular venue for arbitration.

=== Development of the act ===
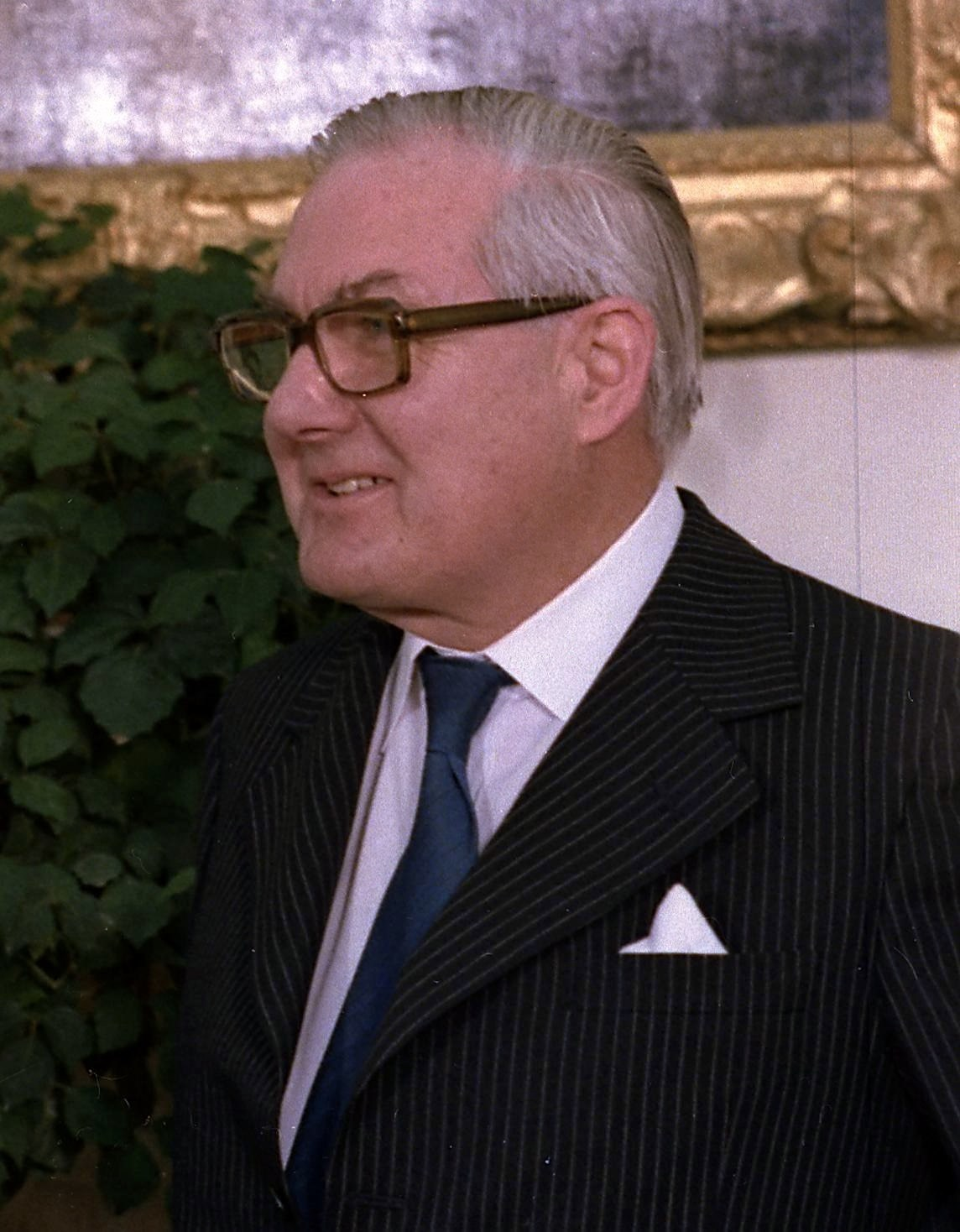
James Callaghan; a motion of no confidence in his government forced the passage of the act through the House of Commons in a few hours.

By the 1960s, even before the increase of abuse of the case stated procedure, the United Kingdom was estimated to be losing £500 million a year through the movement of arbitration business to other countries. In response, the Lord Chancellor convened a Commercial Court Users Conference in 1960, and tasked them with reviewing the system; the conclusion was that the status quo should remain. With the increased use of the Case Stated procedure, more calls for reform came. In June 1977 the London Arbitration Group (LAG) was formed, taking it upon itself to make the government aware of the damage current law was causing. In 1978, in reaction to the continued pressure, the Lord Chancellor established a Commercial Court Committee to again look at the issue; their report, in June 1978, recommended changing the system so that appeal was only allowed when either the High Court permitted it, or both parties to the arbitration agreed it was necessary. This was intended to ensure that any new act of Parliament fulfilled two roles – firstly, decreasing the use of the case stated procedure, and secondly, encouraging arbitrators to give reasons for their decisions.

The report was endorsed by the government, and published the following month. After being announced in the Queen's Speech, the Arbitration Bill was introduced to the House of Lords by the Lord Chancellor in late 1978, given its second reading on 12 December 1978, and after passing through the committee stage, its third reading on 15 February 1979. Before it could be sent to the House of Commons, however, James Callaghan's government collapsed following a motion of no confidence. As "the final drama", the Arbitration Bill quickly made it to the House of Commons and was passed during the few hours it took Callaghan to get to Buckingham Palace and ask for a dissolution. Royal assent was granted on 4 April 1979, and the Arbitration Act 1979 came into force on 1 August.

== Provisions ==
The act was "a compromise between two opposing jurisprudential approaches to arbitration...that the courts should be kept out of arbitration altogether except to prevent abuses against the rules of natural justice, [and] that the courts should retain a substantial measure of control over arbitrations to ensure that arbitral awards apply the law".

=== Section 1 ===
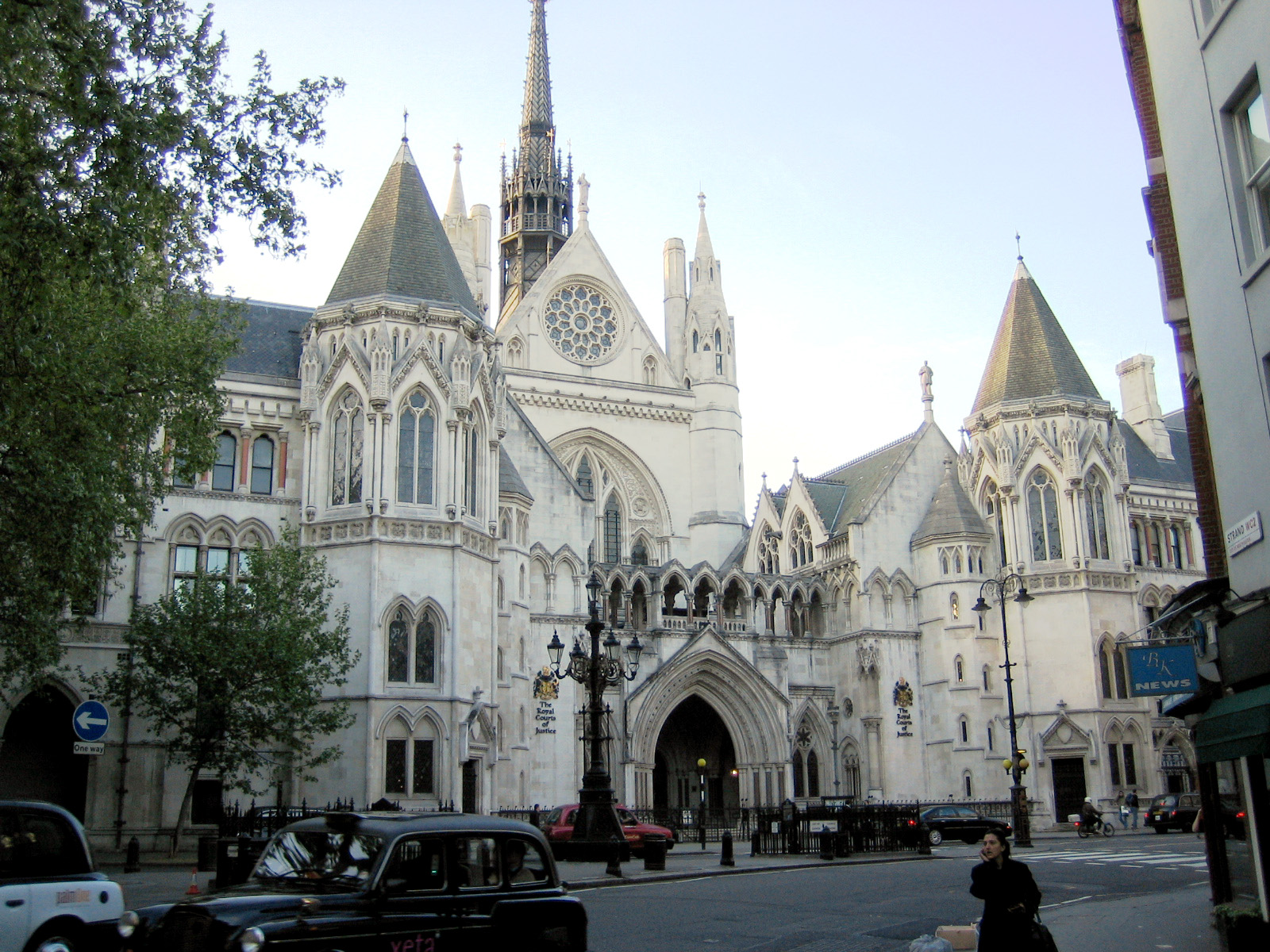
The High Court of Justice, the principal body that deals with arbitration appeals

The primary reforms are found in Section 1 of the act. Section 1(1) repeals section 21 of the 1950 act, abolishing the case stated procedure in arbitration matters, and states that the courts cannot set aside a decision based on an error in law or fact that is blatantly obvious, effectively repealing section 22(1). Instead, sections 1(2) and 1(3) provide that an appeal may be made "on any question of law arising out of an award made on an arbitration agreement", if either the High Court agrees the appeal is valid, or if both parties to the arbitration request it. In Petraco (Bermuda) Ltd v Petromed International, the Court of Appeal was asked to explain what guidelines should be applied by a High Court judge when deciding whether or not to grant an appeal. The High Court had refused leave to appeal, because a point was raised which had not been mentioned during arbitration. Staughton LJ, with the rest of the court in agreement, explained that:

the judge should give such weight as he thinks fit to the failure to argue the point before the arbitrator. In particular, he should have regard to whether the new point is similar to points that were argued, perhaps a variant of one of those points or a different way of putting it on the one hand, or whether it is a totally new and different point on the other.

The conditions for leave to appeal are laid out in section 1(4). No conditions attach to an appeal where all parties consent, but when the permission of the High Court is sought, the judge may only grant leave if he "considers that...the question of law concerned could substantially affect the rights of one or more parties to the arbitration agreement". Under Sections 1(5) and 1(6), the High Court may ask for additional reasons as to why the arbitrator reached the decision that he did, but only if one of the parties gave notice to the arbitrator that reasons would be required, or there was "some special reason why such a notice was not given". In Universal Petroleum Co v Handels und Transport GmbH, the Court of Appeal interpreted the meaning of Sections 1(4) and 1(5). The dispute came from a highly detailed "Schedule of Further Reasons" ordered by the High Court because the judge felt that there was an ambiguous element in the reasons given. The appellate judges found that Section 1(5) required judges to order further reasons only to deal with points of law arising from the award. Material ambiguity was "inadmissible and irrelevant for the purpose of the exercise of any jurisdiction under section 1 of the act".

If the High Court refuses to hear an appeal, the case cannot proceed further; similarly, with one exception, once the High Court has heard a case, no decision may be reviewed by the Court of Appeal. The one exception is laid out in section 1(7), and provides that leave to appeal is only valid if either the High Court or Court of Appeal certifies it as such, and the High Court confirms that the case concerns a point of law which merits consideration. In National Westminster Bank Plc v Arthur Young McClelland Moores & Co (No.1), the Court of Appeal confirmed that, once the High Court has decided not to allow an appeal, the registrar of the Court of Appeal cannot intervene and otherwise validate such a request.

=== Sections 2–6 ===
Section 21 of the 1950 act contained a secondary method of appeal to the High Court. Through the "Consultative Case" procedure, parties in a pending arbitration could ask the High Court to quickly give a decision on a point of law. This provision was maintained in the 1979 act, despite efforts by legislators to remove it. Section 2 provides that, should a party apply to the High Court with either the consent of the arbitrator or the other parties, the High Court may explain any point of law given in the reference, on the condition that the point of law meets the requirements laid out in Section 1, and if "the determination of the application might produce substantial savings in costs to the parties".

Czarnikow v Roth, Schmidt & Co, the decision in which it was decided agreements excluding judicial supervision are invalid, is partially overruled by Sections 3 and 4. Section 3 provides that, where such an agreement is drafted, the High Court no longer has the automatic right to request additional reasons from the arbitrator or grant leave to appeal the decision. Such exclusion clauses must be specific, but can be general in nature; Section 3(2) states that it can be framed "to relate to a particular award, to awards under a particular reference or to any other description of awards, whether arising out of the same reference or not". Section 3(6) provides an exception, which covers "domestic" arbitration agreements; these are defined as agreements where leave to appeal would not be valid in a jurisdiction outside the United Kingdom, and no parties are businesses or individuals legally based in the UK. In this situation, the exclusion clause is only valid if agreed to after the start of arbitration. A second exception is found in Section 4(1); where the contract arbitration is based on is within admiralty jurisdiction, to do with commodities trading, or an insurance agreement, it will not be valid unless either it was entered into after the start of arbitration or the law applicable to the contract is not that of England and Wales. In any situation, the High Court can be asked to give a decision on a point of law, or the exclusion clause removed, should all parties agree.

Prior to the 1979 act, arbitrators were allowed to make interlocutory orders penalising parties who failed to follow the arbitrator's timetable or requests; there was, however, no effective enforcement mechanism. Section 5 of the act allows the High Court to intervene; if a party fails to comply, the High Court may (on the application of the arbitrator or any other party) order the arbitrator to continue as if the offending party was not there; he can immediately issue an award without considering their missing submission or failure to appear. Section 6 amends the 1950 act, which required any two arbitrators hearing a case to immediately appoint an umpire. This caused unnecessary delay and expenditure. Section 6 instead provides that arbitrators can choose to appoint an umpire at any point, but must do "forthwith" if they fundamentally disagree.

== Assessment ==
David Shenton and Gordon Toland concluded that the act brought judicial oversight in English law into compliance with that of other nations, saying that it is "broadly comparable to the provisions...to be found in Swedish, Swiss and French law". Smedresman, however, argued that it would do little to help attract new arbitration and would in fact drive it away, saying that "the vagueness of the statutory language, combined with the rather hazy policy considerations behind the act, make confusion and litigation likely". David Hacking, who helped promote the act, says that it "was not drafted with the elegance of the 1996 Arbitration Act. In the style of the Parliamentary Draftsmen of that time, many of its provisions were drafted with a complexity which was happily avoided in the 1996 Act", and criticises the failure to achieve more than minor reform of existing law. However, he does note that the act led to a shift in judicial policy, with future judgments to be issued with regards "to the need for finality...the striving for legal accuracy may be said to have been overtaken by commercial expediency". Jaffe agrees, writing in the journal Arbitration that "[i]t is clear that with the passage of the 1979 Act...there has been a distinct and noticeable shift of emphasis from legal certainty to finality for arbitral awards".

== Subsequent developments ==
The whole act was repealed by section 107(2) of, and schedule 4 to, the Arbitration Act 1996, which came into force on 31 January 1997. The 1996 act does not apply to arbitral proceedings commenced before that date, so the 1979 act continued to govern them.

== Bibliography ==
- Abromson, Ellen Jane (1980). "The English Arbitration Act of 1979: A Symbiotic Relationship Between the Courts and Arbitration Tribunals". Suffolk Transnational Law Journal. 5 (1). Suffolk University Law School. ISSN 1072-8546.
- Hacking, David (2010). "The story of the Arbitration Act 1979". Arbitration. 76 (1). Chartered Institute of Arbitrators. ISSN 0003-7877.
- Jaffe, Paul A.C. (1989). "Judicial supervision of commercial arbitration in England". Arbitration. 55 (3). Chartered Institute of Arbitrators. ISSN 0003-7877.
- Kerr, Michael (1980). "The Arbitration Act 1979". Modern Law Review. 43 (1). Blackwell Publishing. ISSN 0026-7961.
- Kolodziej, A.J. (1987). "Arbitration Act 1979: genesis and operation". Company Lawyer. 8 (5). Sweet & Maxwell. ISSN 0144-1027.
- Marshall, Enid A. (1986). "Construction of Arbitration Act 1979 s.1(7)". Journal of Business Law. ISSN 0021-9460.
- Marshall, Enid A. (1988). "Scope of jurisdiction to order further reasons under section 1(5) of the Arbitration Act 1979". Journal of Business Law. Sweet & Maxwell. ISSN 0021-9460.
- Marshall, Enid A. (1989). "Additional guideline on discretion to grant leave to appeal under Arbitration Act 1979, s.1(3)(b)". Journal of Business Law. Sweet & Maxwell. ISSN 0021-9460.
- Shenton, David W.; Gordon K. Toland (1980). "London as a Venue for International Arbitration: the Arbitration Act 1979". Law & Policy in International Business. 12 (1). ISSN 0023-9208.
- Smedresman, Peter S. (1979). "The Arbitration Act 1979". Journal of Maritime Law and Commerce. 11 (1). Jefferson Law Book Company. ISSN 0022-2410.
