= Negligence (disambiguation) =

Negligence is a concept in the law of tort.

Negligence may also refer to:

- Negligence (band), a Slovenian thrash metal band

== In law ==
=== Tort law ===
- Negligence in employment

==== In common law ====
- Contributory negligence
- Professional negligence in English Law

=== Criminal law ===
- Gross negligence
- Criminal negligence

=== Other ===
- Calculus of negligence
- Comparative negligence
- Excusable negligence
- Negligence per se, a legal doctrine whereby an act is considered negligent because it violates a statute or regulation

== See also ==
- Neglect in the context of caregiving
