= Arbitration Act 1950 =

Act of the Parliament of the United Kingdom

Arbitration Act 1950 (Note: Section 44(1).)
- Act of Parliament
- Parliament of the United Kingdom
- Long title: An Act to consolidate the Arbitration Acts, 1889 to 1934.
- Citation: 14 Geo. 6. c. 27
- Territorial extent: United Kingdom

Dates
- Royal assent: 28 July 1950
- Commencement: 1 September 1950 (Note: Section 44(2).)
- Repealed: Scotland:
Other legislation
Amends	Light Railways Act 1896; See § Repealed enactments
Repeals/revokes	See § Repealed enactments
Amended by	Law Reform (Miscellaneous Provisions) (Scotland) Act 1966; Administration of Justice Act 1977; Judicature (Northern Ireland) Act 1978; Statute Law (Repeals) Act 1978; Arbitration Act 1979; Senior Courts Act 1981; Statute Law (Repeals) Act 1993; Merchant Shipping Act 1995; Private International Law (Miscellaneous Provisions) Act 1995; Arbitration Act 1996; Constitutional Reform Act 2005
Repealed by	Scotland: Arbitration (Scotland) Act 2010

Status: Partially repealed

Text of statute as originally enacted

Text of the Arbitration Act 1950 as in force today (including any amendments) within the United Kingdom, from legislation.gov.uk.

The Arbitration Act 1950 (14 Geo. 6. c. 27) is an act of the Parliament of the United Kingdom that consolidated and amended arbitration law in England and Wales.

Although the act has now largely been superseded by the Arbitration Act 1996, part II of the act (dealing with the enforcement of non-New York Convention awards) remains in force. This is principally to preserve the enforcement mechanism for awards made under the (now largely obsolete) Geneva Protocol (1924).

The main purpose of the act was to consolidate and rationalise the prior statutes regulating arbitration. However the 1950 act became increasingly subject to criticism because of the power of the courts to review arbitration awards under section 21. That section required the arbitration tribunal to make a "statement of case" on any matter of law which was reviewable by the court. This was unpopular and led to loss of arbitration business in the United Kingdom, and led to the repeal of the provisions under the Arbitration Act 1979.

== Provisions ==
=== Repealed enactments ===
Section 44(3) of the act repealed 4 enactments, listed in that section.

Citation	Short title	Extent of repeal
52 & 53 Vict. c. 49	Arbitration Act 1889	The whole act.
14 & 15 Geo. 5. c. 39	Arbitration Clauses (Protocol) Act 1924	The whole act.
20 & 21 Geo. 5. c. 15	Arbitration (Foreign Awards) Act 1930	The whole act.
24 & 25 Geo. 5. c. 14	Arbitration Act 1934	The whole act.
