= Gross negligence =

Lack of slight diligence or care

Gross negligence is the "lack of slight diligence or care" or "a conscious, voluntary act or omission in reckless disregard of a legal duty and of the consequences to another party." In some jurisdictions a person injured as a result of gross negligence may be able to recover punitive damages from the person who caused the injury or loss.

Negligence is the opposite of diligence, or being careful. The standard of ordinary negligence is what conduct deviates from that of a "reasonable person". By extension, if somebody has been grossly negligent, that means they have fallen so far below the ordinary standard of care that one can expect, to warrant the label of being "gross". Gross negligence may thus be described as reflecting "the want of even slight or scant care", falling below the level of care that even a careless person would be expected to follow. While some jurisdictions equate the culpability of gross negligence with that of recklessness, most differentiate it from simple negligence in its degree.

== Criminal law ==
Gross negligence is used as a standard for criminal law, for example, under manslaughter in English law. Under common law, criminal negligence is defined as a gross deviation from a reasonable standard of care. This is a higher standard than ordinary negligence under tort law.

In the U.K., a conviction for gross negligence manslaughter requires that the prosecutor prove the existence of a duty of care, breach of that duty by the defendant resulting in death, and a risk of death that would be obvious to a reasonable prudent person in the position of the defendant.

== Private law ==
=== English law ===
The concept of gross negligence is broadly distrusted by English law. In Wilson v Brett, Baron Rolfe (later Lord Cranworth) said that he:

could see no difference between negligence and gross negligence; that it was the same thing, with the addition of a vituperative epithet.

This view has been consistently approved in English law relating to fiduciary duties, as the courts have reasserted that there is only one standard of culpable carelessness: ordinary negligence. The preferred view has been that the context of a trustee, company director or other fiduciary's judgment is to be taken into account when the judge reviews the exercise of discretion. In Houghland v RR Low (Luxury Coaches) Ltd., Ormerod LJ said,

I have always found some difficulty in understanding just what was "gross negligence", because it appears to me that the standard of care required in a case of bailment, or any other type of case, is the standard demanded by the circumstances of that particular case.

The leading case is Armitage v Nurse where Millett LJ, was asked to decide whether an exclusion clause was effective to absolve a trustee from an accusation of negligence when applying property to beneficiaries. It was held that exclusion clauses were still effective (though other remedies could follow, such as UCTA 1977 in a contract law case) but on the point of principle, as a default position all trustees are liable for ordinary negligence. Millett LJ said,

It would be very surprising if our law drew the line between liability for ordinary negligence and liability for gross negligence. In this respect English law differs from civil law systems, for it has always drawn a sharp distinction between negligence, however gross, on the one hand and fraud, bad faith and wilful misconduct on the other. The doctrine of the common law is that: "Gross negligence may be evidence of mala fides, but is not the same thing": see Goodman v. Harvey (1836) 4 A. & E. 870, 876, per Lord Denman C.J. But while we regard the difference between fraud on the one hand and mere negligence, however gross, on the other as a difference in kind, we regard the difference between negligence and gross negligence as merely one of degree. English lawyers have always had a healthy disrespect for the latter distinction. In Hinton v. Dibbin (1842) 2 Q.B. 646 Lord Denman C.J. doubted whether any intelligible distinction exists; while in Grill v. General Iron Screw Collier Co. (1866) L.R. 1 C.P. 600, 612 Willes J. famously observed that gross negligence is ordinary negligence with a vituperative epithet. But civilian systems draw the line in a different place. The doctrine is culpa lata dolo aequiparatur; and although the maxim itself is not Roman the principle is classical. There is no room for the maxim in the common law; it is not mentioned in Broom's Legal Maxims, 10th ed. (1939).

=== United States ===
Under United States law, proof of gross negligence involves proving all of the elements of an ordinary negligence action, plus the additional element that the defendant acted in reckless disregard of, or with a lack of substantial concern for, the rights of others. For some causes of action that might trigger defenses such as governmental immunity, it may be necessary to prove gross negligence in order to overcome the defense.

== Roman law ==
Roman lawyers had an axiom that gross negligence amounts to an intentional wrong, or culpa lata dolo aequiparatur.

== See also ==
- Negligence
