= Hashira Island =

Island in Yamaguchi Prefecture, Japan

Hashira Island Hashira-jima (柱島)
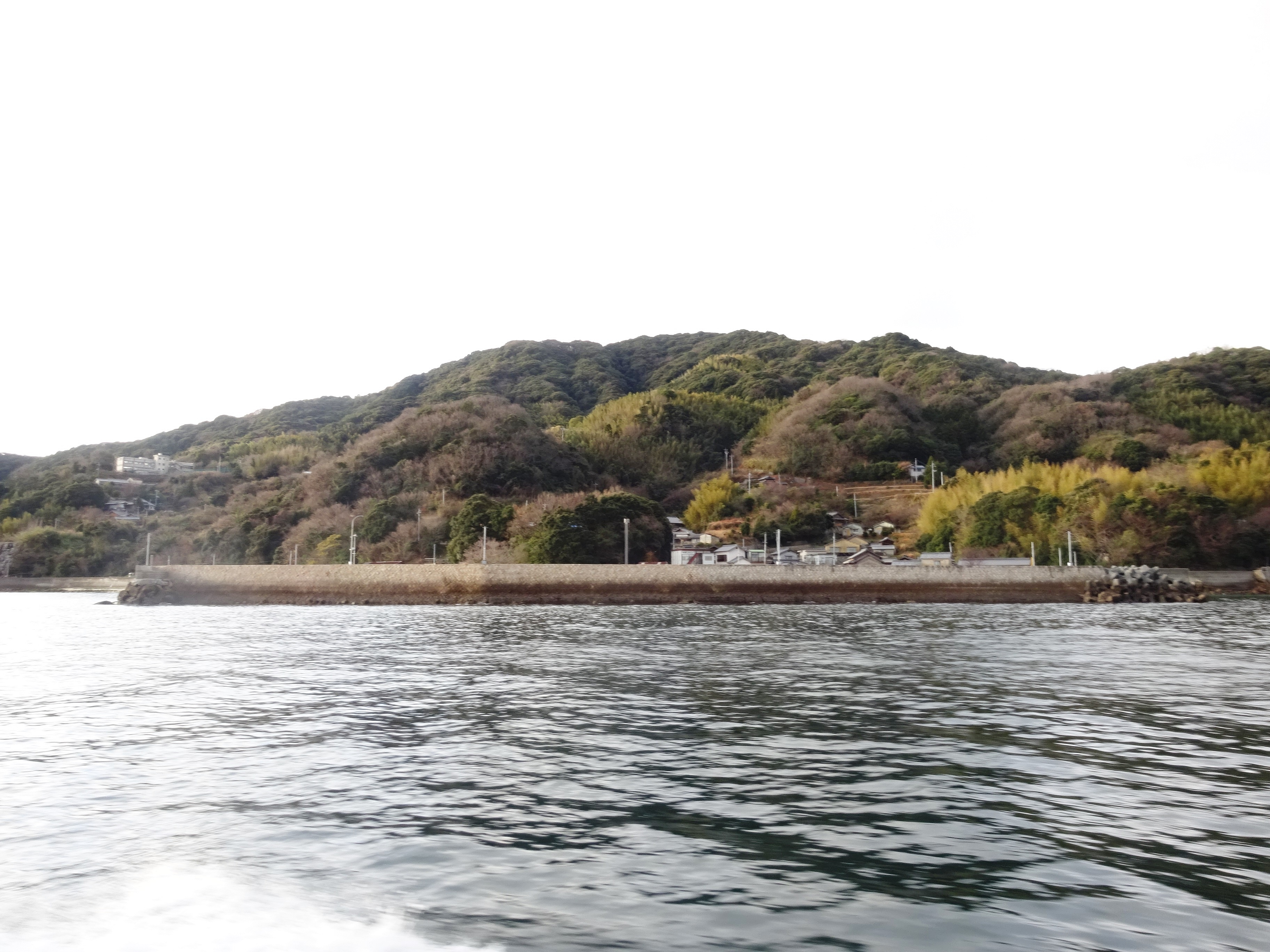
- Hashira Island
- Interactive map of Hashira Island
- Coordinates: 34°01′N 132°25′E

Area
  - Total: 3.12 km^{2} (1.20 sq mi)
- Highest elevation: 290 m (950 ft)
- Lowest elevation: 0 m (0 ft)

Population (2013)
  - Total: 184
  - Density: 59/km^{2} (150/sq mi)

Hashira Island (Japanese: 柱島, Hepburn: Hashira-jima) is an island in southern Hiroshima Bay in the Inland Sea, Yamaguchi Prefecture, Japan. Located 26 kilometres (16 mi) southeast of Iwakuni, it is part of the Kutsuna Islands within the Bōyo Islands group. The island covers 3.12 square kilometres (1.20 mi^{2}) and as of 2013 had a population of 184 residents.

The highest point on the island is Mt. Kinzō. Economic activity on the island consists of fishing and cultivation of vegetables and citrus fruit. Hashirajima is connected to the port at Iwakuni Mondays through Saturdays by a high speed ferry.

The island is best known for its association in World War II with the surrounding Hashirajima Anchoring Area, located 30 to 40 kilometres (16 to 22 nmi; 19 to 25 mi) south of the naval base at Kure, Hiroshima. Warships of the Imperial Japanese Navy that did not need dock repairs would anchor at Hashirajima, and it was also used as a staging area before fleet departures. It was also the site of the loss of the Japanese battleship Mutsu, which suffered an internal explosion and sank there on 8 June 1943.
