= McFarlane v Tayside Health Board =

1999 House of Lords case concerning negligence and delict

- Court: House of Lords
- Full case name: McFarlane and Another v Tayside Health Board
- Decided: Nov 25, 1999
- Citation: [2000] 2 AC 59

Court membership
- Judges sitting: Lord Slynn of Hadley, Lord Steyn, Lord Hope of Craighead, Lord Clyde and Lord Millett.

Case opinions
- Lord Slynn of Hadley, Lord Steyn, Lord Hope of Craighead, Lord Clyde, and Lord Millett.
- Majority: Lord Slynn, Lord Hope.
- Concurrence: Lord Clyde and Lord Steyn.
- Dissent: Lord Millett

Area of law
- Negligence

McFarlane v Tayside Health Board [2000] 2 AC 59 is a leading House of Lords decision concerning wrongful birth in the English law of negligence, though the case was Scottish. The specific ratio decidendi of the decision is debated, but the judgments provide guidance and authoritative discussion used in later cases.

== Facts ==
The pursuers decided that they did not want to have any more children. The husband had a vasectomy. The surgeon was employed by Tayside Health Board, the defendant. After the surgery, the surgeon told the husband that contraceptives were no longer necessary. The wife became pregnant and gave birth to a healthy child.

== Claim ==
The pursuers alleged loss was caused by negligence on the part of the health board. The couple claimed on two bases: first, the physical discomfort suffered by the wife from the pregnancy, confinement, and delivery; second, the financial costs for the caring of and bringing up of a child.

The Outer House of the Court of Session dismissed the action. They held that a normal pregnancy could not constitute personal injury damages. The benefits of the child were held to have outweighed any of the cost associated.

The Inner House of the Court of Session reversed the decision, saying that the wife was entitled to damages for the effects of pregnancy, and the benefits associated with parenthood were not required to be balanced against the loss.

== House of Lords Decision ==
Lord Slynn held that the doctor had a duty of care in regards to the pregnancy, but not towards the costs of rearing the child:

"The doctor undertakes a duty of care in regard to the prevention of pregnancy: it does not follow that the duty includes also avoiding the costs of rearing the child if born and accepted into the family. Whilst I have no doubts that there should be compensation for the physical effects of the pregnancy and birth... I consider that it is not fair, just or reasonable to impose on the doctor or his employer liability for the consequential responsibilities, imposed on or accepted by the parents to bring up the child."

Lord Hope held that the claim was entirely for economic loss, which is generally not recoverable. However, the benefits of the raising of the child were to be balanced with the costs of raising the child. Since the benefits are incalculable, but the costs are, the costs of raising the child are not recoverable as damages.

"It would not be fair, just or reasonable, in any assessment of the loss caused by the birth of the child, to leave these benefits out of account... The costs can be calculated but the benefits, which in fairness must be set against them, cannot. The logical conclusion, as a matter of law, is that the costs to the pursuers of meeting their obligations to the child during her childhood are not recoverable as damages."

Lord Steyn and Lord Millett both advanced policy arguments. Lord Millett argued that a society must consider the balance of cost and blessing as beneficial. Lord Steyn advances a distributive justice argument, that the court needed to consider whether spreading the burden across society was just, which for wrongful conception, it was not.

== See also ==
- Medical Negligence
- Duty of Care in English Law
