= La règle de non-cumul =

La règle de non-cumul is a principle of French law which regulates whether an action should be brought under contract law (la responsibilité civile) or tort law (la responsibilité delictuelle).

It states that where there is a contract, an action can only be brought under contract law and when there is no contract an action can only be brought under tort law.

== See also ==
- Henderson v Merrett Syndicates Ltd, a House of Lords decision which acknowledged that this rule does not exist in English law.
