= Michael Hutchison (judge) =

British lawyer & judge (1933–2017)

The Right Honourable Sir Michael Hutchison

Lord Justice of Appeal
- In office 1995–1999

Justice of the High Court
- In office 1983–1995

Personal details
- Born: Michael Hutchison; 13 October 1933
- Died: 24 July 2017 (aged 83)
- Education: Lancing College; Clare College, Cambridge

Sir Michael Hutchison, PC (13 October 1933 – 24 July 2017) was a British lawyer and judge who served as a Lord Justice of Appeal from 1995 to 1999.

== Biography ==
The son of Ernest and Frances Hutchison, Michael Hutchison was educated at Lancing College and Clare College, Cambridge. He was called to the Bar by Gray's Inn in 1958, and became a Queen's Counsel in 1976. He was a Recorder from 1975 to 1983, and was elected a Bencher of Gray's Inn in 1983.

He was appointed a Justice of the High Court in 1983, received the customary knighthood, and was assigned to the Queen's Bench Division. he was a Judge of the Employment Appeal Tribunal from 1984 to 1987 and Presiding Judge, Western Circuit from 1989 to 1992. He was appointed a Lord Justice of Appeal in 1995, serving until 1999.

He was a member of the Judicial Studies Board from 1985 to 1987, a member of the Parole Board from 1987 to 1989, and was a Surveillance Commissioner from 1998 to 2006.

Hutchison married Mary Spettigue in 1957; they had two sons and three daughters.
