= Bōyo Islands =

Group of islands in the Inland Sea, Japan

Coordinates: 34°5′16.53″N 132°41′24.45″E

The Bōyo Islands (防予諸島, Bōyo-shotō or Hōyo-shotō) are a group of 41 islands that belong to Yamaguchi and Ehime Prefectures in the Inland Sea. The largest by far is Suō-Ōshima, or Yashiro Island.

== List of islands ==
The islands are categorized into the following groups:

- Heigun-tō, 平郡島
- Suō Oshima Islands
  - Suō-Ōshima, or Yashiro Island
  - Nasake-jima, 情島
  - Okikamuro Island, # 沖家室島
  - 3 others
  - 5 in the Kumage group
- Kutsuna Islands (29)
  - Nakashima Island (Ehime)
  - Kuwaji Island, 津和地島
  - Newaji Island, 怒和島
  - Futakami Island, 二神島
  - Muzuki Island, 睦月島
  - Nogutsuna Island, 野忽那島
  - Yuri Island, 由利島
  - Tsurushi Island, 釣島 (uninhabited)
  - Gogo Island, 興居島 (uninhabited)
  - Hashima Island (Yamaguchi), 端島 (山口県) (uninhabited)
  - Hashira Island, 柱島
  - 18 more uninhabited
