= Nestle v National Westminster Bank plc =

- Court: Court of Appeal
- Decided: 6 May 1992
- Citations: [1992] EWCA Civ 12, [1993] 1 WLR 1260

Case history
- Prior actions: [2000] WTLR 795; Independent, July 4, 1988, (1996) 10(1) Trust law International 113, 115

Court membership
- Judges sitting: Staughton LJ, Dillon LJ, Leggatt LJ

Keywords
- Trustees, duty of care, investment

Nestle v National Westminster Bank plc [1992] EWCA Civ 12 is an English trusts law case concerning the duty of care when a trustee is making an investment.

== Facts ==
A testator died in 1922 and named his widow, two sons and wives and one grandchild as the beneficiaries. The wife got the family home as a life interest and a tax free annuity. The two sons got annuities between age 21 and 25 and life interests in half the trust with a power to appoint income to their wives and Georgina, the grandchild, got the remainder. In 1922 there was £53,963 and in 1986 when Georgina became entitled, there was £269,203. She claimed that had the fund been invested properly it would have been worth well over £1m. The trust company had failed to conduct periodic reviews of investments. They invested in tax-exempt gilts because the sons were domiciled abroad, meaning exemption from inheritance tax.

== Judgment ==
=== High Court ===
Hoffmann J (as he then was) held that there was no breach of the duty of care. He said the following.

IV. The Investment Duties of Trustees

1.The Law

There was no dispute over the general principles to be applied. First, there is the prudence principle. The classic statement is that of Lindley LJ (Re Whiteley (1886) 33 Ch D 347, 355):

"The duty of a trustee is not to take such care only as a prudent man would take if he had only himself to consider, the duty rather is to take such care as an ordinary prudent man would take if he were minded to make an investment for the benefit of other people for whom he felt morally bound to provide."

This is an extremely flexible standard capable of adaptation to current economic conditions and contemporary understanding of markets and investments. For example, investments which were imprudent in the days of the gold standard may be sound and sensible in times of high inflation. Modern trustees acting within their investment powers are entitled to be judged by the standards of current portfolio theory, which emphasises the risk level of the entire portfolio rather than the risk attaching to each investment taken in isolation. (This is not to say that losses on investments made in breach of trust can be set off against gains in the rest of the portfolio but only that an investment which in isolation is too risky and therefore in breach of trust may be justified when held in conjunction with other investments. See Jeffrey N Gordon, The Puzzling Persistence of the Constrained Prudent Man Rule (1987) 62 NY Univ LR 52) But in reviewing the conduct of trustees over a period of more than 60 years, one must be careful not to endow the prudent trustee with prophetic vision or expect him to have ignored the received wisdom of his time.

Mr Gerard Wright, who appeared for Miss Nestle, referred me to another passage in Re Whiteley at p 350 in which Cotton LJ said:

"Trustees are bound to preserve the money for those entitled to the corpus in remainder, and they are bound to invest it in such a way as will produce a reasonable income for those enjoying the income for the present."

In 1886 what Cotton LJ had in mind was the safety of the capital in purely monetary terms. But Mr Wright submitted that in the conditions which prevail a century later, the trustees were under an overriding duty to preserve the real value of the capital. In my judgment this cannot be right. The preservation of the monetary value of the capital requires no skill or luck. The trustees can discharge their duties, as they often did until 1961, by investing the whole fund in gilt-edged securities. Preservation of real values can be no more than an aspiration which some trustees may have the good fortune to achieve. Plainly they must have regard to the interests of those entitled in the future to capital and such regard will require them to take into consideration the potential effects of inflation, but a rule that real capital values must be maintained would be unfair to both income beneficiaries and trustees.

This brings me to the second principle on which there was general agreement, namely that the trustee must act fairly in making investment decisions which may have different consequences for different classes of beneficiaries. There are two reasons why I prefer this formulation to the traditional image of holding the scales equally between tenant for life and remainderman. The first is that the image of the scales suggests a weighing of known quantities whereas investment decisions are concerned with predictions of the future. Investments will carry current expectations of their future income yield and capital appreciation and these expectations will be reflected in their current market price, but there is always a greater or lesser risk that the outcome will deviate from those expectations. A judgment on the fairness of the choices made by the trustees must have regard to these imponderables. The second reason is that the image of the scales suggests a more mechanistic process than I believe the law requires. The trustees have in my judgment a wide discretion. They are for example entitled to take into account the income needs of the tenant for life or the fact that the tenant for life was a person known to the settlor and a primary object of the trust whereas the remainderman is a remoter relative or a stranger. Of course these cannot be allowed to become the overriding considerations but the concept of fairness between classes of beneficiaries does not require them to be excluded. It would be an inhuman law which required trustees to adhere to some mechanical rule for preserving the real value of the capital when the tenant for life was the testator's widow who had fallen upon hard times and the remainderman was young and well off.

=== Court of Appeal ===
Staughton LJ held there was no breach of trust. Despite this the trust company fell ‘woefully short of maintaining the real value of the fund, let alone matching the average increase in price of ordinary shares’. The company had not acted ‘conscientiously, fairly and carefully’ and there was ‘not much for the bank to be proud of in its administration of the… trust’.

At times it will not be easy to decide what is an equitable balance’ between life tenants and remaindermen. Some regard for the facts should be had, ‘not necessarily by seeking the highest possible income at the expense of capital, but by inclining in that direction.

He emphasised that ‘trustees’ performance must not be judged with hindsight: 'after the event even a fool is wise, as a poet said nearly 3,000 years ago…' and accepted evidence that equities were regarded as risky before 1959. ‘It was only in 1959 that [they became more popular].’

Dillon LJ and Leggatt LJ concurred.

== See also ==
- English trusts law
- English contract law
