= Law of France =

French law has a dual jurisdictional system comprising private law (droit privé), also known as judicial law, and public law (droit public).

Schema of jurisdictional dualism in the French legal system

Judicial law includes, in particular:

- Civil law (droit civil)
- Criminal law (droit pénal)

Public law includes, in particular:

- Administrative law (droit administratif)
- Constitutional law (droit constitutionnel)

Together, in practical terms, these four areas of law (civil, criminal, administrative and constitutional) constitute the major part of French law.

The Constitutional Court, (Conseil Constitutionnel) is a court that only examines the constitutional review of French law. While this court makes decisions, it is up to the two orders of private law and public law to solve how to comply with the constitutional court's findings. This includes any sort of findings when conflicts arise between French law and European Union law.

== Sources of law ==
Legislation is seen as the primary source of French law. Unlike in common law jurisdictions, where a collection of cases and practices (known as the "common law") historically form the basis of law, the French legal system emphasizes statutes as the primary source of law. Despite this emphasis, some bodies of law, like French administrative law, were primarily created by the courts (the highest administrative court, the Conseil d'État). Lawyers often look to case law (la jurisprudence) and legal scholarship (la doctrine) for reliable, but non-binding, interpretation and statements of the law.

=== Legislative sources ===
French legislative sources can be classified into four categories:

1. Constitutional laws,
2. Treaties,
3. Parliamentary statutes (loi), and
4. Government regulations (règlements).

==== Hierarchy of norms ====
French legislation follows a hierarchy of norms (hiérarchie des normes). Constitutional laws are superior to all other sources, then treaties, then parliamentary statutes (loi), then government regulations. Legislation enacted by orders (ordonnances) and regulations issued by the executive under Art. 38 of the constitution (Règlements autonomes) have the same status as parliamentary statutes.

==== EU law and international treaties ====
European Union treaties and EU law enacted under the authority of EU treaties are superior to domestic law. French courts consider the French Constitution to be superior to international treaties, including EU treaties and EU law. This is in contrast to EU institutions, which sees EU law as superior to the laws of member states.

==== Legislation ====
There are several categories of legislation:

- Organic statutes (Lois organiques) are laws on areas specified in the Constitution, like presidential elections and the status of judges. Organic statutes must be referred to the Constitutional Council before they are passed, under Art. 46 of the Constitution.
- Referendum statutes (Lois référendaires) are laws adopted by referendum. The President has the power to refer certain bills, on the organization of public powers, social, economic, and environmental policy or the ratification of a treaty to a referendum, under Art. 11 of the Constitution.
- Orders (ordonnances) are legislative instruments issued by the executive, following Parliament delegation of law-making power in specific areas. Parliament first delegates law-making power on an area, along with the general contours of the law. Orders are then issued by the Council of Ministers, after consultation with the Council of State (normally a judicial institution) in its administrative capacity. Orders are usually valid for three to six months and need to be not voted down by Parliament at the end of the period to gain the status of statutes. Prior to approval they are considered regulations. New codes and major legal reforms are often enacted by orders.
- Ordinary statutes (Lois ordinaires) enacted by the French Parliament, concerning only matters listed in Art. 34 of the Constitution. These matters include civil liberties, nationality, civil status, taxes, criminal law, and criminal procedure. However, contrary to the expectations of the 1958 Constitution, Parliament has often had a majority supporting the government. This political reality meant that Parliament's legislative domain has been, in practice, expanded to include any important topic. Subjects included in Art. 34 cannot be delegated to the government, other than by orders.
- Regulations (règlement) are legislations produced by the executive power. There are two types of regulations:
  - Règlements autonomes: under Art. 38 of the Constitution, any subject not expressly specified in Art. 34 is left entirely to the executive. The legislative power is thus shared between the Parliament and the executive. Règlements autonomes have the force of law.
  - Règlements d'application are rules arising from parliamentary delegation, analogous to delegated legislation in the United Kingdom. They can be challenged in administrative courts as contrary to the delegating statute.

==== Circulaires ====
By contrast, administrative circulaires are not law, but merely instructions by government ministries. Circulaires are nonetheless important in guiding public officials and judges. For example, the Circulaire of 14 May 1993 contains detailed instructions for prosecutors and judges on how to apply new rules in the 1992 revised criminal code. Circularies are not considered sources of law in private courts, but are sometimes considered binding in administrative courts. As such, the binding circulaires règlementaires are reviewed like other administrative acts, and can be found illegal if they contravene a parliamentary statute.

=== Case law ===
Case law (la jurisprudence) is not binding and is not an official source of law, although it has been de facto highly influential.^{56} French courts have recognized their role in gradually shaping the law through judicial decisions, and the fact that they develop judicial doctrine, especially through jurisprudence constante (a consistent set of case law). There is no law prohibiting the citation of precedents and lower courts often do. Although the highest courts, the Court of Cassation and the Council of State do not cite precedents in their decisions, previous cases are prominent in arguments of the ministère public and the commissaire du gouvernement, in draft opinions, and in internal files.

Some areas of French law even primarily consist of case law. For example, tort liability in private law is primarily elaborated by judges, from only five articles (articles 1382–1386) in the Civil Code. Scholars have suggested that, in these fields of law, French judges are creating law much like common law judges.^{82} Case law is also the primary source for principles in French administrative law. Many of the Constitutional Council's decisions are critical for understanding French constitutional law.

The differences between French case law and case law in common law systems appear to be: (1) it is not cited in the highest courts; (2) lower courts are theoretically free to depart from higher courts, although they risk their decisions being overturned; and (3) courts must not solely cite case law as a basis of decision in the absence of a recognized source of law.

French judicial decisions, especially in its highest courts, are written in a highly laconic and formalist style, incomprehensible to non-lawyers. While judges do consider practical implications and policy debates, they are not at all reflected in the written decision. This has led scholars to criticize the courts for being overly formalistic and even disingenuous, for maintaining the facade of judges only interpreting legal rules and arriving at deductive results.

=== Codes ===
Following the example of the Napoleonic Civil Code, French legal codes aim to set out authoritatively and logically the principles and rules in an area of law. In theory, codes should go beyond the compilation of discrete statues, and instead state the law in a coherent and comprehensive piece of legislation, sometimes introducing major reforms or starting anew.

There are about 78 legal codes in France currently in force, which deal with both the French public and private law categorically. These codes are published for free by the French government on a website called Légifrance.

In 1989, the French government set up the Commission Supérieure de Codification, tasked with codifying laws. The Commission has worked with ministries to introduce new codes and codify existing legislation. Unlike the transformative Civil Code under Napoleon, the goal of the modern codification project is to clarify and make more accessible statutes in by compiling one code in a particular area of law and remove contradictions. Despite this, areas very often overlap and codes necessarily cannot contain all of the law in a given field.

== History ==
In the High Middle Ages, most legal situations in France were highly local, regulated by customs and practices in local communities. Historians tend to be attracted by the large regional or urban customs, rather than local judicial norms and practices. Beginning in the 12th century, Roman law emerged as a scholarly discipline, initially with professors from Bologna starting to teach the Justinian Code in southern France and in Paris. Despite this, Roman law was largely academic and disconnected from application, especially in the north.

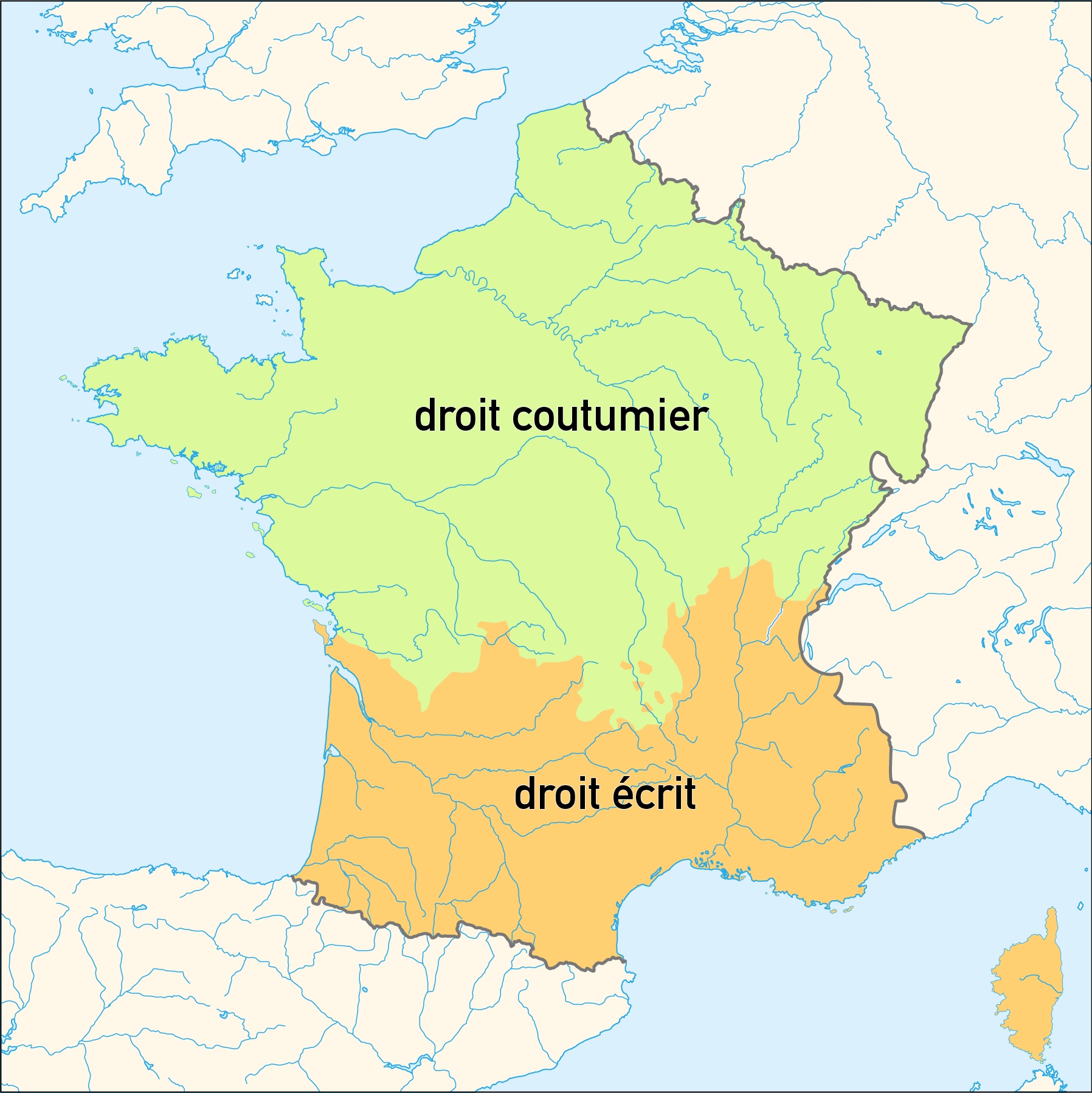
Zone of customary law in the north and written law in the south

Historians traditionally mark a distinction between Pays de droit écrit in southern France and the Pays de droit coutumier in the north. In the south, it was thought that Roman law had survived, whereas in the north it had been displaced by customs after the Germanic conquest. Historians now tend to think that Roman law was more influential on the customs of southern France due to its medieval revival. By the 13th century, there would be explicit recognition of using Roman law in the south of France, justified by the understanding of a longstanding tradition of using Roman law in the custom of southern France. In the North, private and unofficial compilations of local customs in different regions began to emerge in the 13th and 14th centuries. These compilations were often drafted by judges who needed to decide cases based on unwritten customs, and the authors often incorporated Roman law, procedures from canon law, royal legislation and parliamentary decisions.

In the early modern period, laws in France gradually went through unification, rationalization, and centralization. After the Hundred Years War, French kings began to assert authority over the kingdom in a quest of institutional centralization. Through the creation of a centralized absolute monarchy, an administrative and judicial system under the king also emerged by the second half of the fifteenth century. Royal legislation also greatly increased beginning in the 15th century.

The Ordinance of Montils-les-Tours (1454) was an important juncture in this period, as it ordered the official recording and homologation of customary law. Customs would be compiled by local practitioners and approved by local assemblies of the three estates, with disagreements resolved by the central court. At the time, the wholesale adoption of Roman law and the ius commune would be unrealistic, as the king’s authority was insufficient to impose a unified legal system in all French provinces. In the process of recording, local customs were sometimes simplified or reformed. By the 16th century, around sixty general customs were recorded and given official status, disqualifying any unrecorded customs from having official status. Roman law remained as a reserve, to be used for argumentation and to supplement customary law.

Accompanying the process of centralization and mercantilism, the king effectively initiated processes of codification in the mid 17th century. Jean-Baptiste Colbert, the Minister of Finance and later also Secretary of the Navy in charge of the colonial empire and trade, was main architect of the codes. The first of such codes is the 1667 Ordinance of Civil Procedure (officially known as the Ordonnance pour la reformation de la justice), which established clear and uniform procedural rules, replacing previous rules in all royal jurisdictions and in the colonies. The 1667 Ordinance is the main inspiration of the Code de procedure civile passed in 1806 under Napoleon. Other codes include the 1670 Criminal Ordinance, the 1673 Ordinance for Overland Trade (Code Marchand), and the 1681 Ordinance for Maritime Trade (Code de la Marine). Ordinances would later be drawn up on Donations (1731), Wills (1735), Falsifications (1737), and Trustees (1747), but a unified code of private law would not be passed until 1804, under Napoleon and after the French Revolution. Under King Louis XV, there would be a constant struggle between royal legislation, traditional conceptions of the law of the Realm (customs and Roman law), and parliamentary arrêts de règlements (regulatory decisions). Judges sided with the local parliaments (judicial bodies in France) and the landed aristocracy, undermining royal authority and legislation.

Even before the French Revolution, French enlightenment thinkers like Jean-Jacques Rousseau, with a theory of natural rights, and especially Montesquieu, who advocated for a separation of powers, were major influences on the law throughout Europe and the United States.

The French legal system underwent great changes after the French Revolution beginning in 1789, which swept away the old regime. By 1790, the National Constituent Assembly overhauled the country’s judicial system. A Penal Code would be adopted by 1791. The Civil Code (1804), the Code of Civil Procedure (1806), and the Commercial Code (1807) were adopted under Napoleon, reflecting Roman law, pre-revolutionary ordinances and custom, scholarly legal writings, enlightenment ideas, and Napoleon's personal vision of the law. These codes consisted of numbered articles, were written in elegant French, and were meant to be understood by the layman. In addition, they introduced many classically liberal reforms, such as abolishing remaining feudal institutions and establishing rights of personality, property and contract for all male French citizens.

However, not all the old regime's law were repleted, the articles 110 and 111 of the 1539 Ordinance of Villers-Cotterêts being the oldest still in use in the French legislation.

== Private law ==
The term civil law in France refers to private law (laws between private citizens, and should be distinguished from the group of legal systems descended from Roman Law known as civil law, as opposed to common law.

The major private law codes include:

- The Civil Code,
- The Code of Civil Procedure,
- The Commercial Code, and
- The Intellectual Property Code.

=== Civil procedure ===
France follows an inquisitorial model, where the judge leads the proceedings and the gathering of evidence, acting in the public interest to bring out the truth of a case. This is contrasted with the adversarial model often seen in common law countries, where parties in the case play a primary role in the judicial process. In French civil cases, one party has the burden of proof, according to law, but both sides and the judge together gather and provide evidence. There is no strict standard of proof in civil cases, like the preponderance of the evidence under American law; instead, primacy is given to the judge's intime conviction, based on the principle of "free evaluation of the evidence."

The court gathers a dossier of pleadings, statements of fact and evidence from the parties and makes it available to them. Proceedings focus on written evidence and written argument, with brief hearings. Witness testimonies are uncommon. The ministère public, an independent judicial official, sometimes plays an advisory role in civil proceedings. In principle, the first level of appellate court reviews questions of both fact and law, and it is able to do so because of the dossier. It can also order additional investigations and production of evidence. The Court of Cassation (highest civil appellate court) generally only decides questions of law and remands the case for further proceedings.

=== Criminal law ===
French criminal law is governed first and foremost by the Criminal code and the Code of criminal procedure. The Criminal Code, for example, prohibits violent offenses such as homicide, assault and many pecuniary offenses such as theft or money laundering, and provides general sentencing guidelines. However, a number of criminal offenses, e.g., slander and libel, have not been codified but are instead addressed by separate statutes.

==== Criminal procedure ====
After a crime occurs, the police make initial investigations. The prosecutor (procureur) or, in some serious cases, the juge d’instruction then control or supervise the police investigation and decide whether to prosecute. Unlike common law countries and many civil law countries, French prosecutors are members of the judicial branch. Issuing arrest warrants or formally questioning the accused or witnesses must receive judicial approval, but decisions on searches and phone-tapping are often delegated to the police because of limited judicial resources. There are also simplified procedures for crimes in flagrante delicto and crimes relating to terrorism and drugs.

Other judges then preside at the criminal trial, typically without a jury. However, the most serious cases tried by the cour d’assises (a branch of the Court of Appeal) involve three judges and nine jurors who jointly determine the verdict and sentencing. Like civil proceedings, criminal proceedings focus on written evidence and written argument, although witnesses are usually also heard orally. Judges or prosecutors order independent experts for the proceeding, if necessary. One appeal can be made on questions of fact and law, save for decisions of the cour d’assises. Appeals may also be made to the Court of Cassation on questions of law. Other judges (the juge de l’application des peines) supervise the sentence and deal with parole.

== Public law ==
Public law is concerned with the powers and organization of the state and governmental bodies.

=== Constitutional law ===
French constitutional law includes not only the Constitution itself, but also its preamble which incorporates a list of norms known as bloc de constitutionnalité, including the "Freedom of Association" provision of the Conseil Constitutionnel.

- Rights listed in the 1789 Declaration of the Rights of Man and of the Citizen: including classical liberal rights on individual freedom, right to property and contract, and equality.
- Social and economic rights listed in the preamble to the former 1946 Constitution: including the rights to health, education, trade union activity, and work.
- Fundamental principles recognized by the laws of the Republic: in theory this composes of freedoms and liberties recognized by legislation in the Third Republic, although courts have taken some liberty to expand such principles.
- Rights in the 2004 Charter for the Environment: including abstract principles such as the principle of sustainable development.

The Constitutional Council (Conseil Constitutionnel) has the exclusive authority to judge the constitutionality of parliamentary statutes. Although originally conceived as a political body, it is now seen much like a judicial one. The President, Prime Minister, the presidents of both houses of Parliament, and a group of 60 members from either of the two houses may refer bills or treaties to the Constitutional Council. In addition, when individuals allege that their constitutional rights are infringed by legislation in a court proceeding, the Court of Cassation or the Council of State may refer the matter to the Constitutional Council for a ruling on its constitutionality.

=== Administrative law ===
In France, most claims against local or national governments are handled by the administrative courts, for which the Conseil d'État (Council of State) is a court of last resort. The main administrative courts are the tribunaux administratifs and their appeal courts. The French body of administrative law is called droit administratif. Administrative procedure were originally developed by case law but have been statutorily affirmed in the Code de justice administrative in 2000.

French administrative law focuses on proper functioning of government and the public good, rather than constraining the government. French public bodies include governments and public organizations or enterprises, subject to different sets of rules, with both privileges and additional limitations compared to private actors. Public bodies have tremendous powers, including police powers (pouvoirs de police) to regulate public health or public order, and to expropriate property. Public bodies must exercise their powers in the public interest, according to principles such as continuity of services (which has been used to limit the power to strike), adaptability (changing in accordance with external circumstances), equality and neutrality (in relation to, e.g. one's religion or political beliefs).

All acts must have a legal basis (base légale), follow the right procedure (sometimes including right to a hearing), and done with a purpose to further public interest. The court also reviews facts (including subjective judgments based on facts, like the architectural value of a building), and interpret the law. There are also three levels of scrutiny, namely:

- maximum control (ascertain both the correctness of the facts and the appropriateness of the evaluation),
- normal control (ensuring that the facts are sufficient to justify the decision and that the law had been interpreted correctly), and
- minimum control (only interfere where the administration has manifestly exceeded its powers, including manifest error in evaluation and disproportionate decisions).

Recourses provided by the court include damages, setting aside contracts, amending contracts, quashing an administrative decision, or interpret the law (only available to the Council of State, although lower courts may refer questions to it). Different procedures exist depending on the recourse sought. Injunctions are rare but can be issued in certain procedures (référés).

Certain executive measures, known as actes de gouvernement, are not subject to judicial review. Examples include the President’s decisions to resume nuclear testing, suspend financial aid to Iraq, dissolve the National Assembly, award honors, or grant amnesty. Other nonjusticiable acts include certain internal affairs of government ministries (Mesures d’ordre interne), e.g. the decision to alter the frequency of services, unless doing so is against the law.

==== Administrative procedure ====
Before judicial recourse, one may request administrative appeals (recours préalable) by the official or his superior, although they are of limited use. Legal aid is available like in civil and criminal cases, although lawyers are unnecessary in many cases because under the French inquisitorial legal system, judges have primary control of cases after their introduction. All administrative decisions must be challenged within two months of their being taken and no waiver is possible for lapses.

To begin a case, an individual only need to write a letter to describe his identity, the grounds of challenging the decision, and the relief sought, and provide a copy of the administrative action; legal arguments are unnecessary in the initial stage. A court rapporteur will gather information (he has the power to request documents from the public body), compile written arguments from both sides, and request expert assessments if necessary. The files and the rapporteur's recommendations are transferred to a Commissaire du gouvernement, who also makes his own recommendations to the judges. Written evidence is relied upon and oral hearings are extremely short. After the hearing, judges deliberate and issue their judgement, in which they will briefly respond to parties' arguments.

Standing requirements in French administrative law are relatively lax. Although merely being a taxpayer is insufficient, those affected in a "special, certain and direct" manner (including moral interests) will have standing. In addition, users of public service can generally challenge decisions on those services. Associations can also have standing in some circumstances.

== European Union law ==
The French Constitution specifically authorizes France's participation in the European Union (EU), an economic and political union with many legal powers. The Constitution has also been amended, as required by the Constitutional Council, to allow EU citizens to participate in municipal elections and the monetary union. EU treaties and EU law enacted under the treaties are considered international treaties, and the Constitution gives them superior status compared to domestic legislation. Ordinary civil and administrative courts, not the Constitutional Council, determine the compatibility of French law with EU law.

French courts consider the French Constitution itself to be superior to international treaties, including EU treaties and EU law. This is in contrast to EU institutions, which sees EU law as superior to the laws of member states. However, the Constitutional Council would only examine statutes implementing EU directives where it was manifestly contrary to French constitutional principles.

The European Union adopts laws on the basis of EU treaties. The Treaties establish the EU's institutions, list their powers and responsibilities, and explain the areas in which the EU can legislate with Directives or Regulations. European Union laws are a body of rules which are transposed either automatically (in the case of a regulation) or by national legislation (in the case of a directive) into French domestic law, whether in civil, criminal, administrative or constitutional law. The Court of Justice of the European Union (CJEU) is the main judicial body of EU laws. The EU's view is that if EU law conflicts with a provision of national law, then EU law has primacy; the view has been gradually accepted by French courts.

== Judicial institutions ==
=== French judicial system ===
French courts go by a number of names, including juridiction, tribunal, and cour. The Constitutional Council and Council of State are nominally councils but de facto courts. French courts are often specialized, with separate public law and private law courts, and subject matter specific courts like general civil and criminal courts, employment, commercial and agricultural lease courts. Judges are typically professional civil servants, mostly recruited through exams and trained at the École Nationale de la Magistrature. There are also non-professional judges, typically in less serious civil or administrative cases.

In public law cases, a public body, such as the national government, local authorities, public agencies, and public services like universities to railways, are always a party in dispute. Public bodies are subject to different rules on their power, contract, employment and liabilities. Instead of rules in the Civil Code and Commercial Code, administrative law statutes and principles developed by the Council of State are applied. Private law disputes between individuals or private entities are heard in civil courts. The Tribunal des conflits resolves questions of appropriate court jurisdiction.

=== Administrative law courts ===
The Council of State (Conseil d’État) is the highest court in administrative law and also the legal advisor of the executive branch. It originated from the King’s Privy Council, which adjudicated disputes with the state, which is exempt from other courts because of sovereign immunity. The Council of State hears appeals on questions of law from lower courts and gives advisory opinions on the law on reference from lower courts. It also decides at first instance the validity of legislative or administrative decisions of the President, the Prime Minister, and certain senior civil servants.

There are 42 lower administrative courts and 8 administrative courts of appeal, which hears appeals on fact and law. Administrative courts can enforce their decisions by ordonnance to the public body. In addition to generalist administrative courts, there are special administrative courts on asylum, social welfare payments, the disciplinary organs of professional bodies, and courts that audit public bodies and local governments. Administrative court judges are selected separately from other judges.

=== Civil and criminal courts ===
The Court of Cassation (Cour de cassation) is the highest court and the only national court on civil and criminal matters. It has six chambers, five civil chambers: (i) on contract, (ii) on delict, (iii) on family matters, (iv) on commercial matters, (v) on social matters: labour and social security law; and (vi) on criminal law. The court has 85 conseillers, 39 junior conseillers réferendaires, and 18 trainee auditeurs. It typically hears cases in three or five judge panels. A chambre mixte (a large panel of senior judges) or plenary session (Assemblée plénière) can convoke to resolve conflicts or hear important cases. In 2005, it decided over 26,000 cases. The Court of Cassation also gives advisory opinions on the law on reference from lower courts.

At the appellate level, there are 36 Courts of Appeal (cour d’appel), with jurisdiction on appeals in civil and criminal matters. A Court of Appeal will usually have specialist chambers on civil, social, criminal, and juvenile matters. The cour d’appel deals with questions of fact and law based on files from lower courts, and has the power to order additional investigations.

As for courts of first instance, there are 164 tribunaux de grande instance (civil courts for large claims, family matters, nationality, property and patents) and 307 tribunaux d’instance (civil courts for medium-sized claims). Separate commercial courts deal with commercial matters at the first instance, with lay judges elected by the local chamber of commerce. For criminal matters, the tribunal de police, the juges de proximité, the tribunal correctionnel and the cour d’assises hear criminal cases, depending on their seriousness. The cour d’assises is a branch of the Court of Appeal, which hears at first instance the most serious criminal cases. In criminal trials heard by the cour d’assises, three judges and nine jurors together determine the verdict and sentencing. Criminal and civil courts are connected and typically co-located, despite criminal law being a branch of public law.

=== Constitutional Council ===
The Constitutional Council (Conseil constitutionnel) was created in 1958 with exclusive authority to judge the constitutionality of parliamentary statutes. The President may refer a bill in Parliament to the Constitutional Council for constitutional review. The Prime Minister, the presidents of both houses of Parliament, and a group of 60 members from either of the two houses may also refer bills or treaties to the Constitutional Council. In addition, under Art. 61–1 of the Constitution, beginning in 2008, when individuals allege that their constitutional rights are infringed by legislation in a court proceeding, the Court of Cassation or the Council of State may refer the matter to the Constitutional Council for a preliminary ruling on its constitutionality. The Constitutional Council has nine members: three are appointed by the President, three by the head of the National Assembly, and three by the head of the Senate. Members of the Constitutional Council do not necessarily have legal or judicial training; former French Presidents who retired from politics are eligible to join the Constitutional Council if they wish.

=== Lawyers ===
Lawyers (avocats) are licensed via two routes in France. The most common one is the educational route via a licence de droit and a Master 1 in law, followed by the bar exam and 18 months of training at a bar school (one of fifteen Écoles d'avocats, EDAs). The second, less common route is the professional route. Candidates that hold specific diplomas can join an EDA without sitting the entrance examination (for example, PhD students), or qualify as a lawyer by directly sitting the final exam.

== See also ==
- Legal systems of the world
- 1825 Anti-Sacrilege Act
- Jules Ferry laws
- Lois scélérates
- La regle de non-cumul, which regulates action under contract law versus tort law
- General principles of French law
