= Henderson v Merrett Syndicates Ltd =

1994 British House of Lords case

- Court: House of Lords
- Decided: 25 July 1994
- Citation: [1995] 2 AC 145, [1994] UKHL 5, [1994] 3 All ER 506, [1994] UKHL 5

Court membership
- Judges sitting: Lord Keith of Kinkel, Lord Goff of Chieveley, Lord Browne-Wilkinson, Lord Mustill, Lord Nolan

Keywords
- negligence, assumption of responsibility, concurrent liability

Henderson v Merrett Syndicates Ltd [1994] UKHL 5 was a landmark House of Lords case. It established the possibility of concurrent liability in both tort and contract.

== Facts ==
Lloyd's of London, an insurance market, is organised in syndicates - groups who share the business, risk, and reward, of underwriting insurance policies and similar projects. The syndicate acts as a market which offers insurance on the one hand and investment opportunity on the other. The active business of a syndicate is run by underwriting agents. The liability of an investor (known as a "name") is unlimited - names share the profits but are also exposed to unlimited liability in the event of losses.

In the present case, hurricanes in United States had led to unprecedented losses for insurers. After the hurricanes, Lloyd's called upon the investors to cover their share of these losses. Litigation followed in which the names sued the people running the underwriting agents for negligent management of the investment fund. Mr Henderson was one of the names and Merrett Syndicates Ltd was one of the underwriting agents.

It was accepted that the underwriting agents had a duty to exercise due care and skill (see for instance, s 13 Supply of Goods and Services Act 1982). The question was whether the agents could be liable to the indirect investors (the names behind in the syndicate which had formed another syndicate). The problem was that there was a contractual relationship between the head syndicate managers and its direct members, but not necessarily a contractual relationship between the head syndicate managers and the members of the sub-syndicate. This led to the question of whether a duty could arise in tort, raising the matter of "assumption of responsibility"..

== Judgment ==
It was held that Merrett Syndicates was liable to both types of shareholders, as there was enough foreseeability to extend pure economic loss liability to "un-proximate" third parties. The major significance here was, however, the allowance of claims in both contract and tort, which blurred the divide between the two. Some of the first party Names claimed in tort to overcome the less favourable rules regarding the limitation period applicable to contract. In allowing such an action, the House of Lords expressly overruled Lord Scarman's ruling in Tai Hing Cotton Mill Ltd v Liu Chong Hing Bank Ltd [1986], in which it was held that: "there is nothing advantageous to the law's development in searching for a liability in tort where the parties are in a contractual relationship." The allowance of concurrent actions was immensely controversial, as it ran contrary to legal orthodoxy.

Lord Goff said the following.

So far as Hedley Byrne itself is concerned Mr. Kaye reads the speeches as restricting the principle of assumption of responsibility there established to cases where there is no contract; indeed, on this he tolerates no dissent, stating (at p. 706) that "unless one reads Hedley Byrne with deliberate intent to find obscure or ambiguous passages" it will not bear the interpretation favoured by Oliver J. I must confess however that, having studied yet again the speeches in Hedley Byrne [1964] A.C. 465 in the light of Mr. Kaye's critique, I remain of the opinion that Oliver J.'s reading of them is justified. It is, I suspect, a matter of the angle of vision with which they are read. For here, I consider, Oliver J. was influenced not only by what he read in the speeches themselves, notably the passage from Lord Devlin's speech at pp. 528-529 (quoted above), but also by the internal logic reflected in that passage, which led inexorably to the conclusion which he drew. Mr. Kaye's approach involves regarding the law of tort as supplementary to the law of contract, i.e. as providing for a tortious liability in cases where there is no contract. Yet the law of tort is the general law, out of which the parties can, if they wish, contract: and, as Oliver J. demonstrated, the same assumption of responsibility may, and frequently does, occur in a contractual context. Approached as a matter of principle, therefore, it is right to attribute to that assumption of responsibility, together with its concomitant reliance, a tortious liability, and then to enquire whether or not that liability is excluded by the contract because the latter is inconsistent with it. This is the reasoning which Oliver J., as I understand it, found implicit, where not explicit, in the speeches in Hedley Byrne. With his conclusion I respectfully agree. But even if I am wrong in this, I am of the opinion that this House should now, if necessary, develop the principle of assumption of responsibility as stated in Hedley Byrne to its logical conclusion so as to make it clear that a tortious duty of care may arise not only in cases where the relevant services are rendered gratuitously, but also where they are rendered under a contract. This indeed is the view expressed by my noble and learned friend Lord Keith of Kinkel in Murphy v Brentwood District Council [1991] 1 AC 398, 466, in a speech with which all the other members or the Appellate Committee agreed.

== See also ==
- Caparo Industries plc v Dickman
- La règle de non-cumul in French law
