= New French Civil Procedure Code =

The French New Code of Civil Procedure is the name used to refer to the Code gathering all laws related to civil procedure in France between 1975 and 2007. It is now simply referred to as the Civil Procedure Code.

== Adoption ==
The New Civil Procedure Code formally replaced the former Napoleonic Code of Civil Procedure of 1807 in accordance with Article 26 of the 20 December 2007 Legal Simplification Act (n 2007-1787). The Napoleonic Civil Procedure Code had already undergone drastic changes since 1973, with the adoption of the Decree n 75-1123 and other legislative changes adopted in 2005. Changes introduced in the civil procedure legislation between 1973 and 2007 referred to the 'New' Civil Procedure Code as, despite the reforms, the old Napoleonic Civil Procedure Code still applied for parts and had not been officially abrogated. Since 2007 and the repealing of the Napoleonic Code, the current Civil Procedure Code is simply referred to as 'the Civil Procedure Code'.
