= Re Harris Simons Construction Ltd =

- Court: High Court
- Citation: [1989] 1 WLR 368

Case opinions
- Hoffmann J

Keywords
- Administration

Re Harris Simons Construction Ltd [1989] 1 WLR 368 is a UK insolvency law case concerning the administration procedure when a company is unable to repay its debts.

== Facts ==
Harris Simons Construction Ltd was a building company. From April 1985 to 1988 its turnover increased from £830,000 to £27 million. It all came from one client called Berkley House plc. They had a close relationship but it went sour, and Berkley purported to dismiss them. It withheld several million pounds in payments. Harris Simons could not pay debts as they fell due or carry on trading. The report of the proposed administrator said it would be very difficult to sell any part of the business. Berkley said if an administration order were made it would give enough funding to let the company complete four contracts on condition it remove itself from the sites that were in dispute. The company therefore proposed an administration order under the Insolvency Act 1986, section 8(3) (now Insolvency Act 1986, Schedule B1, para 12(1)(a)). The question was whether the court should exercise its jurisdiction and whether the order would be likely to achieve the specified purposes of administration (now found in the Insolvency Act 1986, Schedule B1, para 3).

== Judgment ==
Hoffmann J held that an administration order should be made because there was a reasonable possibility that a purpose of administration, i.e. saving the company or business, would be achieved. This could also be termed as a "real prospect", or a "good arguable case". It did not need to be satisfied that the administration would succeed on the "balance of probabilities", although there needed to be a greater prospect of success than just a "mere possibility". His judgment went as follows.

Section 8(1) gives the court jurisdiction to make an administration order if it “(a) is satisfied that a company is or is likely to become unable to pay its debts” and it “(b) considers that the making of an order… would be likely to achieve” one or more of the purposes specified in section 8(3) [see now Insolvency Act 1986, Schedule B1, paras 11 and 3]. I am satisfied on the evidence that the company is unable to pay its debts. Whether the order would be likely to achieve one of the specified objects is not so easy to answer. When the statute says that I must consider it likely, what degree of probability does this involve? In In re Consumer and Industrial Press Ltd [1988] BCLC 177, 178, Peter Gibson J. said:

“As I read section 8 the court must be satisfied on the evidence put before it that at least one of the purposes in section 8(3) is likely to be achieved if it is to make an administration order. That does not mean that it is merely possible that such purpose will be achieved; the evidence must go further than that to enable the court to hold that the purpose in question will more probably than not be achieved.”

He therefore required that on a scale of probability of 0 (impossibility) to 1 (absolute certainty) the likelihood of success should be more than 0.5. I naturally hesitate to disagree with Peter Gibson J., particularly since he had the benefit of adversarial argument. But this is a new statute on which the judges of the Companies Court are still feeling their way to a settled practice and I therefore think I should say that in my view he set the standard of probability too high. My reasons are as follows. First, “likely” connotes probability but the particular degree of probability intended must be gathered from qualifying words (very likely, quite likely, more likely than not) or context. It cannot be a misuse of language to say that something is likely without intending to suggest that the probability of its happening exceeds 0.5, as in “I think that the favourite, Golden Spurs at 5–1, is likely to win the Derby.” Secondly, the section requires the court to be “satisfied” of the company's actual or likely insolvency but only to “consider” that the order would be likely to achieve one of the stated purposes. There must have been a reason for this change of language and I think it was to indicate that a lower threshold of persuasion was needed in the latter case than the former. The first of the sentences I have quoted from the judgment of Peter Gibson J. suggests that he did not take this variation into account. Thirdly, some of the stated purposes are mutually exclusive and the probability of any one of them being achieved may be less than 0.5 but the probability of one or other of them being achieved may be more than 0.5. I doubt whether Parliament intended the courts to embark on such calculations of cumulative probabilities. Fourthly, as Peter Gibson J. said, section 8(1) only sets out the conditions to be satisfied before the court has jurisdiction. It still retains a discretion as to whether or not to make the order. It is therefore not unlikely that the legislature intended to set a modest threshold of probability to found jurisdiction and to rely on the court's discretion not to make orders in cases in which, weighing all the circumstances, it seemed inappropriate to do so. Fifthly, the Report of the Review Committee on Insolvency Law and Practice (1982), (Cmnd. 8558), para. 508, which recommended *371 the introduction of administratorship, said that the new procedure was likely to be beneficial

“only in cases where there is a business of sufficient substance to justify the expense of an administration, and where there is a real prospect of returning to profitability or selling as a going concern.”

Elsewhere the report speaks of an order being made if there is a “reasonable possibility” of a scheme of reconstruction. I think that this kind of phraseology was intended to be reflected in the statutory phrase “considers that [it] would be likely” in section 8(1)(b).

For my part, therefore, I would hold that the requirements of section 8(1)(b) are satisfied if the court considers that there is a real prospect that one or more of the stated purposes may be achieved. It may be said that phrases like “real prospect” lack precision compared with 0.5 on the scale of probability. But the courts are used to dealing in other contexts with such indications of the degree of persuasion they must feel. “Prima facie case” and “good arguable case” are well known examples. Such phrases are like tempo markings in music; although there is inevitably a degree of subjectivity in the way they are interpreted, they are nevertheless meaningful and useful.

On the facts as they appear from the evidence before me, I think there is a real prospect that an administration order, coupled with the agreement with Berkley House, will enable the whole or part of the company's undertaking to survive or at least enable the administrator to effect a more advantageous realisation of the assets than would be effected in a winding up. Certainly the prospects for the company, its employees and creditors look bleak if no administration order is made and there has to be a winding up. Consequently, although I cannot say that it is more probable than not that one of the specified purposes will be achieved, I accept the opinion of the prospective administrator that “the making of an administration order offers the best prospect for preserving the company's future and maximising the realisation of the company's assets for the benefit of its creditors.” I therefore made the order.

== See also ==
- UK insolvency law
