= Boyo v London Borough of Lambeth =

- Court: Court of Appeal
- Citation: [1994] ICR 727

Court membership
- Judges sitting: Ralph Gibson LJ, Staughton LJ

Keywords
- Wrongful dismissal

Boyo v London Borough of Lambeth [1994] ICR 727 is a UK labour law case, concerning wrongful dismissal.

== Facts ==
Mr Boyo was an accountant for Lambeth London Borough Council until suspended and dismissed as the police charged him with fraud. His contract said he would only be dismissed after an investigation and consideration of allegations of gross misconduct, but the council did nothing because it did not want to interfere with the police investigation or prosecution. It initially claimed frustration but then admitted wrongful dismissal.

First instance awarded six months' wages, for one month notice and a five month disciplinary. Mr Boyo claimed damages for salary loss up to trial date, when he accepted the repudiatory breach of contract.

== Judgment ==
The Court of Appeal held that while the employer did not unilaterally terminate the contract, the employer was liable to pay compensation up to the time when it could lawfully unilaterally terminate. This meant the time for giving proper notice plus disciplinary time.

Ralph Gibson LJ said he was bound to follow Gunton in that an employer's repudiatory breach would only terminate the contract when accepted by the employee, but preferred a partial survival theory.

Staughton LJ said that an employment contract is ‘in a class of its own’ because neither an employee nor an employer should be compelled to work together.

Sir Francis Purchas concurred.

== See also ==
- UK labour law
