= Peter Millett, Baron Millett =

British judge (1932–2021)

The Right Honourable The Lord Millett GBS PC

Lord of Appeal in Ordinary
- In office 1 October 1998 – 11 January 2004
- Monarch: Elizabeth II
- Preceded by: The Lord Nolan
- Succeeded by: The Baroness Hale of Richmond

Member of the House of Lords
- Lord Temporal
- Lord of Appeal in Ordinary; 1 October 1998 – 4 May 2017

Non-Permanent Judge of the Court of Final Appeal of Hong Kong
- In office 28 July 2000 – 27 May 2021
- Appointed by: Tung Chee-hwa

Personal details
- Born: Peter Julian Millett; 23 June 1932 London, England
- Died: 27 May 2021 (aged 88) London, England
- Spouse: Ann Mireille Harris (m. 1959)
- Children: 3
- Occupation: Judge
- Profession: Barrister

Chinese name
- Chinese: 苗禮治
Transcriptions
Yue: Cantonese
- Yale Romanization: Mìuh Láih Jih
- Jyutping: Miu^{4} Lai^{5} Zi^{6}

Peter Julian Millett, Baron Millett, GBS, PC (23 June 1932 – 27 May 2021) was a British barrister and judge. He was a Lord of Appeal in Ordinary from 1998 to 2004.

== Biography ==
=== Early life ===
Millett was born in Hampstead, London, on 23 June 1932, to Isaac Moses "Denis" Millett and Adele Yetta Weinberg, both Jews of Polish descent. The Millett family (also spelt Millet) emigrated from Dąbrowa Tarnowska and set up several businesses. His father was prominent in Liberal Party politics in Leicestershire, and with his cousin Michael founded Millets Stores in 1928 in Leicester. His mother was a junior tennis champion from Ormskirk, Lancashire.

Millett was educated at Harrow School, London, and at Trinity Hall, Cambridge, where he received a Master of Arts in Classics and Law in 1954, graduating with a double first. From 1955 to 1957 he served as a Flying Officer in the Royal Air Force. He was awarded an honorary fellowship by Queen Mary, University of London in 2012.

=== Legal career ===
Millett was called to the bar at Middle Temple in 1955. In 1959, he joined Lincoln's Inn, where he was appointed a bencher in 1980. From 1958 to 1986 he practised at the Chancery Bar and was examiner and lecturer in practical conveyancing at the Council of Legal Education from 1962 to 1976. Between 1967 and 1973, Millett was junior counsel at the Department of Trade and Industry in chancery matters, and between 1971 and 1975 member of the General Council of the Bar.

He was a member of the Law Commission working party on co-ownership of the matrimonial home in 1972 and 1973 and appointed a Queen's Counsel in the following year. From 1977 to 1982, Millett was member of the Department of Trade Insolvency Law Review Committee. In 1982 he acted for the Inland Revenue in the leading tax avoidance case, Ramsay v IRC, creating a principle that ended and prevented many tax avoidance schemes.

=== Judicial career ===
In 1986, he became a judge of the High Court of Justice and was knighted. He was appointed a Lord Justice of Appeal and a member of the Privy Council in 1994. On 1 October 1998, he was appointed a Lord of Appeal in Ordinary, receiving additionally a life peerage with the title Baron Millett, of St Marylebone in the City of Westminster. He retired as a Lord of Appeal in Ordinary in January 2004.

He was a Non-permanent Judge of the Hong Kong Court of Final Appeal between 2000 and 2021. In 2015, Millett was awarded the Gold Bauhinia Star by the Chief Executive of Hong Kong.

He retired from the membership of the House of Lords on 4 May 2017.

=== Personal life ===
Millett was married to Ann Mireille Harris from 1959. They had three sons, one of whom died in infancy.

From 1991 to 1995, he was President of the West London Synagogue.

He was an active Freemason, and served for five years as Metropolitan Grand Master of London from the inception of the new Metropolitan Grand Lodge in 2003. In this capacity he supervised more than 1,200 Masonic Lodges in London, and more than 600 associated Chapters of Royal Arch Masons.

Millett died from hereditary transthyretin amyloidosis at his home in Westminster, London, on 27 May 2021.

== Judgments ==
Millett was well known for his judgment in the House of Lords in the wrongful birth case of McFarlane v Tayside Health Board where a couple were denied recovery of damages for the cost of bringing up an unwanted child, born as a result of a negligently performed vasectomy. He concluded that "the law must take the birth of a normal, healthy baby to be a blessing, not a detriment." In addition, in a dissenting opinion, he concluded that damages could not be awarded for the pain and distress of pregnancy and delivery but rather that a small sum should be awarded to reflect that the parents had "lost the freedom to limit the size of their family" and thus had been "denied an important aspect of their personal autonomy."

Millett was also notable for his contribution to the law of equity and trusts. He wrote the leading judgment in Foskett v McKeown, a landmark case on the English law of trusts, concerning tracing and the availability of proprietary relief following a breach of trust. He also decided Bristol and West Building Society v Mothew, a leading English fiduciary law and professional negligence case, concerning a solicitor's duty of care and skill, and the nature of fiduciary duties. The case is globally cited for its definition of a fiduciary and the circumstances in which a fiduciary relationship arises.

=== List of judgments by Lord Millett ===
- Re Charnley Davies Ltd [1990] BCLC 760
- Armitage v Nurse [1997] EWCA Civ 1279
- Bristol and West Building Society v Mothew [1998] Ch 1
- Foskett v McKeown [2000] UKHL 29, [2001] 1 AC 102
- Re Brumark Investments Ltd [2001] UKPC 28
- Twinsectra Ltd v Yardley [2002] UKHL 12
- Shogun Finance Ltd v Hudson [2004] 1 AC 919
- Collector of Stamp Revenue v Arrowtown Assets Ltd [2003] HKCFA 52, [2004] 1 HKLRD 77, (2003) 6 HKCFAR 517, FACV 4/2003
- Re Cosslett (Contractors) Ltd [1998] Ch 495 (CA)

== Arms ==
Coat of arms of Peter Millett, Baron Millett
| Crest On a millrind fesswise an eagle displayed Sable armed and legged Gules and breathing flames Proper. Escutcheon Per pale Sable and Argent a crescent per pale Ermine and Ermines interlaced with two arrows in saltire heads downwards per pale Argent and Sable within eight billets in orle counterchanged. Motto The Greek for, ‘Know Thyself.’. |

== Sources ==
- "DodOnline". Archived from the original on 11 December 2006.
