= Case stated =

Legal procedure

In law, a case stated is a procedure by which a court or tribunal can ask another court for its opinion on a point of law. There are two kinds: consultative case stated and appeal by way of case stated. A consultative case stated is made at the discretion of a judge before he or she determines the case before the court. An appeal by way of case stated is made at the request of a party to the proceedings to the judge after the conclusion of a case.

On the hearing of a case stated, the higher court is restricted to consideration of the law alone and is required to accept the statement of facts submitted to it by the lower court.

If the application is granted, the matter is referred to the higher court. This usually takes the form "were we/was I correct to …" and then the specified aspect of law to which the appeal relates. If the application to state a case is refused, the applicant may be able to seek redress by judicial review. The higher court will determine whether or not the law was correctly applied. If the appeal is upheld, the higher court will refer the case back to the referring court with directions to correct its decision. Otherwise, the appeal would be dismissed.

== In England and Wales ==
In criminal cases in England and Wales, appeal by way of case stated allows both defendants and prosecutors in cases before the magistrates' court to appeal decisions if they are "wrong in law" or "in excess of jurisdiction". Such appeals go to a Divisional Court of the King's Bench Division of the High Court of Justice.

== See also ==
- Certified question, a similar process to consultative case stated in American law.
- Preliminary reference, a similar procedure in which courts and tribunals in member states of the European Union may make questions of law to the European Court of Justice for determination.
