= Professional negligence in English law =

In the English law of tort, professional negligence is a subset of the general rules on negligence to cover the situation in which the defendant has represented him or herself as having more than average skills and abilities. The usual rules rely on establishing that a duty of care is owed by the defendant to the claimant, and that the defendant is in breach of that duty. The standard test of breach is whether the defendant has matched the abilities of a reasonable person. But, by virtue of the services they offer and supply, professional people hold themselves out as having more than average abilities. This specialised set of rules determines the standards against which to measure the legal quality of the services actually delivered by those who claim to be among the best in their fields of expertise.

== Sources of legal liability for professionals ==
Liability of provider of professional services towards their client (and potentially third parties) can arise on a number of different legal bases, including contract, negligence, other torts, equity (such as duties owed by trustees and fiduciaries), as well as statutory rules such as the Consumer Rights Act 2015 and the Supply of Goods and Services Act 1982 (which applies in non-consumer contexts). In addition, professionals also have regulatory obligations, rules requiring professional indemnity insurance, as well as the possibility of being prosecuted under the criminal law (particularly, in a medical context, for gross negligence manslaughter).

The substantive and procedural differences between the different types of liability can be of practical importance to parties due to the choice of remedies available, different limitation periods, and whether or not liability extends towards third parties.

If a patient seeks publicly funded medical assistance (through the National Health Service, for instance), no contractual obligation may exist, but a duty in tort does. By contrast, a person seeing a doctor privately may be able to recover through both contract and tort concurrently—a principle affirmed by the House of Lords in 1995 in Henderson v Merrett Syndicates Ltd. When the person paying a professional differs from the person to whom the professional is providing services, the duties owed to the different parties can diverge and are often very fact-specific.

=== The relationship between contract and tort ===
In principle, the tortious liability runs in parallel to liability in contract. Subject to the rules of privity of contract, one who has entered into a contract can sue or be sued on the contract which will set out the terms of the service to be provided by the professional person, and if there is no express term to this effect, there will be an implied term that the service will be performed with reasonable care and skill, per s 49(1) Consumer Rights Act 2015. The standard of care required to satisfy this contractual obligation is the same as in negligence, but the circumstances in which each liability may arise differ in that contracts are voluntarily created between the parties, while the duty of care is imposed by operation of law. However, suppose that a solicitor contracts with a medical expert to prepare a report for the purposes of personal injury litigation. The beneficiary of this work will be the client but there is no direct contractual relationship between the expert and the client. It may therefore be argued that since the parties have decided to arrange their relationships to avoid direct contractual obligations, the client should not be permitted to sue in tort, bypassing the privity rule and any exclusion clauses in the contract.

In Henderson v Merrett Syndicates Ltd, the potential effectiveness of this argument was acknowledged in a case where there was a formalised structure of agent and sub-agent, but the general scope of this potential limitation remains unclear. However, it is clear that if there is concurrent liability in contract and tort, the quantum of damages is limited to the actual loss suffered and does not increase because there are two causes of action.

In Thake v Maurice, a railway guard and his wife had five children living in a three-bedroomed council house and were unwilling to have further children. Thake consulted the surgeon who made it clear that a vasectomy was final and that Thake after the operation would become permanently sterile. Although the vasectomy was properly performed, the effect of this operation was naturally reversed and, not unexpectedly, Mrs. Thake conceived and a daughter was born. It was held that, applying the objective standard, the surgeon had contracted not merely to perform a vasectomy but had contracted to make Mr. Thake irreversibly sterile. The judge relied on the consent forms which stated that the vasectomy would be final. The claim was brought in contract and in tort. Peter Pain J found that there was no reason why public policy prevented the recovery of expenses arising from the birth of a healthy child. He awarded damages in respect of the expenses of the birth and the mother's loss of wages but refused damages for the pain and distress of labour holding that these were off set by the joy occasioned by the birth. He did, however, award damages in an agreed sum for the child's upkeep to its seventeenth birthday. The Court of Appeal held that damages should be awarded for pain and suffering "per the majority" in tort rather than contract. The joy of having the child could be set off against the time, trouble and care in the upbringing of the child but not against prenatal pain and distress. For the latter, damages should be awarded. The case is also interesting because there was an alternative interpretation of the consent form. After sterilisation, some couples want to change their minds because their children have died or because they are seeing better days. Instead of the surgeon giving a guarantee of irreversible sterility which depended on the way in which human tissue healed, the warning of finality could be aimed at telling both husband and wife that they could not change their mind later and complain if the spouse had become permanently sterile.

== Discussion ==
Even though the general objective standard of care cannot come down, it can be raised where the individual defendant has expressly or impliedly represented skills and abilities in excess of the ordinary person. It is an unfortunate fact of life that some professionals prove to be negligent because even those with the most experience can make a mistake. The consequences to their clients can be disastrous. Thus, professionals providing services in a wide range of situations, from surveyors and estate agents to doctors, architects, solicitors, accountants, engineers, financial services providers, Information Technology professionals, patent agents, etc., will be judged by the standards of those claiming to have that same set of skills and abilities. This is the basis of the "Bolam test" for medical negligence derived from Bolam v Friern Hospital Management Committee. This test is not significantly different from the test used in any other professional negligence litigation, but it causes greater difficulty for the courts than would a claim against, say, a lawyer or an accountant, because of the technical issues involved. In addition, Hedley Byrne & Co Ltd v Heller & Partners Ltd created the rule of "reasonable reliance" by the claimant on the skills of the defendant.

"Where a person is so placed that others could reasonably rely upon his judgment or his skill or upon his ability to make careful inquiry, and a person takes it upon himself to give information or advice to, or allows his information or advice to be passed on to, another person who, as he knows or should know, will place reliance upon it, then a duty of care will arise."

Cases of professional liability blur the distinction between acts and statements, e.g. a medical specialist prepares a report for personal injury litigation, which can be characterised as a statement, but it must be based on the prior acts of carrying out a review of the medical records and performing a physical examination of the client. Actions nominally based on Hedley Byrne by definition include negligent acts or omissions, even though the ratio decidendi of Hedley Byrne was cast in terms of liability for statements. In Caparo Industries plc. v Dickman, the criteria for a duty of care in giving advice were stated in more restricted terms:

"What can be deduced from the Hedley Byrne case, therefore, is that the necessary relationship between the maker of a statement or giver of advice (the adviser) and the recipient who acts in reliance on it (the advisee) may typically be held to exist where (1) the advice is required for a purpose, whether particularly specified or generally described, which is made known, either actually or inferentially, to the adviser at the time when the advice is given, (2) the adviser knows, either actually or inferentially, that his advice will be communicated to the advisee, either specifically or as a member of an ascertainable class, in order that it should be used by the advisee for that purpose, (3) it is known, either actually or inferentially, that the advice so communicated is likely to be acted on by the advisee for that purpose without independent inquiry and (4) it is so acted on by the advisee to his detriment."

Following Caparo, the Court of Appeal in James McNaughton Papers Group Ltd. v Hicks Anderson & Co. [1991] 1 All ER 134 adopted a more restricted approach, focusing in the adviser's actual and constructive knowledge of the purpose for which the statement was made. Thus, the duty was to be limited to transactions or types of transactions where the adviser knew or ought to have known that the advisee would rely on the statement in connection with that transaction without obtaining independent advice. It also had to be shown that the advisee did in fact reasonably rely on the statement without using his own judgment or obtaining independent advice. In Henderson v Merrett Syndicates Ltd. the Lords reasserted the underlying principle that liability under Hedley Byrne was a voluntary assumption of responsibility for performing the given task by a person rendering professional or quasi-professional services irrespective of whether there was a contractual relationship between the pages.

== Medical negligence ==
Medical negligence (also known as medical malpractice) differs from other litigation because the claimant must rely on expert medical evidence to establish all the major elements of liability. Causation is particularly difficult to prove because the effects of the allegedly negligent treatment must be distinguished from those of the patient's underlying condition which gave rise to the need for treatment. Further, the assessment of damages is often complicated because the court must compare the claimant's actual condition and prognosis with the hypothetical condition and prognosis if the patient had received competent medical treatment. The court must only compensate for the injuries caused by negligent treatment, not for any underlying condition. In Bolam, McNair J stated at 587, that the defendant had to have acted in accordance with the practice accepted as proper by a "responsible body of medical men." Later, at 588, he referred to "a standard of practice recognised as proper by a competent reasonable body of opinion." To determine whether a body of opinion is responsible, reasonable or respectable, the judge will need to be satisfied that, in forming their views, the experts have directed their minds to the question of comparative risks and benefits and have reached a defensible conclusion on the matter. For example, in Hucks v Cole reported in (1993) 4 Med. L.R. 393, a doctor failed to treat a patient who was suffering from septic places on her skin with penicillin even though he knew there was a risk of puerperal fever. Sachs LJ said at 397:

"When the evidence shows that a lacuna in professional practice exists by which risks of grave danger are knowingly taken, then, however small the risk, the court must anxiously examine that lacuna—particularly if the risk can be easily and inexpensively avoided. If the court finds, on an analysis of the reasons given for not taking those precautions that, in the light of current professional knowledge, there is no proper basis for the lacuna, and that it is definitely not reasonable that those risks should have been taken, its function is to state that fact and where necessary to state that it constitutes negligence. In such a case the practice will no doubt thereafter be altered to the benefit of patients."

Similarly, in Edward Wong Finance Co. Ltd. v Johnson Stokes & Master (1984) 1 AC 296, solicitors had completed a mortgage transaction in "Hong Kong style" rather than in the English style. The fact that this style was almost universally adopted in Hong Kong did not make it reasonable or responsible because it did not guard against the risk of fraud. Thus, the solicitors were liable for negligence because they should have taken precautions against an obvious risk. But, the Lords in Bolitho v City and Hackney Health Authority (1997) 4 AER 771 held that it will very seldom be right for a judge to reach the conclusion that views genuinely held by a competent medical expert are unreasonable.

== Legal negligence ==
=== Solicitors ===
As to solicitors, Ross v Caunters [1979] 3 AER 580, holds that lawyers can owe a duty of care both to their clients and to third parties who suffer loss or damage. In that case, the solicitors failed to prevent a beneficiary from attesting the will. They admitted negligence but denied that they were liable to the claimant, contending (i) that a solicitor was liable only to his client and then only in contract and not in tort and could not, therefore, be liable in tort to a third party, (ii) that for reasons of policy, a solicitor ought not to be liable in negligence to anyone except his client, and (iii) that in any event, the plaintiff had no cause of action in negligence because the damage suffered was purely financial.

Applying the principles in Hedley Byrne & Co Ltd v Heller & Partners Ltd and Donoghue v Stevenson, a solicitor who is instructed by a client to carry out a transaction that will confer a benefit on a third party owes a duty of care towards the third party in carrying out that transaction, in that the third party is a person within his direct contemplation as someone who is likely to be so closely and directly affected by his acts or omissions that he can reasonably foresee that the third party is likely to be injured by those acts or omissions. This was confirmed in White v Jones [1995] 1 AER 691 which applied Caparo Industries plc v Dickman [1990] 1 AER 568 holding that there is a close and direct relationship characterised by the law as proximity or neighbourhood; and the situation is one where it is fair, just and reasonable that the law should impose the duty of the given scope upon the one party for the benefit of the other. But in Carr-Glynn v Frearsons [1997] 2 AER 614 the solicitor admitted uncertainty as to whether the will as drawn would be effective. The testatrix undertook to seek out the information needed to clarify the issue. She died more than three years later without verifying the will. White v Jones was distinguished because the testatrix had assumed the duty of care, but the court was critical of the failure of the solicitors to send a letter of reminder. The case law also indicates the necessity for firms of solicitors to keep detailed attendance notes.

Gran Gelato Ltd. v Richcliff (Group) Ltd. (1992) Ch 560 involved a solicitor's replies to preliminary enquiries in a conveyancing transaction. It was therefore foreseeable that others would rely on the answers given but the court held that there was no duty of care. A solicitor owes a professional duty of care to the client and no one else. He or she is subject to professional rules and standards, and owes duties to the court as one of its officers. Thus, in general, when acting for the seller of land a solicitor does not owe a duty to the buyer. Similarly, Al-Kandari v J.R. Brown & Co. (1988) QB 665 held that a solicitor acting for a party in adversarial litigation does not owe a duty of care to that party's opponent. This was a family case involving contested custody, where the husband had previously abducted the two children of the parties. Solicitors undertook to keep the husband's passport (which included the children's names) under their control. Bingham LJ said at 675:

"In the ordinary course of adversarial litigation a solicitor does not owe a duty of care to his client's adversary. The theory underlying such litigation is that justice is best done if each party, separately and independently advised, attempts within the limits of the law and propriety and good practice to achieve the best result for himself that he reasonably can without regard to the interests of the other party. The duty of the solicitor, within the same limits, is to assist his client in that endeavour, although the wise solicitor may often advise that the best result will involve an element of compromise or give and take or horse trading. Ordinarily, however, in contested civil litigation a solicitor's proper concern is to do what is best for his client without regard to the interests of his opponent."

Further, and perhaps most strikingly, it has been held that a solicitor advising a client about a proposed dealing with his property in his lifetime owes no duty of care to a prospective beneficiary under the client's then will who may be prejudicially affected. In Clarke v Bruce Lance & Co. (1988) 1 WLR 881, it was recognised that solicitors may sometimes give advice which directly prejudices the interests of others who have a relationship with the client. But, so long as this advice is consistent with the duty owed to the client, there will be no liability to that third party. Exceptionally, solicitors have been held to have assumed a responsibility towards the claimant, i.e. in situations analogous to a holding a fund on behalf of both sides of a dispute pending its resolution.

=== Barristers ===
In Hedley Byrne & Co Ltd v Heller & Partners Ltd the rule was established that irrespective of contract if someone who possesses a special skill undertakes to apply that skill for the assistance of another person who relies upon that skill, a duty of care will arise. The fact that the barrister did not enter into a contract with his solicitor or client ceased to be a ground of justification for the immunity. Nevertheless, in a unanimous decision, Lord Reid said in Rondel v Worsley (1969) 1 AC 191 at 227 that the ancient immunity should be continued on considerations of "public policy [which are] not immutable." (Roxburgh 1968) In Saif Ali v Sydney Smith Mitchell & Co. (1980) AC 198 the scope of the immunity was considered. Lord Wilberforce said at 213 that "...barristers . . . have a special status, just as a trial has a special character: some immunity is necessary in the public interest, even if, in some rare cases, an individual may suffer loss." (Hill 1986) When s51 Supreme Court Act 1981 (substituted by s4 Courts and Legal Services Act 1990) introduced the power to make wasted costs orders against legal practitioners, Ridehalgh v Horsefield (1994) Ch 205 ruled that orders could be made against barristers personally. As to criminal trials, prosecuting counsel owes no duty of care to a defendant: Elguzouli-Daf v Commissioner of Police of the Metropolis (1995) QB 335. If a defendant is convicted after a full and fair trial, the remedy is to appeal. An attempt to challenge the convictions by suing the defence advocate would be an abuse of process: Hunter v Chief Constable of the West Midlands Police (1982) AC 529. If any challenge is to be made following an unsuccessful appeal, the only legitimate avenue would be the Criminal Cases Review Commission even though the body is under-resourced. But the question remained as to whether a civil action might be maintained if the appeal was successful. (Cane 1996)

In Arthur J.S. Hall and Co. v Simons, the Law Lords re-evaluated the public policy issues. The critical factor was the duty of a barrister to the court under ss27(2A) and 28(2A) Courts and Legal Services Act 1990 (inserted by s42 Access to Justice Act 1999). The question was whether the immunity is needed to ensure that barristers will respect their duty to the court. In 1967, the answer was that assertions of negligence would tend to erode this duty and accorded a special status to barristers. Nowadays a comparison with other professionals demonstrated that barristers' immunity against being sued in negligence was anomalous. Allowing civil action was unlikely to produce a flood of claims and, even if some claims did emerge, a claimant alleging that poor advocacy resulted in an unfavourable outcome would face the very great difficulty of showing that a better standard of advocacy would have resulted in a more favourable outcome. Unmeritorious and vexatious claims against barristers are simply struck out. Thus, it was no longer in the public interest that the immunity in favour of barristers should remain in either civil or criminal cases. This did not imply that Rondel v Worsley was wrongly decided. But in today's world, that decision no longer correctly reflected public policy. The basis of the immunity of barristers has gone. And exactly the same reasoning is applied to solicitor advocates.

=== Witnesses ===
Since Watson v M’Ewan (1905) AC 480, English law has allowed a public policy immunity to any witness, including those who give evidence that is "false and injurious" or merely negligent. In Evans v London Hospital Medical College (1981) 1 WLR 184, Drake J. said that, in criminal proceedings, the immunity covered, "the statement ...made for the purpose of a possible action or prosecution and at a time when a possible action or prosecution is being considered." He also thought the immunity extended to, "...acts of witnesses in collecting or considering material on which he may be called to give evidence." In Stanton v Callaghan (1999) 2 WLR 745, Chadwick LJ said:

"It seems to me that the following propositions are supported by authority binding on this court: (1) an expert witness who gives evidence at trial is immune from suit in respect of anything which he says in court and that immunity will extend to the contents of the report which he adopts as, or incorporates in, his evidence; (2) where an expert witness gives evidence at a trial the immunity which he would enjoy in respect of that evidence is not to be circumnavigated by a suit based on the report itself and (3) the immunity does not extend to protect an expert who has been retained to advise as to the merits of a party’s claim in litigation from a suit by the party by whom he has been retained in respect of that advice, notwithstanding that it was in contemplation at the time when the advice was given that the expert would be a witness at the trial if that litigation were to proceed."

In Arthur J.S. Hall and Co. v Simons, Lord Hoffmann justified the policy in that without the immunity, witnesses "...would be more reluctant to assist the court". In Darker and others v Chief Constable of West Midlands Police [2000] 3 WLR 747, the claimant alleged that police officers had conspired with an informant to forge and manipulate records of evidence. Lord Clyde confirmed the immunity for the preparation of a report to be used in court. He said:

"In drawing the line in any particular case it may be necessary to study precisely what was being done and how closely it was linked with the proceedings in court... The reason for admitting to the benefit of the immunity things said or done without the walls of the court is to prevent any collateral attack on the witness and circumvent the immunity he or she may enjoy within the court."

This confirms the general principle that a witness does not owe a duty of care to anyone in respect of the evidence given to the court. The only duty is to tell the truth. In Part 35.3 Civil Procedure Rules, the expert’s duty is to help the court and this duty "overrides" any obligation there might be to the client or the person who instructs and/or pays him or her.

However, the position in respect of expert witnesses was altered by the decision of the Supreme Court in 2011 in Jones v Kaney, which overruled Stanton v Callaghan. As before, an expert will be liable to his client for advice which is tendered to and relied upon by the client under normal principles. However, as a result of the decision, an expert who provides a report which is adduced in evidence before a court no longer enjoys immunity from suit for claims for negligence or breach of contract (although immunity in defamation remains).

== See also ==
- Professional
- Professional abuse
- Professional ethics
- Professional responsibility
- Negligence (disambiguation)
