= John Doe law =

John Doe law may refer to the following:

- Fictitious defendants
- John Doe law (Wisconsin), a prosecution tool used in Wisconsin
