= Glossary of French criminal law =

This glossary of French criminal law is a list of explanations or translations of contemporary and historical concepts of criminal law in France.

== Introduction ==
=== Scope ===
This glossary includes terms from criminal law under the legal system in France. Legal terms from other countries that use French language (Belgium, Canada, Switzerland, North Africa, etc.) are not included here. Terms from the French civil code (known as the Napoleonic Code) and from French administrative law are generally not included, unless they have repercussions for criminal law. Some common expressions for governmental agencies, position titles, or other concepts are included for convenience even if they are not unique to criminal law, as they come up frequently in definitions of other terms.

=== Disclaimer ===
There is absolutely no assurance that any statement contained in this article is true, correct, or precise. The information in this article is, at best, of a general nature and cannot substitute for the advice of a competent authority with specialized knowledge.

=== Style ===
Each entry consists of a bolded headword containing one French expression, followed by an indented section with a translated equivalent or description of the term. Headwords appear as they would be if found in English running text; thus italicized, and in lower case unless always capitalized. Many of these terms can be found in French Wikipedia. Below the headword, the indented text may contain either a direct translation of the French term, a definition or description of it, or some combination. A section symbol (§) prefixed before a term indicates another term appearing on the page. Headwords are alphabetized as if they contained no embedded blanks; accented letters are alphabetized as if they were not accented; for example: à perpetuité comes after amende but before appel.

== Glossary ==
=== A ===
abrogation
repeal of an Act; revocation (of regulations, etc.)

abus
misuse; fraudulent misuse See also: § détournement.
Usage notes:
- abus d'autorité ⟶ abuse (misuse) of official authority. See § abus de pouvoir below.
- abus de biens sociaux ⟶ misuse of a company's property or credit
- abus de confiance ⟶ misappropriation, embezzlement (see also: § détourner); fraudulent conversion. In other contexts (civil law) ⟶ breach of trust.
- abus sexuel sur mineur ⟶ child sexual abuse
- abus de faiblesse : see also disability abuse.
- abus de pouvoir ⟶ abuse of power – exercise of a legal right only to cause annoyance, harm, or injury.
Other contexts (outside of criminal law):
- abus de droit ⟶ (in civil law) abuse of rights
- abus de position dominante (in commercial law) see Law 420-2.

accusatoire
adversarial. See § procédure accusatoire et contradictoire.

accusé
The accused person (or defendant, or suspect) suspected or accused of an § infraction of a serious type (i.e., a § délit or a § crime). See also: § accusé, § auteur, § défendeur, § inculpé, § intimé, § prévenu.

acquittement
a decision by a § cour d'assises of not guilty against a defendant. See § relaxe.

acte de barbarie
inhumane act

acte d'écrou
See § écrou.

acte d'huissier
document served by the § huissier (court bailiff)

acte juridique
any document having legal significance; an instrument
a term which has no equivalent in English, but means any document or action which has legal implications (contrast § faits matériels). Examples: legacies, contract offers, notices of arrears, but not negligence or commission of a crime, which are faits matériels.

action publique (Note: This headword has a significant likelihood of being mistranslated when using automatic translation. Machine translation can have difficulty with individual words or expressions for many reasons, including false friends, false cognates, literal translation, neologisms, slang, idiomatic expressions and other unrecognized compounds, words with multiple meanings, words with specialized meanings in certain knowledge domains different from a common meaning of a word in a more general context, and other reasons. These issues can be difficult for human translators as well. In addition, some expressions in French criminal law, criminology, or government have no exact equivalent in English, because the legal, penal, and governmental systems are so different. In some cases, no brief translated expression in English is possible, as it would either be opaque, or misleading.)
public prosecution; criminal proceedings. (Note: The term action publique is translated in various ways in English sources, depending on context. The literal, word-for-word translation is "public action", which if used, is used with an explanation, as it has little meaning in English, outside the literal translation of this concept of French law. What the term action publique actually refers to is "criminal proceedings", or "public prosecution", which itself can be confusing unless one understands that it is the public prosecutor (procureur) who is responsible for prosecutions carried out on behalf of society, and thus the term procureur is generally rendered in English as "public prosecutor", or generically as the "public prosecutor's office". An equivalent term for procureur is § ministère public, rendered in English sources sometimes as "Public ministry" and sometimes left in the original French.) Actions carried out on behalf of society by the § Ministère public (Public Prosecutor's Office) against those involved in a criminal violation. Action publique is defined by article 1 of the § CPP (French code of criminal procedure).
Usage note: déclencher l'action publique ⟶ to institute criminal proceedings

administration des preuves
presentation of evidence

administration penitentiaire
prison service

affaire
case

affaire pénale
criminal case

afflictif
See § Peine afflictive et infamante.

agent de la force publique
law enforcement officer; police officer; police. See also § force publique.

agent de police judiciaire
police officer; judicial police officers of the police nationale (National Police (France)), or gendarmes of the § gendarmerie nationale (National Gendarmerie) See also: § officiers de police judiciaire.

agents de répression
law enforcement officials. See § répressif.

agir sous l'empire de
act under the influence of
Usage note: agir sous l'emprise de ⟶ an eggcorn with the same meaning

agissements incriminés
criminal conduct

à huis clos
in camera

ajournement
old term for § citation directe

à juste titre

correctly; properly

aliénation mentale partielle
partial mental disturbance; a perpetrator found by medical experts to have aliénation mentale partielle is § non-imputable and may be found to lack the § élément moral (mens rea) to be charged with an § infraction.

alinéa
paragraph

amende
fine

amende honorable
public confession, apology

ancien droit
pre-revolutionary law; law of the Ancien régime.

annuler
set aside, declare void; cancel, repeal, nullify. See also § casser.
Usage note:
- annuler un jugement ⟶ set aside a judgment or ruling
- action en annulation ⟶ action to set aside

à perpetuité
life; for life

appel
an appeal. The appelant (same word and spelling in English) is the party who is appealing, while the § intimé (respondent) is the party who is the defendant in the appeal proceeding. See also: § pourvoi, § recours.
Usage notes:
- fol appel ⟶ frivolous or vexatious appeal
- interjeter appel ⟶ when an appeal is made to the Court of Appeal, the term "interjeter appel" is used
- appel des causes ⟶ no recognized translation; nearest equivalent: pre-trial hearing.

application de la loi dans le temps
concerns the legal effects of a law which replaces or amends an older one on the same topic, and the extent to which it applies to situations which arose before it came into force. The old law nevertheless continues to have certain effects.

appréciation souveraine des juges
The exclusive jurisdiction of the court

arme
weapon

arrestation
arrest

arrêt
a judgment (of a court). judgment (of a higher court). Compare: § décision de justice, § jugement, § ordonnance, § relaxe. See also: § cour.
Note: not to be confused with: § arrêté.
Usage note:
- arrêt de cassation – decision to quash a judgment of the lower courts
- arrêt définitif – decision open to appeal on law rather than fact
- arrêt de principe – leading case/seminal decision; case stating a legal principle
- arrêt de rejet – final decision rejecting an appeal on points of law
- grands arrêts – leading cases
- jurisprudence (des arrêts) – case law; see § jurisprudence
- prononcer ou rendre un arrêt – deliver judgment
- suspendre ou surseoir l'éxecution d'un arrêt – suspend the execution of a judgment

arrêt de mise en accusation
Judgment in a criminal proceeding. See also: § mise en accusation.

arrêt de non-lieu
judgment of no case to answer. See also: § non-lieu.

arrêt de renvoi
a judgment referring a case back to another court.

arrêté
order, decision, decree (of a minister, mayor, or other administrative officer)
Note: not to be confused with: § arrêt.

Article 38
Describes an optional feature of lawmaking power-sharing between the parliament and the executive, which may be enabled by a § loi d'habilitation.

Assemblée nationale
National Assembly; the lower chamber of § parlement (parliament).

assemblée plénière
full sitting of the Cour de cassation

assermentation
See § prêter serment.

assigner
to summon.
Usage notes:
- assigner [quelqu'un] en justice or ... au tribunal ⟶ to summon [someone] to appear before the court
- assigner [quelqu'un] à résidence ⟶ to restrict [someone] to a residence

association de malfaiteurs
conspiracy (or, when referring to the § auteurs, co-conspirators)

astreinte
a punitive measure by which a court obliges a guilty person to pay a certain sum of money per day of delay if he does not carry out a prior court order to give or to do something
See also: § être astreinte aux obligations du contrôle judiciaire.

à temps
fixed term

à titre exceptionnel
in exceptional cases

atteinte
attack

attendu que
phrase used to introduce part of a judgement; similar to "whereas"

attributions
powers

audience
(court) hearing, session

audition
questioning
Usage note: audition des témoins ⟶ hearing of witnesses

au sein de
within

auteur
principal offender, defendant; perpetrator. See also: § accusé, § défendeur, § inculpé, § intimé, § prévenu.

auteur intellectuel
see § auteur moral

auteur matériel
principal offender. See also § élément matériel.

auteur moral
person who is treated as the § auteur matériel (principal offender), even if they did not carry out the § élément matériel (actus reus) of the offense; also known as the auteur intellectuel. See also § élément moral.

autorité judiciaire
ordinary courts; judicidary; judicial power
Usage note: avertir les autorités judiciaires ⟶ to alert the legal authorities

autorité legitime
legitimate authority

auxiliaire de justice
officer of the court

avant ... ans révolus
Before turning ... [years old]
Example: avant 18 ans révolus ⟶ "before turning eighteen".

avertissement
summons (in criminal proceedings)

aveu
Confession, or more rarely, statement

avocat
a lawyer, similar to a barrister, with a specific education and training track which is separate from the § procureurs, who have different professional training and are part of the § magistrature.
The profession of avocat is the oldest in France, going back to the Roman period. They play four roles: providing advice before and during trial (assistance), writing reports on behalf of the client (représentation), giving legal advice, and writing documents. Previously, the professions of § avoués and legal advisors (§ conseils juridiques) were separate and had responsibility for some of the advice and documentary roles, but these were merged into the avocat role in 1971 and 1990. There are about 44,000 avocats.

avoué
solicitor; lawyer before the Cour d'Appel
established in a law of 2 November 1945 with later modifications, they previously had sole responsibility for drafting all court pleadings. In a 1971 law, this responsibility was passed to avocats for courts of the first instance, with the avoués retaining responsibility for appeals documents. There remain a few hundred avoués to fulfill this role.

=== B ===
baïonette intelligente
principle according to which subordinates are expected to ensure the legality of an order before executing it. From the term "intelligent bayonet" meaning "intelligent soldier" (baionnette = soldier, by metonymy) who must consider whether an orders he is given is legal or not.

bande organisée
organized gang

bannissement
banishment. A type of punishment under the Ancien régime. See § peine afflictive et infamante.

barreau
See § ordre des avocats.

blanchiment
money laundering; also, whitewashing, and in non-legal context: bleaching

bloc de constitutionnalité
the constitutional block is a set of texts recognized as being invested with the same constitutional force as the French Constitution itself. It includes the Declaration of the Rights of Man and of the Citizen (1789), the preamble of the Constitution of 1946, and the Charter for the Environment (2004).See also § valeur constitutionnelle.

bon père de famille
reasonable person; a bonus pater familias, reasonable man

bourreau
state executioner

bracelet électronique
See § Placement sous surveillance électronique (PSE), § placement sous surveillance électronique mobile (PSEM).

bracelet GPS
See § placement sous surveillance électronique mobile.

=== C ===
caduc
null, void, obsolete (feminine form: caduque)

capacité juridique
legal competence. The ability to have rights and obligations and to exercise them oneself. Minors do not have it, neither do adults under guardianship (tutelle) or curatorship (curatelle).

carcan
an iron collar placed around the neck of a § condamné (prisoner) and fixed to a pillory, a symbol of § haute justice in medieval France. See § peine afflictive et infamante.

cas de force majeure
See § force majeure.

casier judiciaire
criminal record. A record of criminal convictions stored at the National Criminal Record Office of the Ministry of Justice in Nantes.

cassation
Reversal by the § Cour de cassation or by the § conseil d'Etat of a judicial decision rendered contrary to the rules of law.

casser
set aside, annul, quash. See also § annuler.

causes de non-imputabilité
grounds for which a judge might declare a defendant not morally responsible (cf. § élément moral) for a crime, even if they are materially responsible (cf. § élément matériel) for it. It is up to legislators to decide, generally speaking, what acts are to be considered criminal, and it is up to the judges to decide in individual cases whether a defendant is criminally responsible for an act. Some grounds are codified by legislators, such as dementia, physical or moral constraint; the concept of criminal responsibility, in effect presupposes that the perpetrator of a given action acted in full control of their faculties and with § libre arbitre (free will). See also § élément moral, § intention, § aliénation mentale partielle.

céder
to supply. See § cession.

centre de détention
A prison or institutional housing for those inmates with the best prospects for reintegration into society. Their detention is mainly oriented towards the resocialization of prisoners.

centre de semi-liberté
A prison which houses convicts admitted under the § régime de semi-liberté (semi-liberty regime).

cession de stupéfiants
a supply of drugs. From the verb § céder.

Chambre correctionelle
Criminal Division (of the § Tribunal correctionnel, § Tribunal de grande instance, or § Cour d'assises)
Usage note: in larger jurisdictions, numbered to distinguish one from another, as in, le n^{e} chambre correctionalle ⟶ "the n^{th} criminal division"

Chambre d'accusation
division of a § Cour d'appel (appeal court) in charge of a judicial investigation, known since 2000 as the § Chambre de l'instruction

Chambre de l'instruction
name given to the old § Chambre d'accusation following the law of 15 June 2000 on the § Loi sur la présomption d'innocence (Law on the presumption of innocence; a.k.a. § Loi Guigou)
A panel of the § Cour d'appel that examines appeals of decisions rendered by a § juge d'instruction and reviews their lawfulness. Example: order for § mise en examen (indictment); placement under § contrôle judiciaire (judicial supervision).

chose jugée
res judicata

citation
A document delivered by a § huissier de justice (bailiff) or issued by the § greffe (court registry) that orders a person to appear before a court. Example: § citation (summons to appear).

citation directe
A summons delivered to an individual by a § huissier to appear at a certain date before the § tribunal de police or § tribunal correctionnel. Called an § ajournement under the old system.

CJUE
The Court of Justice of the European Union (CJEU) (Cour de justice de l'Union européenne).

classement sec
A decision by the § ministère public (Public Prosecutor's Office) not to prosecute an offense, but to close the affair.

classement sans suite
case dismissed, charges dropped, or no further action (by the prosecutor's office); In the event of an offense, the § ministère public (Public Prosecutor's Office) may decide not to initiate § action publique (criminal proceedings) against the § auteur (perpetrator). The decision can be taken for legal reasons or based on the evidence of the investigation: unidentified perpetrator, absence or insufficient evidence, withdrawal of complaint. See also: § opportunité des poursuites. Contrast: § non-lieu, a dismissal by the § juge d'instruction.

coauteur
a joint principal; based on the idea of a joint endeavor, in which two or more people involved in an act are equally liable for everything that happens, regardless whether they were present or not. The mens rea formed by one is imputed to the others.

Code des délits et des peines
The Code of Offences and Penalties was a criminal code adopted in revolutionary France by the National Convention on 25 October 1795 dealing with judicial organization, § procédure pénale (criminal procedure), and § sanction pénale (criminal sanctions). It established a division between the § police administrative and § police judiciaire (administrative and judiciary police), and led to the duality of the judicial system (§ dualité des ordres de juridiction) with the distinction between the § ordre administratif and the § ordre judiciaire still in force.

(CPP)
French Code of Criminal Procedure. The legal code adopted in 1958 which covers all aspects of French criminal procedure. It a direct successor of and replaced the § Code d'instruction criminelle of 1808. It guides the behavior of police, prosecutors, and judges in how to deal with a possible crime. The current code was established in 1958, and replaced the code of 1808, created under Napoleon.

Code d'instruction criminelle
The Code of Criminal Procedure of 1808 is a collection of legal texts which organized criminal procedure in the revolutionary era in France. It was replaced by the French code of criminal procedure in 1958.

code pénale
French criminal code; also called the "penal code".

commetre
to commit

commission rogatoire
A request from a judge in one jurisdiction, to an § officier de police judiciaire or to a judge in another (or in a foreign country) to carry out investigative measures or other judicial acts on their behalf. Similar to Letters rogatory. The § juge d'instruction can delegate investigative acts to the police via a commission rogatoire
delegation of authority by a judge, usually to the police, to carry out the initial investigation of the case

comparution
Appearance; the act of appearing in court.

comparution immédiate
Procedure by which the perpetrator of an § infraction is brought before the § tribunal correctionnel at the end of his § garde à vue (custody), to be tried. See also § flagrant délit.

comparution sur reconnaissance préalable de culpabilité (CRPC)
French justice does not have a guilty plea or plea bargaining as in common law, but the CRPC allows the prosecutor to offer a reduced sentence of up to one year in prison or half of the maximum penalty if the defendant admits the offense. Introduced in 2004 and later extended to almost all § délits, by 2012 it was 13% of délit prosecutions. See also § coupable.

compétence
jurisdiction.
Usage:
- avoir compétence – exercise jurisdiction
- clause d'attribution des compétences – jurisdiction clause
- compétences d'attribution – special jurisdiction
- compétence exclusive – Sole jurisdiction
- se déclarer compétent – accept jurisdiction
- se déclarer incompétent – Decline jurisdiction
- décliner la compétence du tribunal – to take a plea against the jurisdiction of the court
- juge compétent – judge having jurisdiction
- relever de la compétence de – to fall under the jurisdiction of

compétent
(of a court): having the appropriate jurisdiction to investigate and try a given type of § infraction. See also § présomption d'innocence.
False friend warning: this is *not* the same as the English term "competent" in the sense of legally of sound mind, which in French is rendered by § capacité juridique.

complice
accomplice

complicité correspective
analysis in which the § coauteur (joint principal) is also ispo facto an accomplice

complot
conspiracy (see also: § association de malfaiteurs)

condamnation
conviction. In criminal matters, it is a court decision/verdict declaring a person § coupable (guilty) of committing an § infraction and imposing a § peine (sentence).

condamnation avec sursis
suspended sentence. A sentence that the convicted person is excused from having to serve, unless found guilty for some other offense within five years.

condamnation définitive
A conviction becomes final when all recourses have been exhausted (e.g., appeal). It cannot be challenged unless the trial is reviewed.

condamnation par défaut
Conviction resulting from a trial in absentia of a person without representation and who was not aware of the date of the § audience (hearing). Compare § plainte contre X.

condamné
convicted person; A person who has been found guilty of an § infraction (offense) by a § condamnation définitive (final decision) and upon whom a § sanction (penalty) is imposed.

confiscation d'un objet
confiscation of an asset

conseil d'État
The Conseil d'État, or Council of state, is the supreme court of the § ordre administratif (administrative order). This is not part of criminal law, which is under the § ordre judiciaire.

consentement
Consent

considérant que
phrase used to introduce part of a judgement; similar to "§ whereas"

consommation
commission (in non-legal contexts: consumption, intake, use of)

constat
official report

constatation
finding, proof

contrainte
constraint

contrainte pénale
a new type of probationary sentence for délits, created in 2014 as a result of the conférence de consensus (Consensus Commission) established by justice minister Christiane Taubira to reduce recidivism.

contravention
A non-criminal offense (such as a parking ticket) is a minor offense judged by the police court. The offender is liable to a fine and/or a penalty that deprives or restricts his rights, such as suspension of the driver's license, a ban on issuing checks, etc. One of three types of criminal offenses (§ infraction), the others being § délit and § crime.

contrôle judiciaire
Judicial supervision. A penal measure ordered by the § juge d'instruction or the § juge des libertés et de la détention (liberty and custody judge) pending trial. The convicted person is subject to certain obligations (answering summonses from the § SPIP, a prohibition on meeting certain people or frequenting certain places, § obligation de soins (court-ordered treatment) etc. and may benefit, depending on his or her situation, from social support. See § suivi judiciaire.

contrôle restreinte
judicial review

contumace
contempt of court

copie exécutoire
See § grosse.

coupable

1. (adjective) guilty.
2. (noun) guilty person. There is no guilty plea in French criminal law. A defendant may confess to a crime, but this becomes one more piece of evidence that can be used against them. Plea bargaining does not exist. But see: § comparution sur reconnaissance préalable de culpabilité.

coups et blessures volontaires
crime of intentionally injuring another

cour
Court.
Usage note: cour and § tribunal both mean "court", but there is a hierarchy between them: tribunal is a court of § instance, whereas a § cour is an appeals court. Further, different terms are used for their rulings: a § tribunal gives a § jugement, whereas a cour renders an § arrêt.

Cour d'appel
court of appeal

Cour d'assises
court that tries the most serious offenses. The court having jurisdiction over § crime, composed of three professional judges and six jurors. In principle, it is situated in the chief town of the department or in the seat of the court of appeal if there is one in the department. Appeals against conviction verdicts (§ condamnation) handed down by an Assize Court are reviewed by another Assize Court composed of three professional judges and nine jurors.

Cour d'assises de mineurs
court that tries serious offenses by minors

Cour de cassation
court that hears final appeals on points of law only. The supreme court of the § ordre judiciaire, dealing within the 'ordinary' courts, located in Paris. Its role is not to retry a case, but to check that court decisions have been rendered in accordance with the rules of law. An appeal before this court is called a § pourvoi en cassation.

Coutume
a usage held to be obligatory by the social order, as if it were the result of a law. It is formed by the accumulation of precedents.
Usage:
- Droit coutumier en France – law based on custom; dating to the Middle Ages and referring mainly to the Ancien Régime. See § pays de droit coutumier
- a saying: "une fois n'est pas coutume" – "once is not a coutume".

CPP
See § Code de procédure pénale

CRPC
See § comparution sur reconnaissance préalable de culpabilité.

crime
serious offense; serious crime; an offense judged by a § court of assizes. The penalty is more than 10 years imprisonment and the fine is at least 75,000 euros.
Translation note: Despite the obvious cognate, there is no wide agreement on how to translate crime into English, and in the context of the penal code, the English word crime is rarely if ever used. Translator Edward Tomlinson chose the words felony. See the Translation note at § délit.

crime contre l'humanite
crime against humanity

crime de guerre
war crime

culpabilité
guilt. See § coupable.

=== D ===
déchéance
disqualification Loss of a right as a penalty, or because of non-compliance with conditions governing its exercise. Example: loss of civic rights following a criminal conviction.

décision de justice
A written summary of the case, representing the resolution adopted by the court and the reasoning that led to it. Compare: § arrêt, § jugement, § ordonnance, and § relaxe. See also: § cour.

décision de relaxe
acquittal See § relaxe.

décision de renvoi
decision to send the defendant for trial See § renvoi.

décolation
decapitation

décret
A decree, which, according to Article 37 of the Constitution is a regulation that may be issued by the government in any area that is not within the scope specifically assigned to Parliament. See also: § arrêté, § hierarchie des normes.
a type of § règlement (regulation) which is issued by the Prime Minister or the President A décret is subject to § recours en annulation (judicial review) by the § Conseil d'État (Council of State. Contrast: § arrêté.
In the § hiérarchie des normes, a décret is below a § loi and above an § arrêté.
Background: Historically, the word décret has undergone numerous changes of meaning since its use under the Ancien régime, where it meant an arrest warrant. During the Constitutional monarchy (1789–92), it took on the new meaning of a text from the legislative branch. In the Constitution of 1795 the term was replaced by résolution. It reappeared in the Napoleonic era with the meaning of a text promulgated by the head of state, disappearing and reappearing again several times with various senses, until it finally took its current meaning in the Constitution of 1848. Until the end of the Third Republic, a décret could be issued only by the head of state; in the Third Republic and Fourth Republic the head of government also had this power.

décret-loi
§ décret-loi (plural: décrets-lois), an exceptional power of the executive during the post-WWI crisis period of the Third Republic. Décrets-lois were enabling measures taken during the interwar period expanding the powers of the executive to balance the budget and protect the monetary system. Although subject to parliamentary ratification, they were seen as having the force of law. This ability of the executive to create law was abrogated in the Constitution of the Fourth Republic in 1946, and then resurrected in the § loi d'habilitation provision of the 1958 Constitution of the Fifth Republic.

défaut criminel
Literally 'criminal default', a judgment by default describes the court procedure by which a criminal trial may proceed, even in the absence of the defendant.

défendeur
defendant. See also: § accusé, § auteur, § inculpé, § intimé, § prévenu.

se deféndre
to defend oneself

défit
wrongful conduct

délai de prescription
See § prescription.

délation
a § denonciation considered vile and despicable

délictuel
adjectival form of § délit, meaning: that which constitutes a délit, or is characteristic of a délit. Also: délictuelle, délictueux, délictueuse.
Example: "Un délit est une infraction punie d'une peine délictuelle" ⟶ A délit is an offense punishable by a criminal ("delictuel") punishment."

délit
A middle-ranking criminal offense (Note: There is no agreement in English sources about how to refer to délit in English. The tripartite division of infractions in French law does not line up well with concepts in common law, and translations of délit into English vary. For further details, see French criminal law.) judged by a § tribunal correctionnel (correctional court). In the tripartite division of § infractions (offenses), it is of intermediate seriousness between a § contravention (minor) and a § crime (major). The maximum sentence is ten years, minimum is a 3750 Euro fine. Alternative sentences include community service (§ travail d'intérêt général), a citizenship workshop (§ stage de citoyenneté), or additional penalties.
Usage note: in informal language, may mean any offense. The adjectival form is § delictuel, delictueux, -euse.
Translation note: There is no agreement in English sources about how to refer to délit in English. The tripartite division of § infractions in French law does not line up well with concepts in common law, and translations of délit into English vary greatly. Some terms seen include: felony, major offense, intermediate offense, minor offense, minor crime, and misdemeanor. Many English sources describe the term on first appearance, and then just refer to it using the French term after that. Note that the English cognate delict exists (see Delict) but that word is rarely used in English to represent the French term.
Edward Tomlinson described the problem in the Transator's Preface to his 1999 translation of the 1994 Penal code. Tomlinson chose the words felony, misdemeanor, and petty infraction for the French terms § crime, délit, and § contravention. He points out how inexact the correspondence is between the French and English terms, and that délit has a broad range of possible penalties which at high end can be ten years imprisonment, which is well within the range of felonies in the common law system.

délit materièl
a major offense which only requires as a mens rea that the defendant's conduct be voluntary

démande en justice
legal claim; court petition; plaintiff's claim.

déni de justice
miscarriage of justice; refusal of a jurisdiction to judge a case. Contrast: § principe d'opportunité des poursuites.

dénoncer
Literally: to denounce. When notice of an § infraction (offense) is given to the police or to the § procureur (public prosecutor's office) by a third party, the verb used is dénoncer, and the notice is a dénonciation. Compare: § porter plainte.

se dépêcher sur les lieux
See § lieu du crime.

déportation
deportation

dépositaire de la force publique
law enforcement officer

déposition
Testimony given before a court, magistrate, gendarme or police officer.
Usage note: déposer en justice ⟶ to give evidence in court

détention
detention See also § emprisonnement and § réclusion. (Note: Imprisonment – Three terms in French with very similar meanings all translate to imprisonment in English: § emprisonnement, § réclusion and § détention. The word emprisonnement is a generic term, and means the same as its cognate in English in the normal sense, that is, to be deprived of one's liberty by being held in a prison. The other two words have specific meanings defined in the penal code which are nearly identical: both réclusion and détention mean to be imprisoned for a fixed term of at least ten and at most thirty years (more than that, and it's called § réclusion a perpétuité because there is no fixed prison term exceeding 30 years). The difference between the two is not the sentence, but the crime involved: if you are convicted of a political crime, the sentence is called § détention criminelle, and if for any other type of infraction other than a political crime, it's called § réclusion criminelle, even if the two sentences are otherwise identical.)

détention provisoire
remand in custody.
a measure ordered by the § juge des libertés et de la détention at the request of the § juge d'instruction (investigating judge). The latter may request that a person under investigation for a § crime or § délit punishable by at least three years' imprisonment be placed in prison *before* trial. The § détention provisoire (pre-trial detention) must be strictly substantiated according to the conditions provided by law.

détenu
A person incarcerated in a penitentiary by court order.

détournement
misappropriation; the act of dispossessing someone of something of value which was entrusted to them in confidence. Can be a civil or professional offense, or a criminal offense. Among the latter, it constitutes the § élément matériel of § délits such as § abus de confiance. See also: § abus. Some subtopics:
- Détournement de biens par un dépositaire public (CP 432-15)
- détournement de fonds, a confidence scheme involving fraudulent appropriation of funds
- détournement de mineur, removing a minor from the adults having authority over them; kidnapping (CP 227-7)
- détournement d'objet donné en gage, removal of a security or collateral intended for a creditor (CP 314-5)
- détournement d'objet saisi moving (hiding) an object for which confiscation has been ordered (CP 314-6)
- détournement de pouvoir, when a public official goes beyond their remit, in order to achieve a goal not within the authority of their position. (such acts are nullified, and not a criminal offense) See § abus de pouvoir.
- détournement de procédure, when a public official uses a technique envisioned by law for one specific purpose, for a different one, in order to get around some judicial obstacle and attain some other goal. (a civil, not a criminal offense)

detournement de fonds
embezzlement.
Usage note: détourner ⟶ to misappropriate; détournement ⟶ misappropriation

diligences
care

dispositif
court's finding (stated at the end of the decision)
The dispositif of a § décision de justice (court decision) is the last part of a judgment or ruling that describes the resolution of the dispute and is binding on the parties.

doctrine
academic writing, learned opinion, the writing of leading authorities

d'office
ex officio; by virtue of their office. The ability of a public official to act on their own accord, rather than by request of someone.
Usage note: depending on context, could be translated as 'automatically', 'by virtue of their office', 'acting on their own initiative'.

dol
fault;
a fraudulent scheme to deceive another person in order to obtain their consent Compare confidence game.
Specific forms:
- dol aggravé ⟶ additional mens rea beyond § dol général or § dol spécial special intention
- dol dépassé ⟶ the repercussions of the act go beyond the intention of, or the foreseeable outcome by the defendant. See Preterintention.
- dol éventuel ⟶ oblique or indirect intention; See also § intention.
- dol général ⟶ Deliberate commission of a criminal act, while having foreknowledge that the act is prohibited by law and has criminal sanctions.
- dol imprécis ⟶ See § dol indéterminé.
- dol indéterminé ⟶ where a person acts intending a certain result, but without being able to foresee the actual outcome
- dol spécial ⟶ criminal intent. There is dol spécial, or criminal intent, when the perpetrator of an act that threatens an interest protected by criminal law does so with the intention of damaging that interest.

droit

1. the law: an abstract term for 'the law' (as opposed to § loi, which is an individual law); a set of rules governing life in society.
2. a right (as in, the right to do something; human rights): the prerogatives attributed to an individual.

In other contexts:
- a fee or duty
- right (adj.; as opposed to left)
- straight (ligne droite; straight line)

droit civil
Civil law. One of the two branches of § droit privé (private law), the other being § droit pénal (criminal law). Includes the fields of § droit commercial (commercial law), droit social (welfare law), (droit judiciaire privé) civil procedure, and others

droit coutumier
See § pays de droit coutumier, and § coutume.

droit écrit
Literally, "written law". In a traditional sense, mostly used in the expression § pays de droit écrit ("land of written law") referring to the south of France in the context of the development of law in France during the Middle Ages. In a more modern sense, refers to documents such as the § Constitution, statutes (§ lois), regulations (§ réglements), and § ordonnances which are defined and delineated in the Constitution.

droit impératif
Also, régle impérative; closely related to § ordre public, this is a law of guidance for the citizen that has a higher level of compulsion than § droit supplétif and may not be overridden.

droit pénal
criminal law. Criminal law is "the set of legal rules that govern the State's response to offenses and offenders". Droit pénal deals with an individual's rights and obligations under the law, as codified in a criminal code (§ code pénal). Under French criminal law, the criminal code (defines what acts (or omissions) are punishable. Contrast § procédure pénale.

droit positif
Positive law

droit privé
private law, concerned with the rights between private individuals. In Montesquieu's words: "laws concerning the relationship that all citizens have with each other". One half of § dualisme juridictionnel (jurisdictional dualism).
All the rules that concern the acts and lives of individuals or of § personnes morales (legal persons; i.e., private legal entities, such as companies or associations). Contrast: § droit public.

droit public
public law; pertains to the relationship between the government and the governed. One half of § dualisme juridictionnel (jurisdictional dualism).
the relationship between the State and the individual, or the organization of the state
All the rules concerning the organization and operation of the State, local authorities, and administration, as well as their relations with private persons. Contrast: § droit privé.

droit supplétif
Also régle supplétive; closely related to § ordre public, this is a law of guidance for the citizen that is presumed to be followed in the absence of evidence to the contrary; a default course of action which may, however, be overridden under explicit circumstances. Contrast with § droit impératif, which has a higher level of compulsion and may not be overridden.

dualisme juridictionnel

Schema showing jurisdictional dualism in the French legal system

Jurisdictional dualism in France, Lit., "jurisdictional duality"; consists in the existence of two separate jurisdictional systems, or "orders of jurisdiction": the § ordre administratif (administrative order) corresponding to public law (§ droit public) and the § ordre judiciaire (judicial order) corresponding to private law (§ droit privé), headed respectively by the § Conseil d'État (Council of State) for administrative law, and the § Cour de cassation (Court of Cassation) for judicial law (with conflicts of jurisdiction between the two handled by the § Tribunal des conflits). This jurisdictional separation resulted from a long political and administrative history, and is now constitutionally protected.

=== E ===
écartèlement
dismemberment. An extremely brutal punishment resulting in death. Used during the Ancien Régime, and usually reserved for regicide. Abolished by the penal code of 1791 during the French Revolution.

École nationale de la magistrature (ENM)
the National Judicial Academy in Bordeaux, responsible for educating judges.

écrou
A § procès verbal (written legal act) that a person has been turned over to a prison warden for detention, including the name of the inmate, the date, and the reasons for incarceration. An act of committal; a legal document drawn up for any person who is taken to a penitentiary establishment or who presents himself there voluntarily.
In other contexts: a hardware nut.

effraction
breaking (of a lock, door, fence, or other barrier to an enclosed area)
Usage notes:
- entrée par effraction ⟶ entrance by force break-in
- entrer par effraction ⟶ to break in
- pénétrer par effraction ⟶ breaking and entering
- vol par effraction ⟶ burglary

égalité devant la loi
equality before the law.

élément intellectuel
Another name for § élément moral

élément matériel
the actus reus of an offense (lit.: material element). This is the visible, external part of the offense, i.e., the actions involved in carrying out a criminal act. Contrast: § élément moral.

élément moral
the mens rea of an offense (lit.: 'guilty mind'); i.e., the psychological attitude of the perpetrator towards the commission of the acts deemed to be punishable by criminal law. The perpetrator may have acted with intent, or through recklessness or negligence. Also known as § élément intellectuel, and § élément psychologique. Contrast: § élément matériel. See also: § dol général, § dol spécial, § intention, and § causes de non-imputabilité.

élément psychologique
Another name for § élément moral

éléments
In context, éléments by itself can mean any of the related multi-word terms, especially § éléments de preuve (evidence).

éléments d'appréciation
information; criteria; background info; key aspects; indications; evidence; considerations.

éléments de preuve
evidence.

empire
See also: § agir sous l'empire de.

empreinte génétique
The genetic characteristics permitting an individual to be identified. See also: § FNAEG.

emprisonnement
imprisonment. See also § détention and § réclusion.

emprisonnement à perpétuité
life imprisonment. See § réclusion criminelle à perpétuité.

encourir une peine
incur a punishment

enfreindre les prohibitions légales
to break the law

enlèvement
abduction; kidnapping

en matière correctionnelle
for major offenses; in cases involving major offenses

enquête de flagrance
expedited investigation (with extended powers) of recently committed offenses (within 16 days). Compare § enquête préliminaire.
the police investigation implemented in cases of flagrance, i.e. a restrictive definition of flagrante delicto.

enquête officieuse
Old name for § enquête préliminaire.

enquête préliminaire
ordinary police investigation (without special powers). Compare § enquête de flagrance.
an investigation by the judicial police

enquête de police
police investigation

entraver
impede

Équipes régionales d'intervention et de sécurité (ERIS)
Special forces of the prison administration system who intervene in case of serious tensions at a prison. It is composed of about forty specially trained and equipped surveillance personnel who attempt to prevent incidents from escalating, participate in general searches and restore order if necessary.

ERIS
See § Équipes régionales d'intervention et de sécurité.

erreur d'appréciation
error of judgment; erreur manifeste d'appréciation ⟶ manifest error of judgment

erreur sur le droit
error of law

escroquerie
fraud

essorillement
cropping; removal of a person's ears as a physical punishment. See § mutilation, § peine afflictive et infamante.

état de droit
rule of law (lit. "state of law"). État de droit is one of many ways that the principle of "rule of law" is rendered in French, including: prééminence du droit, primauté du droit, principe de droit, régime de droit, règne du droit, respect de la loi, principe de légalité, or communauté de droit. Although there is debate about the point, there is a general consensus that état de droit and rule of law are equivalent.

état civil
literally 'civil status', but no equivalent in English law. Designates a range of characteristics of a person that define both rights and duties based on age, nationality, parentage, adoption, premature majority (émancipation). These are kept in a special records office presided over by the officier de l'état civil.

étatique
derived from the state

être astreinte aux obligations du contrôle judiciaire
to be subjected to conditional bail

être assimilé à une arme
to be classed as a weapon

être astreinte aux obligations du contrôle judiciaire
to be subjected to conditional bail

être poursuivi
to be prosecuted

être puni de
to be punished with

être reconnu coupable
to be found guilty

exercer l'action publique
to bring a prosecution; see § action publique.

=== F ===
fait incriminé
criminal conduct

fait justificatif
See § justification.

faute caracterisée
established fault

faute contraventionnelle
the mens rea of minor offenses

faute d'imprudence
carelessness

faux témoignage
False testimony. Perjury is a very serious offense, since it undermines not only one of the parties to trial, but also the moral authority of justice. If it is committed for money, it is considered to be corruption.

fers
imprisoned; [condemned to] forced labor (§ travaux forcés); literally: "irons". (antiquated) Not to be confused with § marque au fer rouge.
Usage notes: Jeter quelqu'un dans les fers, le retenir dans les fers; mettre aux fers.
an old punishment, defined in the French Penal Code of 1791 and retained in the Code des délits et des peines (Code of Offences and Penalties).

flagellation
whipping, or flagellation; a type of corporal punishment under the Ancien régime. See § peine afflictive et infamante.

flagrant délit
A crime in progress, or having just been committed; in flagrante delicto. If punishable by a prison term, the § parquet can bring the accused rapidly before the judge in a § comparution immédiate in order to be judged. See also § enquête de flagrance.

flétrissure
branding. A type of corporal punishment under the Ancien régime. See § peine afflictive et infamante.

FNAEG
The Fichier national automatisé des empreintes génétiques is a national system for managing the data about genetic traces of those convicted of certain crimes (rape, murder, drug-dealing) as well as those suspected of those crimes with strong evidence, in order to facilitate the identification and apprehension of perpetrators.

fol appel
See § appel.

fond
refers to the issues of fact in a case upon which the judge rules. See also: § jugement; contrast: § forme.
Usage:
- droit pénal de fond – that part of criminal code which defines substantive issues.
- sur le fond – in a French court judgment, means based on the substantive issues involved.

force exécutoire
that which can be enforced, if necessary, by the public force (Example: a judgment). Certain ordinances, notably administrative or notarial, can also be enforceable.

force majeure
An unforeseen, insurmountable event beyond a person's control that may relieve someone of legal responsibility for certain acts.
Usage note: often seen as cas de force majeure.

force publique
law enforcement; police. See also § agent de la force publique.

forclusion
Loss of a right which was not exercised within the prescribed time limit. Example: expiration of the time allowed to appeal a case.

forme
refers to the procedural issues in a case upon which the judge rules. See also: § jugement; contrast: § fond.
Usage:
- droit pénal de forme – that part of criminal code which defines the procedures and jurisdictional issues.
- sur le forme – in a French court judgment, means based on the procedural issues involved.

former un pourvoi
See § pourvoi.

formule
A boilerplate text serving as a model which can be used to draft legal documents of the same type. Example: a formule de testament is a boilerplate draft which can be used as a starting point for drawing up a testament.

formule exécutoire
the wording affixed by the § greffier (clerk) at the bottom of the copy of a court decision (judgment or ruling) intended for the party that won the case, to enable them to proceed with enforcement. This enforceable copy is called the "§ grosse".

fouille
search
Usage notes:
- une fouille corporelle, or une fouille à corps: body search, personal search.
- fouille des bagages: baggage search
- fouiller : to frisk
- in other contexts (plural only): fouilles: excavations, archaeological dig

frapper quelqu'un d'une peine
to impose a punishment on someone

frauduleux
with guilty intent. See also § intention frauduleuse.

fuite
escape

=== G ===
galères
A sentence of travail forcé (forced labor) as a galley slave (galérien), as a type of punishment under the Ancien régime. See § peine afflictive et infamante.

garde à vue (GAV)
arrest; police custody during a police investigation. Normally, the detention lasts a maximum 24 hours; covered in § CPP article 62-2. Formerly, garde à vue applied to witnesses as well.
Usage note: mis[e] en garde à vue or placé[e] en garde à vue ⟶ "held in [police] custody", "taken into custody", "placed under arrest"

Garde des sceaux
An alternate name for the § ministère de la justice (Minister of Justice). The Keeper of the Seals is a title held by the Minister of Justice. The Minister guards the Great Seal of France in their office. The Seal was used in 1958 to seal the Constitution of France. See also: § scellés.

Gendarmerie Nationale
National Gendarmerie. One of the two main corps of § police judiciaire, comprising two groups: the departmental gendarmerie, and the mobile gendarmerie. Compare National Police.

gens de loi
practicing lawyers; the legal community

grand tableau
official roll (of § avocats). Literally: "large table".

greffe
Registrar services of a court staffed by court officers who help the magistrates. The registry is directed by the chief registrar.
Usage: droit de greffe: registrar fee (e.g., for copies); greffe d'instance: regional court registry; greffer: to be an adjunct of;

greffier
a judicial clerk; court clerk. Auxiliary officers who perform clerical duties, draw up documents, and ensure their authenticity and safekeeping. All informational acts by a § juge d'instruction must be performed with the assistance of his clerk.

grosse
A copy of a court decision bearing the § formule exécutoire, a draft of the order necessary to enforce it. The name derives from the fact that it in earlier times, the person delivering it was paid by the page, so it was to their advantage to write it in large letters to increase the number of pages and thus earn a higher fee. Now better known as the § copie exécutoire.

=== H ===
haute justice
highest of three levels of § justice seigneuriale under the Ancien régime

hauteur
á toute hauteur de la procédure ⟶ at any stage of the proceedings

heures légales
legal hours; hours in which process may be served (7 a.m. – 9 p.m.) and judgments executed

hiérarchie des normes

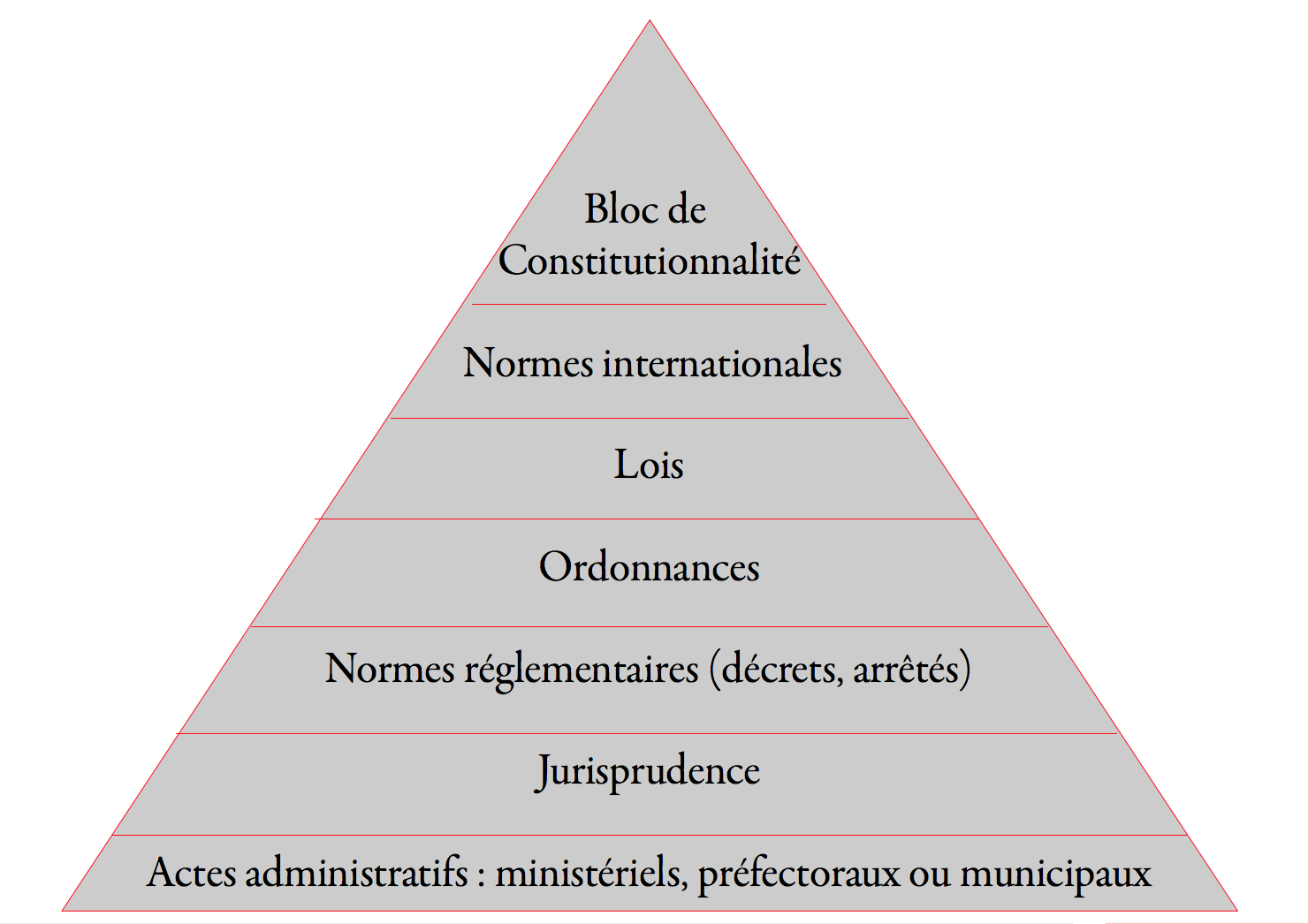
Kelsen's pyramid of norms

hierarchy of norms, or hierarchy of laws. An analysis which views laws as occupying a hierarchy in which laws base their validity upon a higher level norm, and so on, forming a hierarchy, such that laws are validated in a regression of validity ending in the Constitution. The notion was first developed by Hans Kelsen in his Pure Theory of Law and the hierarchy concept is often referred to in French legal texts. Often visualized as "Kelsen's pyramid".

homicide
homicide

homicide volontaire
voluntary homicide

homicide involuntaire
involuntary homicide; voluntary manslaughter

huissier
bailiff, sheriff, process-server. a ministerial officer charged with writing certain documents, and implementing certain acts or judiciary decisions. Some functions are similar to that of an authorized bailiff, or an official process server authorized by the government.

=== I ===
immobilisation d'un objet
freezing of assets

impossibilité materielle
physical impossibility

imprudence
imprudence

impunité
impunity

imputabilité
The possibility of attributing an act to someone or something; blameworthiness, or the ability of someone to recognize their action as being unlawful. See also: § non-imputabilité, § élément moral, § aliénation mentale partielle

imputation
imputation is the action of attributing an action to a person
Usage note:
- imputation diffamatoire – defamatory allegation; innuendo

inappellable
see § inattaquable

inattaquable
not subject to appeal, unchallengeable

incapacité
incapacity, disability, disqualification
of a private person: someone deprived—by law or by court order—of the enjoyment or exercise of certain rights. This is the case for minors or protected adults (majeurs protégés).
Usage notes:
- incapacité d'ester en justice ⟶ lack of standing before the court
- incapacité d'exercice ⟶ incapacity to exercise one's own rights without assistance; absence of legal capacity
- fr:incapacité permanente ⟶ permanent disability

incarcération
imprisonment

incendiaire
arsonist

incendie volontaire
arson

incitation
Usage notes:
- incitation au crime ⟶ incitement to commit a felony
- fr:Incitation à la haine ⟶ incitement to ethnic or racial hatred
- incitation au faux témoignage ⟶ subornation of perjury

incompétence
lack of jurisdiction. Inability of a court to hear a case for reasons relating either to the nature of the case (e.g., the § tribunal correctionnel cannot try § crime (major crimes) ), or to the nature of the person involved (e.g., the correctional court cannot try minors), or to the geographical location of one or more of the parties (e.g., the correctional court cannot try an offense committed outside its § ressort (geographical jurisdiction) by a perpetrator who lives outside the jurisdiction) See also: compétent.
Usage notes:
- déclaration d'incompétence ⟶ finding of lack of jurisdiction
- incompétence a raison du lieu ⟶ lack of jurisdiction ratione loci such as the defendant's place of residence
- se déclarer incompétent ⟶ refuse jurisdiction
- incompétent ⟶ lacking jurisdiction

in concreto
subjective

inconduite
misconduct, immorality

incriminé
Usage notes:
- décision incriminé ⟶ decision appealed against; decision of the court below
- fait incriminé ⟶ offense charged; matter being complained of
- jugement incriminé ⟶ judgement being appealed

inculpation
See § mise en examen.

inculpé
accused, defendant, person charged with a criminal offense. See also: § accusé, § auteur, § défendeur, § intimé, § prévenu.

indicateur
Informant, informer; someone who provides privileged information to law. enforcement. Also: informateur.

indices
clues. Traces, items, or material circumstances, which can be examined objectively and which may shed light on certain facts surrounding the commission of an offense.

individualisation des peines
a principle recognized by a decision of the Conseil constitutionnel (Constitutional Council (France) as deriving from article 8 of the Declaration of the Rights of Man and of the Citizen.

infamie
Infamie (disgrace) is a decision, action or omission that undermines a person's reputation, taints his honor, or stains him with dishonor. Doucet I-6. Roman law, and Ancient law after it, recognized the judicial decision of infamy, which subjected the person concerned to certain social degradations. This type of sanction can work with people concerned with their honor and reputation.
See § peine infamante.

information judiciaire
preliminary investigation; the phase of criminal proceedings that precedes a judgment and during which the § juge d'instruction, under the control of the § Chambre de l'instruction (Investigating Chamber), carries out research to establish the truth, gathers and assesses evidence, hears the persons involved or being prosecuted and the witnesses, and decides whether or not to charge a person (mettre en examen) and what action to take: See § instruction préparatoire.

informateur
See § indicateur.

infraction
Offense. conduct prohibited by the criminal law and punishable by a penalty specified in the law. Offenses are divided into three categories: § contravention, § délit. § crime. Offenses are usually reported to the police, but may also be reported directly to the § ministère public (public prosecutor's office). See also: § porter plainte, § dénoncer, § sanction pénale

infraction contre un bien
offense against property

infraction contre la personne
offense against a person

infraction criminelle
a serious offense; a crime. Narrower in meaning than "criminal offense" in English, which can cover a variety of offenses from very serious to petty. See § crime, which also has a narrower meaning than English "crime", and § infraction.

infraction flagrante
offense giving rise to an expedited investigation

infraction formelle
complete offense that does not require a result

infraction matérielle
offense which only requires as a mens rea that the defendant's conduct be voluntary. The nearest UK equivalent is a strict liability offense.

infraction pénale
criminal offense
An offense is a behavior strictly forbidden by criminal law and sanctioned by a penalty provided for by it. Infractions are divided into three types; from most to least serious, they are: § crime, § délit, and § contravention. The English cognate infraction is less often used for this, and in fact is more often seen as the translation of contravention, as in Tomlinson's use of petty infraction to translate § contravention.

injonction thérapeutique
A measure ordered against a person convicted of a § crime or § délit, particularly in the case of a sexual or drug offense. It is pronounced by a magistrate after expert medical advice and upon the agreement of the convict. The convicted person then undergoes medical treatment and monitoring by a doctor.

injustifié
unjustified

inquisitoire
inquisitorial See § procédure inquisitoire.

instance
A dispute brought before a court of law, as well as the entirety of the proceedings, from the initial petition to the judgment. In principle, in the event of an appeal, the case gives rise to new instance, or set of proceedings before another court. The initial petition takes place before a court of first instance, and if appealed, that would be a court of second instance.

instruction
pre-trial investigation; judicial investigation; the investigative procedure in which a § juge d'instruction gathers evidence about the commission of an offense and decides on referral to the trial court of the accused parties. See also § instruction préparatoire.

instruction préparatoire
Also known as information judiciaire, or just information, this is the phase of criminal proceedings in which the § juge d'instruction uses all the means to gather everything necessary to establish the truth of the matter (expert reports, searches, hearings, confrontations), so the court can make an informed decision. The judge investigates evidence for and against the accused, i.e. he gathers all the elements in favor and against the accused. See also: § mise en examen, § témoin assisté, § commission rogatoire, § détention provisoire, § contrôle judiciaire, § juge des libertés et de la détention

instruit à charge et à décharge
investigate the charges and the defense; gather evidence both for and against; searches for incriminating and exculpatory evidence

intention
intention See also: § dol éventuel, § élément moral, § responsabilité pénale.
Intention frauduleuse ⟶ guilty intent

interdiction
banning

interjeter appel
See § appel.

interrompre l'execution d'une infraction
prevent the commission of an offense

intimé
respondent; party who is the defendant in an § appel (appeal proceeding). See also: See also: § accusé, § auteur, § défendeur, § inculpé, § intimé, § prévenu.

intime conviction
personal conviction

irrecevabilité
Impossibility for a court to study a request for justice, on the grounds that it does not respect the conditions required by law, whether they are a question of form (e.g., the time limit of the procedure not being respected) or of substance (e.g., a person claiming to be a victim does not provide proof of the alleged damage).

irresponsabilité pénale
Provisions of the law which exonerate a perpetrator from criminal responsibility for an offense and therefore exclude any conviction against him, in cases such as mental disorder, duress, self-defense, state of necessity. See § causes de non-imputabilité, § élément moral, § libre arbitre.

=== J ===
JAP
See § juge de l'application des peines.

JLD
See § juge des libertés et de la détention.

jonction
Fusion of two dossiers by a judge when they are sufficiently related, and one ruling suffices for both.

jour-amende
day-fine

juge de l'application des peines (JAP)
probation judge; (Note: There is no general agreement among English sources about how to represent this term in English. At least one source (adjacent) uses this term.) The judge responsible for supervising the implementation of prison sentences (leave, § libération conditionnelle (parole), semi-liberty, § bracelet électronique (electronic surveillance) with the goal of § réinsertion (reintegration into society) and the prevention of § récidive (recidivism). They review the sentence, assess the offender's employment and family situation, and any efforts they have made to make amends or reparations, and may decide on a different penalty than the one received at trial. See also: § tribunal de l'application des peines.

juge
judge, court. By metonymy, it may also be used to mean courts in general. (Note: French legal language and expression tends to be a lot more abstract than usage in common law, including widespread use of metonymy and synecdoche. Examples include terms like § le juge, which may refer to all courts in general, or le législateur, which may mean the law-making body more generally. While one becomes familiar with some usage in time after reading French jurisprudence and other legal texts, sometimes this type of language may leave the intended meaning unclear to all but experts in French law. Where a French text refers to "le juge des saisies", even after carefully studying the context, it might mean: a) all courts which have the right to rule on questions of distraint of property; b) one particular court having this power; c) all courts which have the specific power to order distraints; or d) one such court. This type of abstract use of language can be problematic when reading French jurisprudence.)

juge délegué
a judicial post that existed briefly between two reforms in 1993 before being abolished; was responsible for deciding whether to put someone into § détention provisoire

juge des libertés et de la détention (JLD)
judge responsible for deciding whether to place someone in § détention provisoire (pre-trial detention) or grant bail. Created by the 2000 § loi Guigou on the § présomption d'innocence (presumption of innocence).

juge d'instruction
Investigating judge. In criminal procedure, the magistrate in charge of gathering all the elements of an offense. In charge of the most complex criminal cases (mandatory for § crime (serious crimes) and optional for § délits (lesser crimes).) Directs the investigation and as such gives instructions to the police and gendarmes. Can put a person under investigation and place him under § contrôle judiciaire judicial supervision, or request that he be remanded in custody by the § juge des libertés et de la détention (JLD). Gathers evidence considered useful for establishing the truth, directs the interrogations, confrontations and hearings, and puts together the dossier that will be submitted to the § tribunal correctionnel (criminal court) or the § cour d'assise (court of assizes) for trial. The juge d'instruction handles about 2% of cases; the other 98% are under the § procureur.

juge du fond
judge dealing with law and fact; a court of first instance

jugement
a finding, ruling, or judgment; narrowly, a term for a decision by a court of first instance; more generally, a term for any decision by one or more judges. Compare: § arrêt, § décision de justice, § ordonnance, § relaxe. See also: § cour.

juger
to judge.
Usage notes:
- juger en connaissance de cause ⟶ make an informed decision.

juré
juror.
In other contexts: "sworn", from the past participle of jurer.

juridiction
The collective name for a court or judicial body.
False friend warning: this is *not* the same as the English term "jurisdiction", for which the French term is § compétence.

juridiction administrative
See § ordre administratif.

juridiction judiciaire
See § ordre judiciaire.

juridiction pénale
criminal court See also § ordre judiciaire.

juridiction répressive
criminal court See also § ordre judiciaire.

jurisprudence
case law

jury
jury. A jury is used only in the case of a § crime.

justice
The French judicial system comes down from the French Revolution of 1789, and is based on principles and on written law voted in § Parlement (French Parliament) by elected deputies and senators. The justice system depends on the Civil code, the Penal code and all laws, including European and international texts. The Constitution affirms the independence of the judiciary from the § pouvoir exécutif (lit. 'executive power'; Government) and from the § pouvoir législatif (lit. 'legislative power'; Parliament).
Usage note: saisir la justice ⟶ go to court, file a case, bring legal proceedings. See § saisir.

justice seigneuriale
Feudal manorial justice (justice seigneuriale) was a medieval mode of organization of the judicial system in most of Europe in the Middle Ages. Seigniorial courts in the kingdom of France numbered around 20,000 on the eve of the Revolution, and constituted the basis of judicial organization, along with the provosts' courts (prévôtés, subordinate royal courts) which were abolished in the middle of the eighteenth century.

justification
Justification. A criminal defense where the defendant claims to have done nothing wrong because the fact of committing the crime promoted some social interest or asserted a right of such importance as to outweigh any wrongfulness of the crime.
Usage note: fait justificatif ⟶ such a defense; justification; objective defense

=== KL ===
larcin
theft of low value
Etymological note:
- The English word larceny derives from the 13th century French larrecin or larcin meaning "theft, robbery".

légitime défense
A person is deemed to be acting in self-defense when they respond to an immediate and unjustified attack on their person, another person or their property, provided that the means of defense are proportional to the gravity of the attack. In this case, the person is not held criminally responsible for the harm that they may have caused in self-defense.

légitement
legally

lettre de remission
pardon

libération conditionnelle
A sentence adjustment, under the supervision of the § juge de l'application des peines (sentence enforcement judge), for convicts who show serious efforts at social rehabilitation. Similar to parole, or early release for good behavior.

libération sur parole
parole. A prisoner is paroled (French: libéré sur parole, lit. 'liberated on their word') when he is allowed to leave the place of detention under the sole condition of respecting certain commitments taken on honor. This term is mostly obsolete in modern France, except in some military contexts. It is similar to what is now called § libération conditionnelle.

liberté surveillée
a security measure taken against a juvenile offender who is placed under the supervision of an educator appointed by the juvenile judge.

libre arbitre
free will. A philosophical concept going back at least to Aristotle, and to Augustine in theological discussions about who has responsibility for evil acts. A person is said to have free will when they can, of their own volition, control their instincts and impulses, behave rationally, and act in accordance with moral and social laws. Classical criminological doctrine about guilt is based on this concept. From a legislative viewpoint, lawmakers generally presume that adults have free will, leaving it up to judges to determine how individual cases may depart from the general one. If they find that a § prévenu (accused) was under some irresistible constraint that deprived them of free will, a judge may declare them not responsible, given that there is a § cause de non-imputabilité. See moral responsibility, legal responsibility.

lien de causalité
causal link

lieu du crime
scene of the crime
Usage notes:
- se dépêcher sur les lieux ⟶ to hasten to the scene of a crime
- se transporter sur les lieux ⟶ to go to the scene of the crime

loi
legislation enacted by § Parliament. Contrast: § décret-loi, § décret.
A law. A written rule of general and impersonal scope. It applies to all without exception. It is discussed, drafted, amended and voted on by the Parlement (Assemblée nationale and Sénat) in identical versions. It is promulgated (officially declared and published) by the § Président de la République and published in the Journal officiel (JO). Once it has been promulgated, a loi is not subject to judicial review of its legality or constitutionality.
a law passed by the legislature in times of peace; Lois, § réglements, and § ordonnances are constitutionally defined. Lois are subdivided into three: 1) § lois constitutionelles, including the constitution itself; 2) § lois organiques-establishment, form and function of public powers, used to fill out the constitution but not amend it; and 3) § lois ordinaires, passed by national assembly and Senate, according to § article 34. See also § décret.
The word § loi is used to express written law, (the word législation exists but is less used); loi has a broad meaning, encompassing the Constitution, international treaties, administrative réglements (regulations), etc.; as well as a narrower sense equivalent to English statute, meaning a law passed by the legislature. Loi is distinguished from § régles by having three fundamental properties; they are: 1) general in nature; 2) abstract; and 3) permanent.
A statute; traditionally, it is any law voted on by Parliament. However, § Article 34 of the 1958 Constitution limited Parliament's powers, due to Parliamentary obstructionism in the Fourth Republic, to making laws which are particularly important in the way they affect the State or individuals; everything else is reserved to the government by § Article 37; these are known as § réglements autonomes, to distinguish them from réglements d'exécution des lois, to distinguish them from details about laws already passed by Parliament.
Since the 1958 Constitution, a statute is more constrained than it traditionally was, and Parliament's role is more constrained. Now, a statute must strictly conform to Article 34, otherwise it is within the purview of the government's regulatory power. In addition, where formerly statutes could not be reviewed once promulgated, the Conseil constitutionnel has chipped away at that in reforms since 1958 including establishing the § principes fondamentaux reconnus par les lois de la République including aggregating some power to itself which makes it a bit more analogous to the U.S. Supreme Court, whereas before 1958 Constitutions had less of a fundamental role in determining other laws because there had been so many of them. A fundamental difference between a statute and a regulation, is that a statute must be declared by the President of the Republic and published in the § Journal Officiel, and takes effect the next day.

loi d'habilitation
a new constitutional feature defined in § Article 38 of the 1958 Constitution. The loi d'habilitation is an enabling act in the form of a § loi (statute) which may be issued by § Parliament upon request of the government to temporarily delegate Parliament's constitutional law-making power to the government in a specifically defined subject area and for a specific length of time. While in effect, Parliament is blocked from issuing statutes in that area, and the government is permitted to draw up § ordonnances that normally would be beyond their remit. The ordonnance comes into effect immediately, but must be ratified by Parliament before the end of the period or it expires. Until ratification, the § ordonnance has the same status as a § réglement (regulation), and can therefore be challenged by the § Conseil d'État (Council of State); but after ratification, it takes on the same status as a statute (loi), and can no longer be challenged. In practice, there have been 23 such lois d'habilitation from 1960 to 1990, with effective periods from one month to three and a half years, resulting in 150 ordonnances; about a third of them are subsequently ratified by Parliament.

loi du talion
see § talion.

loi Guigou
see § loi sur la présomption d'innocence

loi ordinaire
a law second in importance, after § loi organique. An ordinary law voted on by Parliament regarding matters specifically ordained to it by the Constitution. See also: § ordonnance, § règlement.

loi organique
in the hierarchy of laws, this is the most important of three; a law relating to the Constitution. See also: § loi ordinaire, § ordonnance, § règlement.

loi sur la présomption d'innocence
a law of 15 June 2000 which modified the criminal procedure code to protect the rights of individuals under investigation. It also created the new judicial post of § juge des libertés et de la détention. It is mostly the creation of justice minister Élisabeth Guigou under the Jospin administration, and is also known as the loi Guigou. See also § présomption d'innocence.

=== M ===
magistrat
a career magistrate, who can be either a § magistrat debout (standing magistrate), i.e., the § parquet), or one of the sitting judges, either a § juge d'instruction or a trial judge.

magistrature assise
trial judge. Also: juge du siège; literally, the "sitting" judiciary.

magistrature debout
public prosecutors, collectively; branch of the judiciary which addresses the court on behalf of the § ministère public; literally, 'standing judiciary'. See also: § parquet.

magistrature du parquet
public prosecutor's office; the prosecution. See also § ministère public, § parquet, § procureur.

magistrat instructeur
See § juge d'instruction.

magistrat répressif
criminal court judge. See also: § répressif.

maison centrale
Prison for the most difficult convicts. The detention system is essentially focused on security.

maison d'arrêt
A detention center that receives convicts whose sentence or remaining sentence is two years or less.

maladresse
ineptitude

mandat
an act or warrant by which a magistrate (usually a § juge d'instruction) orders a person to be summoned, arrested, or detained.

- mandat d'amener – order given by a § juge d'instruction to any law enforcement officer to bring a person before them; including with the use of coercive measures if required. Order given by the § juge d'instruction (investigating judge) to the police or § gendarmerie to immediately bring a person under investigation before him, including by force.
- mandat d'arrêt – order given by a criminal court judge to any law enforcement officer to search for a person, arrest him or her and take him or her to a detention center
- mandat de comparution – notice to appear before a § juge d'instruction on a certain day and time. The decision of the § juge d'instruction (investigating judge) to give formal notice to an accused person (§ mise en examen) to appear before him. It is a written document delivered by a § huissier de justice (bailiff) or an § agent de la force publique (law enforcement officer).
- mandat de dépôt – Order given by a magistrate to the head or director of a penitentiary to receive, or to keep in detention, a person under investigation.
- mandat d'exécution – see § ordre d'exécution.
- mandat de perquisition – a "search warrant" does not exist in French law; this expression is only used when talking about foreign legal systems. Not to be confused with mandat de recherche.
- mandat de recherche – warrant which may be issued for a person for whom reasonable grounds exist that he may have committed an § infraction. It is the order given to § force publique (police) to search for the person in question and to take him into custody (placer en § garde à vue). added in 2004. Not to be confused with a "search warrant" in common law; see mandat de perquisition.

maniement juridique
judicial transfer

manoeuvre fraduleuse
fraudulent tactic

manquement a une obligation de prudence ou de sécurité
failure to fulfill an obligation of care or of security;

marque au fer rouge
Literally, 'branding with a red hot iron';branding. A type of corporal punishment under the Ancien régime. See § peine afflictive et infamante.

médiation pénale
an alternative measure to criminal proceedings. At the suggestion of the public prosecutor, it brings together the perpetrator and the victim of a criminal offense in the presence of a third party mediator authorized by the justice system. It consists of finding a freely negotiated solution and defining the terms of reparation.

mémoire
brief; Written document addressed to the Court of Cassation or to the administrative courts in which the parties set out their respective claims and arguments.

menace
threat

mesure de sûreté
When a person is dangerous, the judge may decide to apply a penal sanction of a preventive nature, such as therapeutic treatment or placement under mobile electronic surveillance. (See PSEM).

mettre en cause
call into question

meurtre
murder

milieu fermé
lit. "closed environment". In a criminal justice context, "closed custody", "secure unit".
That portion of the prison administration that deals with convicts who remain detained until their term expires. Contrast § milieu ouvert.
In the context of medical treatment: "in-patient"; in other contexts, a milieu fermé could be a ship, or a military regiment;

milieu ouvert
lit. "open environment". In a criminal justice context, "open custody", "non-custodial", "open institution".
That portion of the prison administration system that deals with penalties other than incarceration, such as community service (§ travail d'intérêt général), a citizenship course (§ stage de citoyenneté), work-release (§ semi-liberté), house detention with electronic surveillance (§ bracelet électronique), parole, and others. Contrast: § milieu fermé.
In the context of medical treatment: "out-patient".

mineur
minor

ministère publique
public prosecutor's office; the prosecution; see § magistrature du parquet, § parquet

minorité
The state of someone who is a § mineur (minor).

Ministère de la Justice
The Ministry of Justice is the ministry responsible for the administration of justice, and decides on reforms, and presents bills (§ projet de loi to Parliament. It defines criminal law policy in order to achieve equal treatment of citizens before the law, including monitoring public prosecutor's offices (§ Ministère public; § parquet), manages the courts, and appoints judicial officers—bailiffs (§ huissiers de Justice), notaries (notaires), solicitors (§ avoués), etc.

Ministère public
The ministère public, also known as the § parquet, is the authority which initiates § action publique (criminal proceedings) for § infractions (offenses) causing a disturbance to § ordre public (public order). It represents the interests of society before all courts of law.
The Public Prosecutor's Office. All magistrates working in the courts and tribunals of the § ordre judiciaire (judicial order), responsible for representing the interests of society and ensuring respect for public order and the application of the law. The § ministère public (Public Prosecutor's Office) is hierarchical (§ procureur général (public prosecutor), § procureur (public prosecutor), deputy public prosecutor (§ procureur-adjoint), vice-public prosecutor, and deputy public prosecutor) and subordinate to the Minister of Justice. It does not benefit from lifetime tenure. See § Procureur de la République, § Procureur général, § Poursuites (Prosecution).

mise en accusation
bring charges. A decision by the § juge d'instruction (investigating judge) or the investigating chamber to send a person § mise en examen (indicted) for a crime to the § cour d'assises for trial.

mise en danger deliberée de la personne d'autrui
deliberately putting someone in danger

mise en examen
A criminal charge against an accused (§ accusé) by the investigating judge § juge d'instruction that serious evidence exists making it probable that the accused may have participated, as perpetrator or accomplice, in the commission of an § infraction. Compare indictment. The term mise en examen replaced the earlier § inculpation in 1993.

mise en mouvement
set in motion; initiation; launch
la mise en mouvement de l'action publique ⟶ initiation of criminal proceedings.

mise en scène
scheming
Usage note: in other contexts (notably theater): "staging", "stage design"

motif
grounds, reason, motive for a judgment or judicial decision

mutilation
mutilation. A type of corporal punishment under the Ancien régime. See § peine afflictive et infamante.

=== N ===
non-imputabilité
absence of guilt. absence of criminal responsibility due to mental defect or duress. See also: § causes de non-imputabilité, § élément moral, § aliénation mentale partielle.

non-lieu
dismissal of a case by the § juge d'instruction. a decision that there is no case to answer; the abandonment of a judiciary action by a juge d'instruction when evidence from the § enquête (investigation) does not justify further action. See also: § classement sans suite, § opportunité des poursuites, § Irresponsabilité pénale) or when there is a justifying fact (e.g. § légitime défense).
Decision of an investigating court to put an end to criminal proceedings when it considers that an offense has not been established or that there is insufficient evidence against the perpetrator or accomplice of the offense; or when the accused is considered, for example, not to be criminally responsible at the time of the offense.

=== O ===
obligation de soins
court-ordered treatment. See § injonction thérapeutique.

officier ministériel
A person holding an office conferred by the State and appointed by the decision of a minister. Ministerial officers include: solicitors at the courts of appeal, the bailiffs (§ huissiers de justice), the notaries (notaires), and the lawyers at the Council of State and at the Court of Cassation. Some of them are also public officers (§ officier public).

officier public
Officers with the power to authenticate legal or judicial acts and to implement court decisions. Examples: notaries, bailiffs.

O.P.J.
officiers de police judiciaire. See § police judiciaire. See also: § agent de police judiciaire.

opportunité des poursuites
Prosecutorial discretion. The right of the § procureur Public Prosecutor's Office, when a criminal offense is reported to it, to initiate or not to initiate public proceedings according to the particularities of the case, according to article 40-1 of the Code of Criminal Procedure. Related terms: § classer sans suite, nolle prosequi. See also: § principe de legalité.

opposition
A civil or criminal remedy that allows people who have been judged by default to be tried again.

ordonnance
Multiple meanings, in different contexts:
- Under the Ancien Régime, a regulation issued by the king.
- In legislative context, a third category of law, defined by § Article 38 of the French Constitution of 1958, and sitting beside parliamentary § lois defined by § Article 34 and governmental § réglements (by § Article 37). This new type of law is called an ordonnance, and provides the government with temporary power to make law equal to a parliamentary § loi when specifically authorized by parliament to do so. See § loi d'habilitation. According to the § hierarchie des normes (hierarchy of norms), ordonnances sit at the same level as lois ordinaires and réglements.
- In legislative context, according to the § hierarchie des normes, the least important of three types of law. Compare: § arrêt, § décision de justice, § jugement, § relaxe. See also: § cour.
- In a judiciary context, in criminal law, a decision taken by a single judge, for example the § juge d'instruction, such as an order of release (ordonnance de mise en liberté) or an order of dismissal (ordonnance de non-lieu). (In civil law, the ordonnance is only provisional.)
Not to be confused with § ordonnance pénale (criminal ordinance).
In other contexts: many other meanings, including: a pharmaceutical prescription, and many others. See also: § loi organique, § loi ordinaire, § règlement.

ordonnance pénale
A simplified procedure for § contraventions (minor offenses) and certain § délits, particularly those related to automobile traffic. The § tribunal de police (police court) or the § tribunal correctionnel (criminal court) decides, by penal order whether or not to sentence the offender to a fine, or to certain penalties such as driving license suspension without the offender appearing in court. Not to be confused with § ordonnance.

ordre administratif
The administrative order of jurisdiction is one of the two orders of jurisdiction in French law (the other being the § ordre judiciaire–judicial order–and comprises administrative courts of first instance), administrative court of appeal, with the § Conseil d'État (Council of State) at the top. See also § dualisme juridictionnel.

ordre des avocats
bar association. Also known as barreau.

ordre judiciaire
The judicial order of jurisdiction is one of the two orders of jurisdiction (§ dualisme juridictionnel) in French law—the other being the § ordre administratif (administrative order)—and comprises courts of first instance (§ tribunal de police, § tribunal correctionnel, § cour d'assises), court of appeal, and § Cour de cassation at the top. See also § dualisme juridictionnel.

ordre public

'public policy' is a rough equivalent in English, but the term is more central in French law and used more widely, comprising issues like public order, public morality, and public interest. A set of rules governing life in society and enacted in the general interest. A rule is characterized as being about "public order" when it is mandatory and imposed for imperative reasons of protection, safety or morality. Persons may not transgress these rules in any way and may not exercise any rights which would otherwise be available to them if they violate them.
the social condition characterized by tranquility, public health, and safety. Syn.: paix publique. See the Preamble to the 1848 Constitution, point IV (in French, in English). See also: § police administrative.

;organ deliberant

decision-making body

organique
see § loi organique

ouï-dire
hearsay

=== P ===
parquet
The parquet is a collective term for § procureurs or the public prosecutor's office; the prosecution. It is a shorthand term used for § Ministère public.

partie civile
A civil plaintiff in a criminal proceeding. This is a person who considers himself to be the victim of an § infraction (offense) for which an § action publique (criminal proceeding) has been initiated in the criminal courts, and who wishes to obtain compensation for his loss. This is a specific type of procedure in which a criminal proceeding and an § partie civile (civil proceeding) are combined, namely when a criminal prosecution also has a civil portion involving damages attached to it.
This term also designates the procedure (the complaint by a civil party) allowing the victim to go either to the investigating judge or the competent court to obtain compensation.

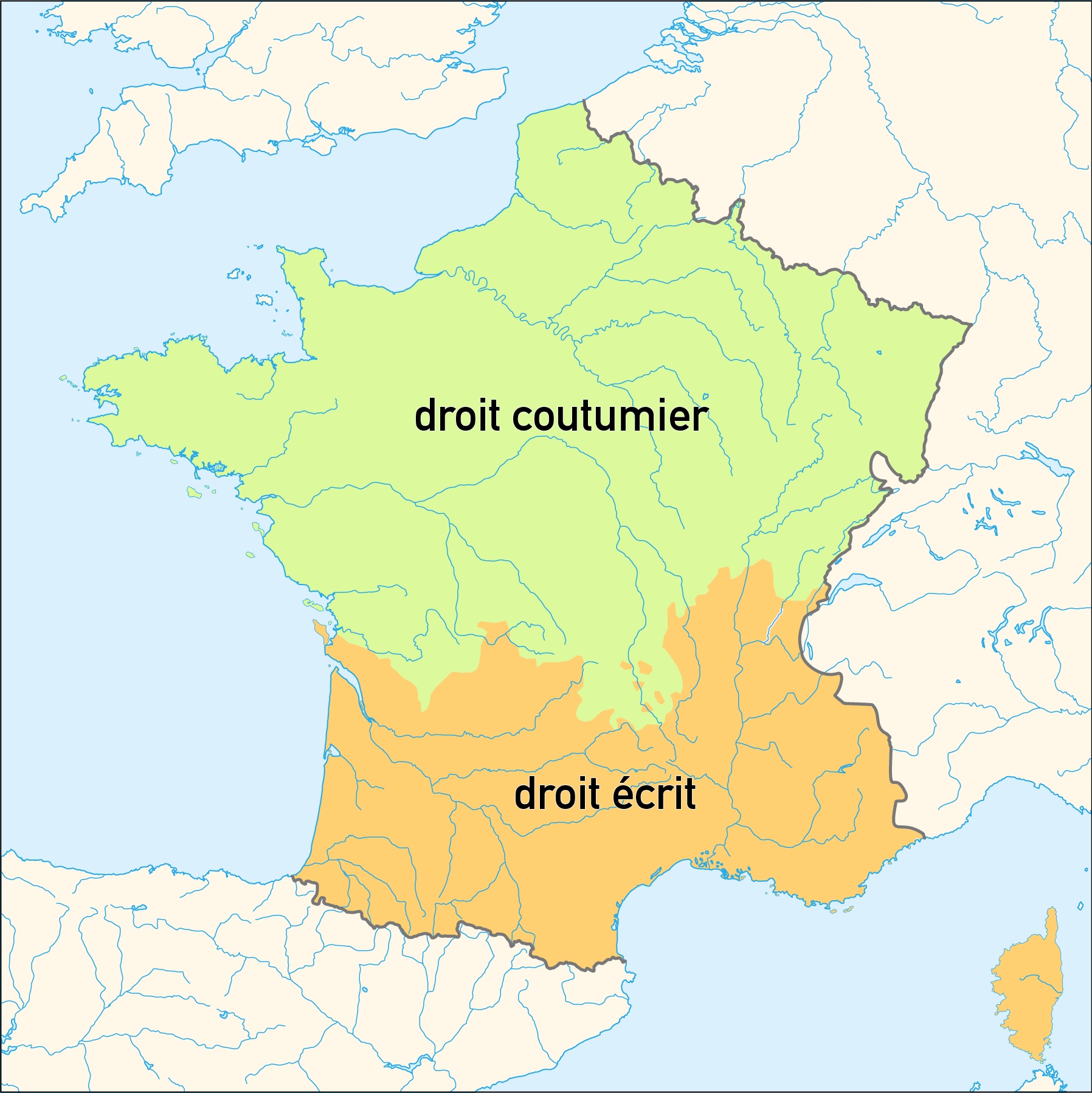
Zone of customary law in the north and written law in the south

pays de droit coutumier
the "land of customary law" (pays de droit coutumier) in the northern part of France (roughly north of the Loire) during the Middle Ages where the law depended chiefly on a version of laws of Germanic origin. Contrast § pays de droit écrit.

pays de droit écrit
the "land of written law" (pays de droit écrit) in the southern part of France (roughly south of the Loire) during the Middle Ages where the law depended chiefly on a version of Roman law. Contrast § pays de droit coutumier.

peine
the penalty or sanction imposed on the § auteur (perpetrator) of an § infraction (offense). They can be § peines criminelles (criminal penalties), or § peines correctionnelles correctional penalties.
peine accessoire
an additional penalty automatically added to the § peine principale (main sentence); it cannot be imposed on its own, except when it is pronounced in place of the main sentence; it automatically follows from the main sentence. Since 2005, peine accessoires are prohibited by article 132-17 of the penal code. Contrast § peine complémentaire.

peine afflictive et infamante
penal sanctions under the Ancien régime for punishing middle-level crimes not involving prison terms, and including § amende honorable (public confession), § pilori (pillory), § fouet (whipping), § flétrissure (branding), § galères (galleys), § mutilation, and § torture.
- peine afflictive (lit. 'afflictive punishment') – a punishment that targets the criminal in his person; originally corporal punishment (1501) but anything affecting the body including § réclusion, exile, or death.
a penal sanction pronounced to plunge the convicted person into pain and sadness. While the penal code of 1810 still used this term, the 1993 Code ignores it.
- peine infamante (lit. 'punishment of dishonor') - A punishment is considered to be § infamante (defamatory; degrading; dishonorable) when it is detrimental to the honor of the convicted person, and more precisely to the reputation he enjoys in society. Article 6 of the penal code of 1810 described banishment and degradation as simply dishonorable sentences. The current code does not use this term.

peine alternative
A judge may substitute an alternative to a prison sentence or fine, such as § bracelet électronique (electronic monitoring), § travaux d'intérêt général (community service), or § suivi socio-judiciaire (socio-judicial follow-up) prison sentence. Contrast § peine complémentaire.

peine complémentaire
an additional penalty added to the main sentence and not merely implied by it (as is the case with § peine accessoire) it reinforces the main sentence and can be optional or mandatory. It may apply to § crimes or § délits, and one or more additional penalties may be added to the main sentence. Contrast § peine accessoire.

peine contraventionnelle
a penalty for a § contravention committed by a § personne physique (natural person). The main penalties are fines up to E3,750, divided into five classes and can under certain circumstances be combined with § peines complémentaires. Penalties for a § personne morale (legal person) are different, mainly a five-fold increase in the fine for a natural person.

peine correctionnelle
a penalty for a § délit committed by a § personne physique (natural person). The main penalties are imprisonment for two months to ten years, and fines over E3,750. The chief § peines alternatives (alternative penalties) are § détention à domicile (house arrest) under § surveillance électronique (electronic surveillance). the § jour-amende (day-fine), a workshop (stage) in citizenship, traffic school, drug usage, etc. and certain other penalties restrictive of rights or freedom.

peine criminelle
a penalty for a § crime committed by a § personne physique (natural person). The main penalties are custodial sentences (peines privatives de liberté) Other possibilities are fines (amende), additional penalties (§ peines complémentaires). Other penalties are defined for offenses committed by § personnes morales (legal persons).

peine de stage
A designation for any of several workshops established by the law § Perben II or thereafter as an alternative sentence for someone convicted of a § délit (middle-level offense) in areas such as: safe driving, drugs, domestic violence, sex trafficking, parental responsibility, sexism and equality of women and men, and combatting animal cruelty. See § stage de citoyenneté, and § stage de formation civique.

peine principale
the main penalty of the § infraction (offense); it can be pronounced alone and must be expressly stated in the decision. For § personnes physiques (natural persons), the main penalties are imprisonment on an eight-step scale from two months to ten years and a fine greater than €3,750. See § peine complémentaire, § peine accessoire.

perquisition
An investigative measure that consists of searching for evidence of an offense, at a person's home or in any location where it may be found. In the context of a § enquête de flagrance investigation, the consent of the occupant and the decision of the § juge des libertés are not necessary; beyond that, the concept of a search warrant as used in U.S. or Canadian law does not exist in French law.

personnalisation des peines
See § individualisation des peines.

personnalité juridique
a legal person (human, or organization/business) having certain rights and obligations. Contrast English 'juridical person', which refers only to an organizational (non-human) entity; this latter English expression is represented in French by § personne morale or personnalité juridique morale. See § personne physique, § capacité juridique.

personne morale
A juridical person. An organization recognized as having a legal existence and that as such, holds rights and obligations (Example: a company, an association); Contrast: § personne physique (natural person).

personne physique
A natural person. A human being who is recognized as a § personnalité juridique (legal person), i.e., someone having the capacity to exercise a number of legal rights and to take legal action.

personne publique
A § personne morale (legal person) having a juridical status of § droit public conferred upon it by law. such as a municipality or a government department for example

personnification des entreprises
corporate personhood. See also: § personnalité juridique, § personne morale, § capacité juridique.

pièce à conviction
exhibit; evidence

pilori
Pillory. A type of public punishment under the Ancien régime. See § peine afflictive et infamante.

placement sous surveillance électronique (PSE)
Electronic surveillance, such as an electronic bracelet, is a method of enforcing a prison sentence outside of a prison establishment. The bracelet, most often attached to the ankle, is an electronic transmitter that makes it possible to detect, at a distance, the presence or absence of the convicted person in a place and for a period previously determined in the context of the sentence.

placement sous surveillance électronique mobile (PSEM)
A security measure that can be imposed for a period of two years as part of the § libération conditionnelle (conditional release) of a person sentenced to a long prison term for certain offenses. The § bracelet électronique (electronic bracelet), is generally worn on the ankle, and is supplemented by a GPS device. The device is managed by the prison administration and makes it possible to verify the person's location and that they respect the obligations and prohibitions set by judicial authorities. It promotes reintegration into society (§ réinsertion) by providing support and monitoring compliance with the obligations set by the § juge de l'application des peines (probation judge).

plaignant
complainant

plainte
a criminal complaint (or more broadly, outside of criminal law, a complaint).
In the broader sense, the act of reporting by a victim of an activity, state of affairs, or punishable behavior to an administrative, civil, criminal, or disciplinary authority. Contrast: § dénonciation.
Usage notes:
- § porter plainte – to bring a complaint
- déposer une plainte – to file a complaint
- plainte en escroquerie – fraud complaint
- retirer sa plainte – withdraw one's complaint

plainte contre X
a complaint against 'X'. See § plainte, and § X.

point d'honneur
any act or word that calls into question the honor of a person, to the point that he can not let the outrage go unpunished. In the past it was legitimate cause for a duel, but since dueling was prohibited, the sole arbiter for attacks on the moral integrity of a person is the courts.
Usage note (in other contexts):
- faire un point d'honneur [de] – to make a point of something.
- mettre un point d'honneur [à] – emphasize; be committed to, dedicated to, devoted to; put special care into; make a point of.

police administrative
police involved with prevention of crime (not part of criminal law). Contrast: § police judiciaire.

police judiciaire
Judicial police are police involved with criminal investigation. Officers of the judicial police (O.P.J.) may include: mayors and their assistants, officers of the gendarmerie, inspectors general, deputy directors of active police, controllers general, police commissioners and police officers; senior civil servants of the police nationale (national police force), and directors or deputy directors of the judicial police or the gendarmerie.

porter plainte
Literally: to bring a complaint (§ plainte). When notice of an § infraction (offense) is given to the police or to the § procureur (public prosecutor's office) by the victim of the offense, the term used is porter plainte. Compare: § dénoncer.

poursuite
prosecution, in the sense of poursuite judiciaire
Usage note: in other contexts, it means "pursuit", or "continuation" (non-legal sense).

pourvoi en cassation
to appeal to the § Cour de cassation or the § conseil d'Etat (Council of State).
cause de pourvoi ⟶ grounds for appeal
former un pourvoi ⟶ appeal; lodge an appeal; appeal against

pouvoir exécutif
the government; the executive branch of the government (lit. 'executive power') See also: § séparation des pouvoirs.

pouvoir judiciaire
(lit. 'judiciary power'), one of three branches of government. The judicial authority defined in the § Constitution of 1958. One of the three § pouvoirs publics (governmental authorities). See also: § séparation des pouvoirs.

pouvoir législatif
(lit. 'legislative power'), one of three branches of government. The legislative authority defined in the Constitution of 1958. One of the three § pouvoirs publics (governmental authorities). See also: § séparation des pouvoirs.

pouvoirs publics
all governmental authorities namely, the § pouvoir législatif (legislative authority), or branch, which makes the laws; the § pouvoir exécutif (executive authority) which executes them; and the § pouvoir judiciaire (judicial authority), which interprets them and punishes infractions. See also § séparation des pouvoirs (separation of powers).
informally: "the authorities".
There are several definitions which have evolved over time. The classic one, dating to Montesquieu, is the § séparation des pouvoirs (separation of powers) definition into three branches of governmental power or authority. In the 1958 Constitution, the pouvoirs publics are the institutions created or mentioned in the Constitution and established by law. Today, a broader conception of the term public authorities is used. It refers to all public authorities holding power, including local governments. This means that public authorities are involved in a wide range of economic and social fields, such as economic regulation and social protection. This extension of areas of intervention mainly benefits the executive branch (with, in particular, significant regulatory powers).

préjudice
injury; Damage to a person's property, body, feelings or honor. There are four types:
- préjudice d'agrément (of enjoyment) – : the damage that results, generally following a bodily injury, from the deprivation of the enjoyment of certain acts of everyday life, such as the exercise of an artistic activity, a leisure activity, or a sport.
- préjudice corporel (bodily injury) – injury to the health or physical or mental integrity of a person. Example: wound, infirmity.
- préjudice matériel (material damage) – Damage to property. Example: dégâts, damage, physical deterioration, loss of income.
- préjudice moral (emotional or psychological harm) – damage of a psychological nature. Example: suffering linked to the loss of a loved one.
In common speech, a synonym for dommage (damages; a term from civil law), but legally distinct.

prescription
limitation period; statute of limitations. Elapsed time after which no proceedings may be instituted against the § auteur (perpetrator) of an § infraction (offense): ten years for a § crime, three years for a § délit, and one year for a § contravention. Terms are longer for offenses against minors. Also known as prescription de l'action publique.

président
president.
chief justice; e.g., when speaking of the judge who presides over the § Cour d'assises.

présomption d'innocence
Presumption of innocence. Any person suspected of having committed an § infraction (offense), or under prosecution, shall be considered innocent of the acts of which he stands accused, as long as he has not been found guilty by the court with the appropriate jurisdiction (§ compétent) to judge him. See also article 9 of the Declaration of the Rights of Man and of the Citizen, and article 1 of the penal code. According to the European Convention on Human Rights, anyone accused of an § infraction is presumed to be without blame as long as his § culpabilité (guilt) hasn't been legally and definitively established.

prêter serment
to swear an oath. Syn.: assermentation.

prévenu
The accused person suspected or accused of an § infraction of a less serious type (i.e., § délit, § contravention). See also: § accusé, § auteur, § défendeur, § inculpé, § intimé.

preuves
Evidence. See also: § éléments de preuve, § saisie.

principe à valeur constitutionnelle
any principle identified by the Conseil constitutionnel (Constitutional Council (France)) as having constitutional force, and consequently binding on the legislature as well as on other institutions of state. See also § bloc de constitutionnalité.

principe de légalité
The principle of legality is one of the most fundamental principles of French criminal law and holds that no one may be convicted of a criminal offense without a prior published legal text describing the offense and the penalty. Latin: Nullum crimen, nulla pœna sine lege, lit. 'no crime, no penalty, without a law'.

principe d'opportunité des poursuites
See § opportunité des poursuites.

procédure accusatoire et contradictoire
The adversarial system (or, "adversarial law"), is a system of justice whose rules of procedure are based on the parties to the litigation. Thus, the lawyers for the plaintiff and defendant are responsible for presenting their version of the facts and convincing the judge or jury of the merits of their case. This is the system used in common law countries, but is not used in France. Contrast § procédure inquisitoire.

procédure d'irrecevabilité
procedure opposing legislation outside the remit of Parliament

procédure inquisitoire
Inquisitorial system. A legal system in which the court is actively involved in investigating the facts of the case. Contrast § procédure accusatoire et contradictoire.

procédure pénale
criminal procedure. Focuses on how individuals accused of crimes are dealt with in the criminal justice system: how people are investigated, prosecuted, tried, and punished. In France, these procedural issues are codified in the French code of criminal procedure (§ code de procédure pénale). Contrast § droit pénal (criminal law).

procés
trial

procès-verbal (PV)
In legal context: a legal act drawn up by a public official, usually a § greffier, that transcribes findings, statements, reports, or a situation. Examples: notes about an investigation, or a seizure)
In other contexts: minutes; record; transcript.

procureur de la République
senior public prosecutor

procureur général
public prosecutor

promulgation
promulgation; publication that brings into force

proxénétisme
procuring (prostitution). See § racolage.

=== Q ===
qualification judiciaire
Qualification judiciaire (lit.: 'judicial qualification') is a process of reasoning that seeks to establish that the particular acts which the suspect is accused of fall within the scope of a legal charge and therefore constitute a criminal offense which is within the jurisdiction of the criminal courts. The procedure consists of bridging the gap between the facts, and the law, to determine whether the de facto situation can be matched with some legal notion, and that the facts alleged by the prosecutor correspond in every respect to acts incriminated by the legislature.
Usage note: no established translation in English; terms seen include: penal qualification, penal categorization, penal status, to be criminal in nature, criminal qualification, classified as criminal, to be a matter for criminal law.

qualifié
"aggravating", when used with some crimes. The term crime qualifié or délit qualifié (roughly, "aggravated felony") is used to refer to an offense when there is an aggravating circumstance. Parricide, for example, is a felony murder; similarly, a vol qualifié (lit., "aggravated theft") is "armed robbery" or "aggravated robbery".
Usage notes:
In judgments by magistrates, the expression majorité qualifiée is used when a legislator requires a supermajority of 2/3.
In non-legal context, qualifié de means "characterized as" (or "by"), or "described as"; as a simple adj. or past participle, qualifié means "qualified", as in English.

quiconque
anyone who; everyone who; whoever. Used legally to emphasize that it applies to everyone, without exception. Judges use the term a lot for this reason, because it underlines the principle of § égalité devant la loi (equality before the law).

=== R ===
racolage
solicitation of prostitution abrogated by the law of 13 April 2016, which criminalized the clients of prostitution, and at the same time removed racolage from the criminal code. See § proxénétisme.

rappel à la loi
a warning; a reminder of the law as an alternative to prosecution. In the case of a minor infraction, the § ministère public (Public Prosecutor) can order a reminder of the law. The aim is to make the offender aware that they committed an illegal act, in order to prevent them from reoffending.

recel
concealment.

récidive
A previously convicted individual who commits, under certain conditions and within a certain period of time, a new offense that may result in a heavier sentence than usual. A repeat offender.

réclusion
imprisonment. See also § détention and § emprisonnement.

réclusion criminelle
imprisonment

réclusion criminelle à perpétuité
life imprisonment

reconnaissance préalable de culpabilité
See § comparution sur reconnaissance préalable de culpabilité.

recours
appeal. See also: § appel, § pourvoi.

régime
A term with a great many meanings in French; the nominal meaning is "the set of rules or factors that characterize the way something functions or runs", and derives from French regimen which goes back to 1285 with the meaning of "the action of governing or administrating". (Note: Definition II of régime: Façon de régir; ensemble de règles, de facteurs qui caractérisent le fonctionnement, le cours de quelque chose.CNRTL 2012, régime) and in this sense is similar to the English regimen.
Usage:
- Some examples are: régime matrimonial ("matrimonial regime"), régime parlementaire (parliamentary system), régime pénitentiaire ("prison system"; all the rules governing prison administration), régime de retraite ("pension plan"), régime de la sécurité sociale ("social security scheme"), and so on. When used to name a specific government or type of government, especially if there are negative connotations, English uses the cognate term: Régime de Vichy ("Vichy regime"), régime totalitaire ("totalitarian regime"), and similarly if the term is not translated: Ancien régime (English: "Ancien regime").

régime de semi-liberté
Work release program. See § semi-liberté.

réglementation
set of § règlements (regulations). Compare § loi, § ordonnance.

règlement
a regulation issued by the § pouvoir exécutif § pouvoir exécutif (government; executive branch). See also: § loi organique, § loi ordinaire. There are two types:
- § décret - issued by the Prime Minister or the President)
- § arrêté - issued by the executive branch members other than the President or Prime Minister, such as ministers, regional prefects, or mayors
Règlements are of a lower rank than a § loi, and may be annulled. But those règlements which fall into the domain defined by Article 37 of the Constitution are considered § règlements autonomes and not an adjunct to a particular loi. A règlement is of the same nature as a loi (i.e., abstract, general, and impersonal), but is one level lower in the § hiérarchie des normes (hierarchy of norms). Compare § loi, § ordonnance.
In other contexts: many other meanings, including "payment".

réhabilitation
A measure which erases a criminal conviction. It ends all forfeitures or limitations on the exercise of individual rights resulting from the conviction. It is acquired either after the expiration of the time limits prescribed by law, or by a decision of the investigating chamber in response to a request made by the convicted person.

relaxe
Decision of a § tribunal correctionnel (criminal court) or a § tribunal de police (police court) to declare a defendant not guilty either because he is innocent, or because there was a reasonable doubt. Also: § acquittement. Compare: § arrêt, § décision de justice, § jugement, § ordonnance. See also: § cour.

remettre en cause
See § mettre en cause.

remise
handing over

renvoi
Postponement of a hearing to another date.

répressif
The term French: droit répressif, lit. 'repressive law' is another term for criminal law. A {{Section link}}: required section parameter(s) missing is a court that deals with stopping ("repressing") criminal activity after it happens. Contrast with administrative law, tasked with preventing criminal activity, rather than cracking down on it. See also: § agent de répression, § service de répression.

réprimer
to incriminate

réquisitions
Written or oral conclusions taken in the interest of society that the public prosecutor presents before the criminal court to justify the guilt of a defendant and the sentence requested.

Usage note: Also used in forms of the verb requérir, such as requis: Le procureur a requis une peine de 1 an de prison avec sursis. ⟶ The prosecutor has requested a suspended sentence of 1 year in prison.

réquisitoire
a formal submission (by the prosecution)

réquisitoire introductif
application for judicial investigation One of the ways that the § procureur can initiate criminal proceedings (§ action publique), in particular, via § citation directe.
Written arguments by which the § ministère public (public prosecutor) asks the judge to apply the criminal law to a defendant or an accused person under investigation (mise en examen). See also § requete.

résolution de mise en accusation
decision to bring charges

responsabilité pénale
Criminal responsibility

ressort

1. the scope or extent of a court's jurisdiction in terms of the geography and nature of the disputes assigned to it by law. For example, the correctional court cannot try an offense committed outside its ressort and for which the perpetrator does not live in that region.
2. A court decision is said to be "en dernier ressort" (final) if it can no longer be appealed.

rétention de sûreté
detention of dangerous offenders beyond the term of their sentence.

rétroactivité
the characteristic of a legal norm that regulates situations that arose before its adoption.

révision
An appeal against a conviction that allows a case to be retried in light of new facts or elements unknown at the time of the initial trial that could rule out the guilt of the convicted person.

rogatoire
See § commission rogatoire.

ruse
fraud

=== S ===
saisie
(noun) seizure, e.g., as part of a search (§ perquisition) for evidence (§ preuves), under the supervision of an officer of the judicial police (§ officier de police judiciaire).

saisine
Submission of a request to a jurisdiction, requiring a response in the form of a decision. Can be formulated as a § citation, § requête, or declaration to a § greffe. Example: reporting a § flagrant délit (crime in progress).

saisir
In non-legal context, saisir simply means: "seize", "grab", "grasp".
In legal context, there are many meanings, such as "confiscate", which are directly related to the non-legal sense; these are straightforward, and not explained here. However, there is one sense of saisir in legal context that occurs frequently and has no universally accepted single translation in English; the rest of this entry concerns this sense, corresponding to CNRTL sense II., A (law), 2., and concerns a request made by an individual to an authority like a judge or a court to do something; or to refer a matter to a court.
The general form for this sense is: Person + saisit + Authority + Of (de, d'un, d'une) + Request, with these four parts:
1. subject: someone (a person, plaintiff, etc.) or institution who is the requester, i.e., the one who applies to or requests something (optional)
2. form of verb saisir (required)
3. object: someone or something in authority who may grant or act on a request: the judge, the court, the tribunal, etc. (required)
4. the request, usually as a prep. phrase with de, pour, etc. (optional)

Annotated examples:
- La mère saisit le juge d'une demande de garde concernant les quatre enfants.
  - The mother^{[subj]} applies to^{[saisit]} the court^{[obj]} for custody of all four children^{[request]}.

- Le parquet a saisi le juge d'instruction du premier cabinet pour qu'il instruise l'affaire et délivre un mandat de dépôt contre les inculpés.
  - The prosecutor^{[subj]} instructed^{[saisit]} the examining magistrate of the first chamber^{[obj]} to investigate the case^{[request-1]} and issue arrest warrants for the accused^{[request-2]}.

How to translate saisir depends a lot on context, and may use terms like "apply to", "take to", "go to", "bring before", "approach", "request", "refer to", "submit", or other expressions, and the word order in English may be different:
- saisir le juge aux affaires familiales ⟶ refer the matter to the judge for family affairs
- le droit constitutionnel de saisir le juge ⟶ the constitutional right to go to court
- il était loisible de saisir le juge ⟶ it was possible to bring the case before the judge
- saisir le Tribunal d'une ordonnance de cesser et de s'abstenir ⟶ bring a cease and desist order before the Court
- Toute personne qui objecte à cette ordonnance peut saisir le tribunal. ⟶ Anyone who objects to the order has recourse to the court.
- Le médiateur peut également saisir le Tribunal constitutionnel ⟶ The Ombudsman can also submit cases to the Constitutional Court.
- Les travailleurs victimes de discrimination peuvent saisir le tribunal de travail ⟶ Workers who are victims of discrimination may apply to the Labor Tribunal.

In the passive, the pattern uses the participial form saisi and inverted word order, often with optional parts missing:
- le juge saisi de l'affaire ⟶ (lit.) "the judge applied to/requested [by someone] regarding the case", or in more usual English word order: "the judge handling the case", "...on the case", or "...assigned to the case"
- la décision du juge saisi de la requête ⟶ the judge for the motion

There is no exact translation for saisit (or in past participle form, saisi) in English, and how it appears in English translation is highly variable, and depends on the context (and the translator). Sometimes the best translation involves leaving the word out entirely. Also, the order of the elements is not always the same, and the request often comes before the authority-object.

- ANF avait saisi le Juge d'Instruction de Marseille d'une plainte avec constitution de partie civile concernant des faits supposés par l'ancien fournisseur... ⟶ ANF^{[subj]} had filed^{[saisir]} a complaint^{[request]} with the Marseilles investigating magistrate^{[obj]} bringing civil action against alleged acts committed by the supplier...

The request can be omitted, so just the subject, verb saisir, and object are present. In the abstract, the subject may be omitted:
- Saisir le tribunal; saisir la justice. ⟶ Going to^{[saisir]} court^{[obj]}; seeking^{[saisir]} justice^{[obj]}. Other translations include: bring legal proceedings, initiate a court case, file a case, go to court, refer [the case] to court.

Usage notes:
The form saisi des faits is often seen, and translation depends on context. The word faits means "facts", and depending on whether "saisi des faits" is a syntactic constituent in the sentence, the word "facts" may or may not appear in English translation. A literal translation of the passive construction might be: "[an authority] who had been applied to [by someone, unstated] with the facts [of an unstated (legal) request]"; but in free translation, this might come out simply as "[the judge] on the case", and may be expressed very differently in specific contexts. Some examples:
- La cause peut alors être entendue par un tribunal de compétence provinciale, qui est saisi des faits par un procureur de la Couronne.
  ⟶ The case would then proceed within the provincial jurisdiction to a crown attorney, who takes the facts to court.
- En d'autres termes, [il] doit être saisi et considérer des faits nouveaux ou contestés pour confirmer une décision effective au client.
  ⟶ In other words, [he] must be involved and must consider new or contested facts in order to confirm an actual ruling to the client. Note: not a syntactic constituent; must use the word facts here.
- il se peut qu'il en arriverait à une conclusion différente s'il était saisi des mêmes faits aujourd'hui.
  ⟶ if the same facts were before it today, with that Code available to it as an adjudicative tool, it might arrive at a different conclusion. Not a constituent.
- Le procureur européen, informé ou saisi de l'ensemble des faits, ne poursuivrait alors qu'au titre de l'infraction communautaire...
  ⟶ The European Public Prosecutor, receiving information or a referral, would prosecute only the Community offence...

sanction pénale
criminal sanctions; sentence; penalty.

sanction-réparation
A "reparation sanction": is an alternative sentence which obliges the perpetrator to repair the damage caused to the victim through financial compensation or reparation in kind.

scellés
1. an order that evidence be placed under seal. Also refers to the practice of a wax seal to an item.
Usage notes: in legal terminology, almost always plural. In the singular, it refers to the sealing material itself, such as wax.
- placé sous scellé ⟶ placed under seal
2. The part of the § greffe (judicial registry) where evidence is stored.
3. Other meanings apply in civil law, having to do with sealing off buildings, rooms, etc. Breaking such a seal duly placed by civil authorities is punishable under criminal law.

sciemment
knowingly

semi-liberté
work release; day parole; lit: 'semi-freedom'. A criminal sanctions program that authorizes a convicted person to carry out activity outside the prison, which may be professional activity, training, internship, or medical treatment. At the end of each day, the convict returns to the detention center. See also: § centre de semi-liberté.
Usage note: often seen in the expression, § régime de semi-liberté.

séparation des pouvoirs
The separation of powers is the constitutional principle of the separation of § pouvoirs publics (governmental authorities; lit. 'public powers') into three branches: legislative (§ pouvoir législatif), executive (§ pouvoir exécutif), and judicial (§ pouvoir judiciaire), a principle dating to Montesquieu and John Locke, with forerunners in ancient Greek and Roman philosophy and government.

service de répression
law enforcement agency. See § répression.

signification
An act by which a party brings to the attention of his adversary an act or a decision of justice by means of a § huissier de justice (judicial officer).

soustraction
appropriation

stage de citoyenneté
A citizenship workshop. An alternative sentence for someone convicted of a § délit (middle-level offense) which provides for completing a citizenship workshop, in lieu of prison time. Other laws introduced from 2004 to 2021 introduced training workshops in other domains; collectively these became known as a § peine de stage (workshop sentence). Introduced as part of the law 2004-204 of 9 March 2004, better known as the § loi Perben II.

stage de formation civique
A civic education training workshop is an educational measure aimed at reminding minors of the obligations resulting from the law, as well as making them aware of civil and criminal responsibilities and the duties involved in living in society. The minor is reminded of all these notions during short group training sessions relating to social organization or civic values for a duration not to exceed 30 hours.

stupéfiant
drug See also § cession de stupéfiants

suivi judiciaire
See § suivi socio-judiciaire.

suivi socio-judiciaire
Socio-judicial supervision is a measure pronounced by the § tribunal correctionnel (criminal court) or the § cour d'assizes against the perpetrator of a § crime or § délit (major or serious offense) of a sexual nature. This measure allows for judicial and optionally also medical follow-up after the prison sentence has been served. It forces the convicted person to submit, under the supervision of the § juge de l'application des peines to measures of surveillance and assistance as well as to certain obligations, such as the prohibition on going to certain places, or to be around minors. Failure to comply is grounds for reimprisonment. May also be a stand-alone sentence. No universally recognized term in English; some terms seen are: socio-judicial surveillance, socio-judicial supervision, or probation. See also: § peine alternative.

supplice
torture

sur le fond
See § fond.

sur le forme
See § forme.

sursis
simple suspended sentence
Usage note:
sursis avec mise à l'épreuve: suspended sentence with certain conditions such as geographic restrictions or interaction restrictions

surveillance
supervision

surveillance électronique
A § peine alternative (alternative penalty) such as a § bracelet électronique; See § placement sous surveillance électronique.

=== T ===
talion, loi du
law of retaliation Originally, and dating to the Code of Hammurabi, it restricts a victim from taking vengeance in a disproportionate manner; "an eye for an eye".

témoin
witness

témoin assisté
represented witness
an intermediate witness status, between that of a simple § témoin (witness) and someone § mis en examen (criminally charged); introduced in 1987, later included in the § loi sur la présomption d'innocence. This is a person who is listed as a witness, but at the same time is named either in the § réquisitoire introductif or in the initial complaint by the victim. Because of their status as a possible suspect, the law requires them to be heard only in presence of their lawyer.
A person who is the subject of a complaint, accused or prosecuted by the § Parquet (Public Prosecutor's Office), against whom there are some clues (insufficient for an indictment) that make it likely that he or she has committed a crime or an offense. His lawyer has access to the case file. When heard by the investigating judge, the assisted witness may ask to be confronted with the person or persons implicating him. If the judge considers that the witness should be placed under judicial supervision or in pre-trial detention, or be referred to the criminal court or the assize court to be tried, he or she will then proceed with the examination.

témoin instrumentaire
a legal witness; a witness required for the official recording of certain transactions.

tentative
attempt
A § crime or § délit interrupted in act by an event beyond the control of its perpetrator. The attempt is punishable by the same penalties as if the offense had been fully carried out.
Usage notes:
- tentative achevée ⟶ failed attempt
- tentative stérile ⟶ failed attempt

torture
torture. A type of punishment used in the Ancien régime. See also: § supplice, § peine afflictive et infamante.

travail d'intérêt général (TIG)
community service; carrying out unpaid work, within a specified time, for the benefit of a public body or an approved association, as part of a sentence by an adult or juvenile court. One of several alternative penalties that are sometimes ordered instead of incarceration.

travaux forcés
Penal labor; forced labor as a judicial punishment.

tribunal
court; a court composed of one or more judges, charged with settling disputes and rendering a § décision de justice (legal judgment).

tribunal correctionnel
a court of first instance, responsible for judging § délits (major offenses). If necessary, it rules on the request for compensation made by the victim (called the § partie civile (civil party))

tribunal de grande instance (TGI)
a court having general jurisdiction in civil matters.

tribunal de police
a court that tries minor offenses; a court of first instance, ruling with a single judge. It judges 5th class offenses. The police court is the criminal court of the § tribunal d'instance (district court).

tribunal des conflits
A high jurisdiction made up equally of magistrates from the § ordre administratifand § ordre judiciaire (administrative and judicial orders), whose mission is to resolve conflicts of jurisdiction between the courts of the judicial order and those of the administrative order. For example: these two orders claim to be simultaneously competent or incompetent for the same case.

tribunal répressif
criminal court. See § repressif.

trouble neuropsychique
neuro-psychological illness

trouble psychique
psychological illness

tuer
to kill See § homicide.

=== UV ===
valeur constitutionnelle
See § principe à valeur constitutionnelle.

verdict
A solemn declaration by which the magistrates and § juré (jurors) of the § cour d'assises answer the question of the guilt of a defendant, and set the sentence, if any. The verdict can be an § acquittement (acquittal), or a § condamnation (guilty verdict).

victime
victim. A person who personally and directly suffers a physical, moral or material § préjudice (injury).

viol
rape; In the classic sense, rape consists in the fact of a man having a carnal relationship with a non-consenting woman, or in circumstances where she cannot manifest her § volonté (will).

violation
breach; violation. In the former sense, compare § effraction. In the latter sense, can be a synonym for § infraction (offense).

violer
to breach; to rape.

visite domiciliaire
house search

voie de fait
offense of violence
Note: has an entirely different meaning in administrative law.

vol
theft

volontairement
intentionally

volonté
will; In criminal law, volonté (will) is a firm and definite determination in a person's mind to do something that will have an effect in the outside world. The term § intention indicates the purpose for which the will is directed.

=== WXYZ ===
X
X represents an unknown person, a 'John Doe', used in a criminal complaint when the name of the person is not known. Compare § condamnation par défaut.
Usage note: plainte contre X ⟶ a complaint against 'X'. Analogous to a "John Doe defendant", or a John Doe lawsuit.

== See also ==
- Administrative police (France)
- Glossary of Brazil investigative terms
- Glossary of the French Revolution
- Glossary of law
- Judiciary of France#Glossary
- Legal history of France
- Translating "law" to other European languages

== Works cited ==
- Bindreiter, Uta (31 December 2002). Why Grundnorm?: A Treatise on the Implications of Kelsen's Doctrine. Springer Science & Business Media. pp. 11–. ISBN 978-90-411-1867-7. OCLC 1120367947.
- Beaudoin, Franck (15 October 2021). "French law: quick overview".
- John Bell; Sophie Boyron; Simon Whittaker (27 March 2008). Principles of French Law (2 ed.). OUP Oxford. ISBN 978-0-19-101889-3. OCLC 865331945.
- Bermann, George A.; Picard, Etienne, eds. (1 January 2008). Introduction to French Law. Kluwer Law. ISBN 978-90-411-2466-1. OCLC 219574344.
- Bridge, F. H. S.; Council of Europe (1 January 1994). The Council of Europe French-English Legal Dictionary. Council of Europe. ISBN 9789287124968. OCLC 1232989547.
- Bouscau, Franck (1 October 2011). "Les lois fondamentales du Royaume de France : genèse de l'institution royale" [The Fundamental Laws of the Kingdom of France: genesis of the royal institution]. Vive le Roy (in French).
- Cairns, Walter; McKeon, Robert C.; McKeon, Robert (1995). Introduction to French Law. Cavendish. ISBN 978-1-85941-112-4. OCLC 246842627.
- Champion, Dean J. (2008). Sentencing: A Reference Handbook. ABC-CLIO. ISBN 978-1-59884-087-2. OCLC 1151269945.
- Doucet, Jean-Paul, ed. (2016) [1st pub. Le Moniteur Universel:1808]. "Code d'instruction criminelle de 1808, Deuxième partie, Livre II - de la justice" [1808 Code of Criminal Procedure, Part II, Book II - Justice]. Le droit criminel (in French).
- "Centre National de Ressources Textuelles et Lexicales" [National Center of Textual and Lexical Resources]. CNRTL.fr (in French). 2012.
- Dadomo, Christian; Farran, Susan (1996) [1st pub. 1993]. The French legal system (2nd ed.). London: Sweet & Maxwell. ISBN 0-421-53970-4.
- "Action publique - Fiches d'orientation" [Action publique - Fact sheets]. Dalloz (in French). Paris: Editions Dalloz. "L'action publique est l'action en justice portée devant une juridiction répressive pour l'application des peines à l'auteur d'une infraction. Même si elle peut être mise en mouvement par la partie civile, elle est toujours exercée par les magistrats ou par les fonctionnaires auxquels elle est confiée par la loi." [Action publique is the legal action brought before a criminal court for the application of penalties to the perpetrator of an offense. It may also be initiated by a civil party to a criminal case, but it is always exercised by the magistrates or by the civil servants to whom it is entrusted by law.]
- "Élément matériel de l'infraction - Fiches d'orientation" [Material element of the infraction - Fact sheets]. Dalloz (in French). Paris: Editions Dalloz.
- "Élément moral de l'infraction - Fiches d'orientation" [Moral element of the infraction - Fact sheets]. Dalloz (in French). Paris: Editions Dalloz. July 2021.
- "Présomption d'innocence - Fiches d'orientation" [Presumption of innocence - Fact sheets]. Dalloz (in French). Paris: Editions Dalloz. August 2022.
- "Peines - Fiches d'orientation" [Penalties - Fact sheets]. Dalloz (in French). Paris: Editions Dalloz. September 2022.
- "Principe à valeur constitutionnelle - Fiches d'orientation" [Principle of constitutional force - Fact sheets]. Dalloz (in French). Paris: Editions Dalloz. May 2022. "Un principe à valeur constitutionnelle est un principe dégagé par le Conseil constitutionnel et dont le respect s'impose au législateur comme aux autres organes de l'État. Il est une norme juridique à part entière." [A principle of constitutional force is a principle identified by the Constitutional Council, the respect of which is binding on the legislator as well as on the other organs of the State. It is a legal norm in its own right.]
- "Application de la loi pénale dans le temps | Fiches d'orientation" [Application of the law in time | Fact sheet]. Dalloz (in French). Paris: Editions Dalloz. 2 September 2021. "La question de l'application de la loi pénale dans le temps se pose dès lors que des faits ont été commis et n'ont pas encore été définitivement jugés lors de l'entrée en vigueur d'une loi nouvelle." [The question of the application of criminal law with respect to time arises when acts have been committed and have not yet been finally judged when a new law comes into force.]
- Dammer, Harry R.; Albanese, Jay S. (4 January 2013). Comparative Criminal Justice Systems (5 ed.). Cengage Learning. pp. 149–. ISBN 978-1-285-63077-9. OCLC 828929176.
- Delmas-Marty, Mireille; Spencer, J. R., eds. (17 October 2002). European Criminal Procedures. Cambridge University Press. ISBN 978-0-521-59110-2. OCLC 1025272735.
- de Noblet, Christel (2004). French legal methodology. Leicester, U.K.: Institute of Art and Law. ISBN 9781903987049. OCLC 74813080.
- Dickson, Brice; Hübner, Ulrich (1994). Introduction to French law. London: Pitman. ISBN 9780273601401. OCLC 3479836.
- Direction de l'information légale et administrative [in French] (25 February 2025). "Perquisition". Service-Public.fr. DILA.
- Dongois, Nathalie (15 January 2010) [2008:Temple]. "Wrongful Convictions in France: The Limits of "Pourvoi en Revision"". In C. Ronald Huff; Martin Killias (eds.). Wrongful Conviction: International Perspectives on Miscarriages of Justice. Temple University Press. p. 251. ISBN 978-1-59213-646-9. OCLC 502419498.
- Doucet, Jean-Paul (11 April 2019). "Dictionnaire de droit criminel" [Dictionary of Criminal Law] (in French). Archived from the original on 7 January 2023.
- Duroché, Jean-Philippe; Pedron, Pierre (2019). Droit pénitentiaire [Penitentiary law] (4 ed.). Paris: Vuibert. ISBN 978-2-311-40062-5. OCLC 1127907672.
- Elliott, Catherine (2001). French Criminal Law. Portland OR: Willan. ISBN 978-1-135-99307-8. OCLC 49494876.
- Elliott, Catherine; Jeanpierre, Eric; Vernon, Catherine (2006). French Legal System (Second ed.). Harlow, England: Pearson/Longman. ISBN 978-1-4058-1161-3. OCLC 70107160.
- Garé, Thierry; Ginestet, Catherine (September 2022). Droit pénal. Procédure pénale 2023 [Criminal law. criminal procedure 2023]. HyperCours (in French) (14 ed.). Paris: Editions Dalloz. ISBN 978-2-247-22075-5. OCLC 1346591522. p. pub. blurb: "Le droit pénal général étudie les principes généraux de la répression des infractions, la responsabilité et la peine. La procédure pénale régit le déroulement du procès pénal. Ces droits doivent assurer à la société une protection suffisante, sans sacrifier les libertés individuelles." [General criminal law deals with the general principles of punishment, liability and sentencing. Criminal procedure governs the conduct of criminal trials.]
- Hodgson, Jacqueline (8 November 2005). French Criminal Justice: A Comparative Account of the Investigation and Prosecution of Crime in France. Bloomsbury Publishing. ISBN 978-1-84731-069-9. OCLC 1048749661.
- Hodgson, Jacqueline; Soubise, Laurène (21 June 2016). "Understanding the sentencing process in France". Crime and Justice. 45 (1). Univ. of Chicago: 221–265. doi:10.1086/685538. ISSN 0192-3234. OCLC 6914375713.
- Isom, David (16 November 2022), Legal System - French Legal Research Guide - Guides at Georgetown Law Library, Georgetown Law Library see 'loi'
- Jurgens, Erik (6 July 2007). The principle of the Rule of Law (Report). Council of Europe. 11343.
- French Ministry of Justice (2023). "Lexique | Justice.fr" [Glossary | Justice.fr]. Ministère de la Justice (in French).
- Kock, Gerald L.; Frase, Richard S. (1988). The French code of criminal procedure. American series of foreign penal codes, 29 (revised ed.). Littleton, Colo: F.B. Rothman. ISBN 9780837700496. OCLC 1080434512.
- "Dictionnaire Français en ligne - Larousse". Larousse.fr. Paris: Éditions Larousse.
- République française; Secrétariat général du gouvernement (19 October 2022). "Légifrance Le service public de la diffusion du droit" [The public service for dissemination of the law]. Légifrance. Direction de l'information légale et administrative. ISSN 2270-8987. OCLC 867599055.
- Laronde-Clérac, Céline (2021). Procédure pénale. Spécial droit (in French). Paris: Ellipses. ISBN 9782340058330. OCLC 1268488252.
- "Linguee | Dictionnaire anglais-français (et autres langues)" [Linguee English-French Dictionary (and other languages)]. Linguee.fr. Cologne: DeepL SE. 2023.
- Jacopin, Sylvain (2021). "Fiche 1. La définition légale de l'infraction" [Sheet 1. The legal definition of an offense]. In Jacopin, Sylvain (ed.). Droit pénal général [General criminal law]. Tout-en-un droit (in French). Paris: Ellipses. pp. 59–109. ISBN 978-2-340-05703-6. OCLC 1269458347.
- French Ministry of Justice (16 December 2008). "Les acteurs de la justice pénale" [Participants in the criminal justice system]. Ministère de la Justice (in French).
- French Ministry of Justice (9 December 2008). "Justice | Portail | La garde à vue" [Justice | Portal | Police custody]. Ministère de la Justice (in French). [Police custody is the situation in which a person, suspected of having committed or attempted to commit an offense punishable by imprisonment, is held by the police or gendarmerie as part of a judicial investigation. It is a measure that deprives a person of liberty for a strictly limited period of time.]
- French Ministry of Justice (4 December 2008). "L'infraction". Ministère de la Justice (in French). Archived from the original on 31 May 2023.
- French Ministry of Justice (15 September 2021). "L'organisation de la justice en France" [Organization of justice in France]. Ministère de la Justice (in French). "Les juridictions françaises se répartissent en deux ordres : un ordre judiciaire et un ordre administratif. Les juridictions de l'ordre judiciaire sont compétentes pour régler les litiges opposant les personnes privées et pour sanctionner les auteurs d'infractions aux lois pénales. ... Les juridictions de l'ordre administratif sont compétentes dès qu'une personne publique est en cause (une municipalité ou un service de l'État par exemple)." [The French courts are divided into two orders: a judicial order and an administrative order. The courts of the judicial order are responsible for settling disputes between private individuals and for punishing the perpetrators of criminal offenses. ... The administrative courts have jurisdiction as soon as a public entity is involved (a municipality or a government department for example).]
- French Ministry of Justice (6 August 2008). "Les mots-clés de la Justice - Lexique" [Key words of Justice - Lexicon]. Ministère de la Justice (in French). Archived from the original on 31 March 2023.
- Merle, Roger; Vitu, André (1984). Traité de droit criminel. Vol. 1 (5 ed.). Paris: Cujas. no. 146. ISBN 9788792002754. OCLC 263103447. "l'ensemble des régles juridiques qui organisent la réaction de l'État vis-a-vis des infractions et des délinquants" [the set of legal rules that govern the State's response to offenses and offenders]
- Newman, Graeme R., ed. (19 October 2010). Crime and Punishment around the World [4 volumes]: [Four Volumes]. ABC-CLIO. pp. 147–. ISBN 978-0-313-35134-1. OCLC 1010964660.
- French Ministry of Justice (15 December 2008). "L'appel" [Appeal]. Ministère de la Justice (in French). Archived from the original on 5 January 2023.
- Ministère de la Justice (April 2001). "Bulletin Officiel du ministère de la Justice n° 80 (1er octobre - 31 décembre 2000)" [Official bulletin of the ministry of Justice #80 (1 October - 31 December 2000)] (in French). Archived from the original on 22 January 2023.
- French Ministry of Justice (29 June 2010). "Justice / Portail / Les fondements et principes".
- French Ministry of Justice (3 January 2013). "Justice in France".
- French Ministry of Justice (11 July 2011). "Justice / Métiers et concours / Le juge de l'application des peines" [Justice / Professions and competitions / Sentencing judge]. Ministère de la Justice (in French).
- French Ministry of Justice (11 July 2011). "Justice / Métiers et concours / Le juge des libertés et de la détention" [Justice / Professions and competitions / Investigating judge]. Ministère de la Justice (in French).
- French Ministry of Justice (2 January 2015). "Justice / Métiers et concours / Juge d'instruction" [Justice / Professions and competitions / Investigating judge]. Ministère de la Justice (in French).
- Meijer, Sonja; Annison, Harry; O'Loughlin, Ailbhe, eds. (27 June 2019). Fundamental Rights and Legal Consequences of Criminal Conviction. Bloomsbury Publishing. ISBN 978-1-5099-2098-3.
- Sauvé, Jean-Marc (28 September 2016). "Le dualisme juridictionnel : synergies et complémentarité" [Jurisdictional dualism: synergies and complementarity] (in French). Conseil d'État.
- Steiner, Eva (4 March 2010). French Law: A Comparative Approach. OUP Oxford. ISBN 978-0-19-923237-6.
- "France, French Penal Code of 1994 as Amended as of January 1, 1999". American Series of Foreign Penal Codes. 31. Translated by Tomlinson, Edward A. Littleton, Colorado: F. B. Rothman. 1999. ISSN 0066-0051. OCLC 1480723 – via HeinOnline.
- Tomlinson. "Translator's Preface". In Tomlinson (1999), p. xxi–xxii.
- Tomlinson. Introduction. In Tomlinson (1999), p. 1–28.
- Tomlinson. "Book I General Provisions". In Tomlinson (1999), p. 29–88.
- Tomlinson. "Book II Felonies and Misdemeanors against the Person". In Tomlinson (1999), p. 89–160.
- Tomlinson. "Book III Felonies and Misdemeanors against Property". In Tomlinson (1999), p. 161–196.
- Tomlinson. "Book IV Felonies and Misdemeanors against the Nation, the State, and the Public Peace". In Tomlinson (1999), p. 197–268.
- Tomlinson. "Book V Other Felonies and Misdemeanors". In Tomlinson (1999), p. 269–.

- Webclass (1 December 2024) [29 August 2013]. "Pouvoirs publics". SES.Webclass (in French). Lyon: Frédéric Dussuchalle.
