= Fictitious =

Fictitious may refer to:

- Fictitious defendants
- Fictitious business name
- Feigned action
- Ejectment, an action to recover land
- John Doe, commonly named as a fictitious defendant

== See also ==
- Fiction, in literary uses
- Legal fiction, in legal uses
