= Jurisdictional dualism in France =

Division of judicial power in France

Jurisdictional dualism in France is the separation of the French court system into two separate divisions, or "ordres", as they are called in French: the ordinary courts (ordre judiciaire), and the administrative courts (ordre administratif). The ordinary courts, also known as the judiciary order, handle criminal and civil cases, while the administrative courts handle disputes between individuals and the government. This dual system allows for a clear separation of powers and specialized handling of cases related to the actions of the government. The administrative courts are headed by the Council of State, and the ordinary courts by the Court of Cassation for judiciary law.

== Introduction ==
Schema showing jurisdictional dualism in the French legal system

The separation of public law (administrative) and private law (judiciary) goes back to Roman law. A separate branch for public law existed during the Ancien régime. Many other countries have such a system (including in common-law countries) not only in having a separate judicial order for administrative courts (which exist also in Germany, for example, with Article 95 of the Basic Law of Germany). However, France is exceptional in this regard because of the position of the administrative judge in being superior to the administration, and because administrative law is largely unwritten, and established mostly by administrative judicial jurisprudence. That is, administrative law derives largely from case law written by administrative judges, and not by laws passed by the legislature.

In the case of the judiciary order, codes are established by the legislature and open to all, (Note: Open to all: in recent years, legal codes are freely available online in the form of the Légifrance website established by the French government, according to law.) but as administrative law is result of jurisprudence and uncodified, it is not discussed in Parliament, not published in the Journal Officiel, and hidden from the public.

When there is a potential conflict of jurisdiction between courts of the administrative order and courts of the judiciary order, this is handled by the Tribunal des conflits.

== Judiciary order ==
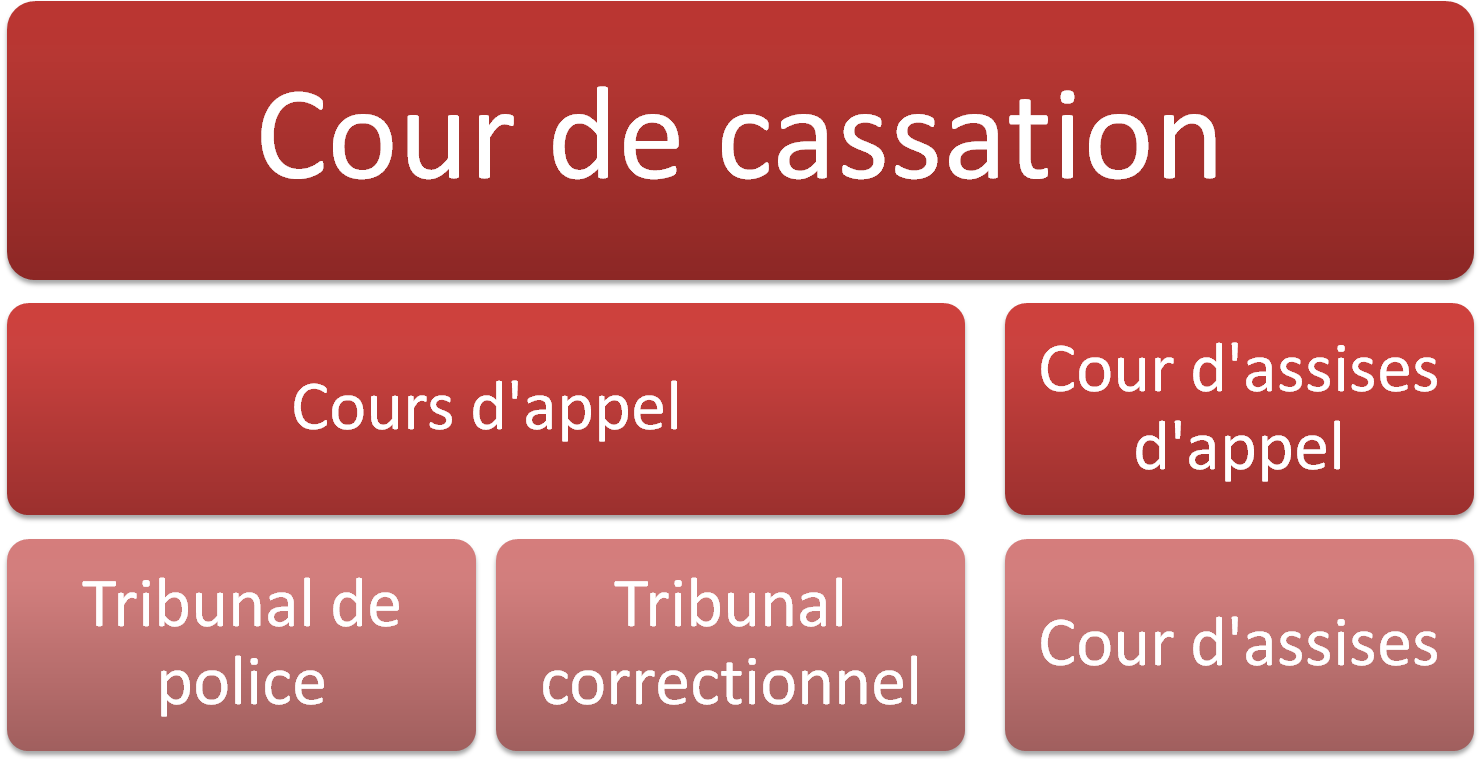
Organization of the judiciary order for the criminal branch.

Courts of the judiciary order (French: ordre judiciaire), known as "ordinary courts", have jurisdiction for two branches: settling civil cases between private individuals, as well as cases of criminal law.

The branch that deals with disputes between private individuals is the civil courts. Civil courts settle disputes (for example, rent, divorce, inheritance) but do not impose penalties. The criminal courts constitute the branch that handles criminal offenses, and punish offenses against people, property and society.

== Administrative order ==
The administrative courts (French: ordre administratif) in France are one of the two main branches of the French dual court system, the other being the judiciary order. It handles cases between individuals and the government at any level. Courts of the administrative order have jurisdiction when a "public person" (not a human, but a personne publique) is involved, for example, a municipality or a government department. Courts of the administrative order are organized in three levels: The Council of State, the administrative courts of appeal in the second instance, and the administrative courtsin the first instance; these courts ensure a balance between the prerogatives of public power and the rights of citizens.

Specifically excluded from administrative law are civil cases between private individuals, as well as cases of criminal law; these are both handled by the § ordinary courts.

== History and evolution ==
The dual system of law comprises private law (droit privé), also known as judicial law, and public law (droit public). This distinction dates back to Roman law.

=== Roman law ===
Roman law was codified, and in the south of France the Jus gentium continued to be used, although mostly only in the case of public and administrative law, and private law was left to the localities to determine. The distinction between private law and public law goes back to Ulpian, a Roman jurist of the third century, who wrote: "Public law is what regards the welfare of the Roman state, private law what regards the interests of individual persons; because some things are of public, others of private utility." (Note: Ulpian wrote: "huius studii duae sunt positiones: publicum et privatum. Publicum ius est, quod ad statum rei Romanae spectat; privatum, quod ad singulorum utilitatem." in Digest, § 1.2.1.1.)

=== Ancien Regime ===
During the Ancien Regime, the French court system was divided into two branches: the Parlement, which dealt with criminal and civil cases, and the Conseil d'Etat, which dealt with disputes between individuals and the government. This division was based on the idea of separating the judicial and administrative branches of government in order to prevent conflicts of interest and ensure a fair and impartial justice system.

During the Ancien Regime, the Conseil d'Etat played a crucial role in the development of French administrative law. The Conseil d'Etat issued decisions and opinions on legal disputes, which helped to establish a body of administrative law that governed the relationship between individuals and the state. Additionally, the Conseil d'Etat was responsible for advising the king on legal matters, which further solidified its role as the main administrative court.

Montesquieu expressed the distinction between the two, describing public law as, "laws concerning the relationship between those who govern and those who are governed", and private law as "laws concerning the relationship that all citizens have with each other". (Note: Montesquieu quotations: public law: "les lois dans le rapport qu'ont ceux qui gouvernent avec ceux qui sont gouvernés", and private law: "les lois dans le rapport que tous les citoyens ont entre eux".)

=== Changes and reforms ===
The French legal system has undergone several changes and reforms throughout history. After the French Revolution, the Conseil d'Etat was abolished and replaced with a new court system that was based on separation of powers. In the 19th century, the court system was further reorganized and the Conseil d'Etat was re-established as the main administrative court. In the 20th century, several reforms were implemented to improve the efficiency and effectiveness of the court system, including the introduction of new specialized courts and the streamlining of the judicial process.

In recent years, the French government has prioritized modernizing the court system by introducing new technologies to increase access to justice and simplifying judicial procedures to make the system more accessible to the public. These included the Légifrance website, offering open access to a complete database of French legal codes and legal texts, and improvements to the site of the Ministère de la Justice.

==== 2020 court reform ====
In 2020, there were significant reforms that resulted in the merger of two courts: the administrative court of appeal and the Council of State, creating the new juge des contentieux de la protection (judge of protection disputes) who handles disputes over the protection of individual rights.

- The reform aimed to simplify the court system and improve efficiency by reducing the number of courts and streamlining the judicial process.
- The merger of the administrative court of appeal and the Council of State was aimed at reducing the number of courts and streamlining the judicial process.
- The creation of the juge des contentieux de la protection is intended to improve the protection of individual rights.

== See also ==
- Adversarial system
- Codification (law)
- Cour d'appel (Appellate court)
- Court of Appeal (France)
- Court of Cassation
- Criminal justice system of France
- French criminal code
- French criminal law
- Glossary of French criminal law
- Inquisitorial system
- Law of France
- Napoleonic Code

== Works cited ==
- Beaudoin, Franck (15 October 2021). "French law: quick overview".
- Bermann, George A.; Picard, Etienne, eds. (1 January 2008). Introduction to French Law. Kluwer Law. ISBN 978-90-411-2466-1. OCLC 219574344.
- Dadomo, Christian; Farran, Susan (1996) [1st pub. 1993]. The French legal system (2nd ed.). London: Sweet & Maxwell. ISBN 0-421-53970-4.
- Isom, David (16 November 2022), Legal System - French Legal Research Guide - Guides at Georgetown Law Library, Georgetown Law Library see 'loi'
- République française; Secrétariat général du gouvernement (19 October 2022). "Légifrance Le service public de la diffusion du droit" [The public service for dissemination of the law]. Légifrance. Direction de l'information légale et administrative. ISSN 2270-8987. OCLC 867599055.
- French Ministry of Justice (15 November 2021). "Présentation de l'ordre judiciaire" [Presentation of the judicial order]. Ministère de la Justice (in French). "L'ordre judiciaire se divise en deux catégories de juridictions : les juridictions civiles et les juridictions pénales. Les juridictions civiles tranchent les litiges." [The judiciary order is divided into two categories of courts: the civil courts and the criminal courts. The civil courts decide disputes.]
- French Ministry of Justice (15 September 2021). "L'organisation de la justice en France" [Organization of justice in France]. Ministère de la Justice (in French). "Les juridictions françaises se répartissent en deux ordres : un ordre judiciaire et un ordre administratif. Les juridictions de l'ordre judiciaire sont compétentes pour régler les litiges opposant les personnes privées et pour sanctionner les auteurs d'infractions aux lois pénales. ... Les juridictions de l'ordre administratif sont compétentes dès qu'une personne publique est en cause (une municipalité ou un service de l'État par exemple)." [The French courts are divided into two orders: a judicial order and an administrative order. The courts of the judicial order are responsible for settling disputes between private individuals and for punishing the perpetrators of criminal offenses. ... The administrative courts have jurisdiction as soon as a public entity is involved (a municipality or a government department for example).]
- Sauvé, Jean-Marc (28 September 2016). "Le dualisme juridictionnel : synergies et complémentarité" [Jurisdictional dualism: synergy and complementarity] (in French). "Le dualisme juridictionnel, qui a d'ailleurs été expressément inscrit dans notre Constitution par la révision constitutionnelle du 23 juillet 2008 instituant l'article 61-1 relatif à la question prioritaire de constitutionnalité, ne saurait en effet être regardé que comme les deux faces d'une même pièce : deux ordres de juridiction rendant la justice « au nom du peuple français » représenté dans un seul État et dans un ordre juridique unique." [Jurisdictional dualism, which was moreover expressly enshrined in our Constitution by the constitutional revision of 23 July 2008 instituting article 61-1 relative to the preliminary question of constitutionality, can only be seen as two sides of the same coin: two orders of jurisdiction dispensing justice "in the name of the French people", as represented in a single State and in a single legal order.]
