= John Doe law (Wisconsin) =

Wisconsin law

The John Doe law is a prosecution tool in Wisconsin assisting prosecutors in uncovering crimes and their perpetrators. John Doe proceedings are performed to determine whether a crime has occurred and, if so, by whom. Under these investigations, prosecutors can compel testimony from reluctant witnesses, compel discovery of documents, or bar parties from disclosing information about the investigation.

John Doe investigations are governed by Wis. Stat. §968.26.

== See also ==
- Fictitious defendants
