= Andrew Leggatt =

British judge (1930–2020)

The Right Honourable Sir Andrew Leggatt

Lord Justice of Appeal
- In office 1990–1997

Justice of the High Court
- In office 1982–1990

Sir Andrew Peter Leggatt, PC (8 November 1930 – 21 February 2020) was a British judge who served as the Lord Justice of Appeal and as a member of the Privy Council. He was noted for his acerbic wit and precise, well-written judgements. As a barrister, his clients included Paul McCartney and Robert Bolt.

== Biography ==
He was educated at Eton College and King's College, Cambridge. He wrote Tribunals for Users – One System, One Service, published by the Department for Constitutional Affairs. He liked the English language and literature and was a member of the Queen's English Society.

He had two children, George and Alice. His son, George, is also a judge and was appointed to the UK Supreme Court before his father's death.

== Judgments ==
- Johnstone v Bloomsbury Health Authority [1991] 2 All ER 293, dissenting
- Vaughan v Barlow Clowes International Ltd [1991] EWCA Civ 11 – an English trusts law case, concerning tracing
- Nestle v National Westminster Bank plc [1992] EWCA Civ 12, duty of care for investment
- Fitzpatrick v British Railways Board [1992] ICR 221, [1992] IRLR 376 – United Kingdom labour law, concerning collective bargaining
- Johnstone v Bloomsbury HA [1992] QB 333, [1991] 2 WLR 1362, [1991] 2 All ER 293 – English contract law case, concerning implied terms and unfair terms under the Unfair Contract Terms Act 1977.
- Bishopsgate Investment Management Ltd v Maxwell (No 2) [1993] BCLC 814, pension fund misappropriation
- Bishopsgate Investment Management Ltd v Homan [1994] EWCA Civ 33 – English trusts law, whether a beneficiary whose fiduciary breaches trust, may trace assets through an overdrawn account to its destination.
- Powdrill v Watson [1995] 2 AC 394 – United Kingdom insolvency law, concerning adoption of employment contracts by insolvency practitioners
- Westdeutsche Landesbank Girozentrale v Islington LBC [1996] UKHL 12, overturned – English trusts law case concerning the circumstances under which a resulting trust arises.
- Investors Compensation Scheme Ltd v West Bromwich Building Society [1997] UKHL 28, overturned – English contract law, which laid down that a contextual approach must be taken to the interpretation of contracts.
- Fujitsu's Application [1997] EWCA Civ 1174 – confirming the rejection of a patent involving the computerisation of an existing process.
