= Abbey National Building Society v Cann =

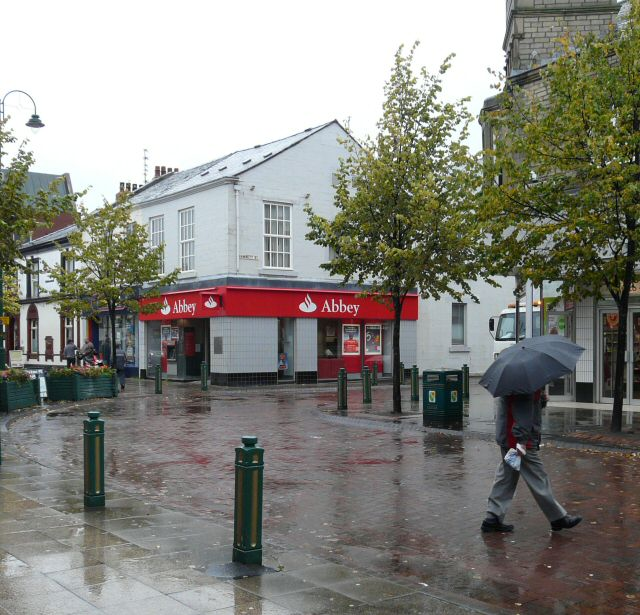
- Court: House of Lords
- Citations: [1990] UKHL 3, [1991] 1 AC 56

Case opinions
- Lord Oliver of Aylmerton and Lord Jauncey of Tullichettle

Keywords
- Actual occupation, scintilla temporis

Abbey National Building Society v Cann [1990] UKHL 3 is an English land law case concerning the right of a person with an equitable interest in a home to remain in actual occupation, if a bank has a charge and is seeking repossession. A controversial decision, it held that "actual occupation" entails some degree of permanence, and that if someone buys a property with a mortgage, the bank's charge is to be treated as having priority over any equitable interest.

== Facts ==
George Cann lived with his mother, Daisy, in Island Road, Mitcham in London. She had contributed to the purchase price of the home, and so George held the house on trust for himself and her, even though it was solely registered in his name. They moved to a smaller house that cost £4000 more in South Lodge Avenue. To buy it they used the proceeds of selling the Island Road home and got a mortgage from the Abbey National. Daisy knew this was necessary. She did not know that George had also taken another mortgage for £25,000. Later he could not repay and Abbey National wished to repossess the property. Daisy, whose new partner was also living there, argued that she had a right to remain in the home, because her equitable proprietary right arose before Abbey National, and this coupled with her actual occupation gave her an overriding interest under LRA 1925 section 70(1)(g) (now LRA 2002 Sch 3). She had started to move in carpets 35 minutes before the charge was completed. Abbey National argued that when the house was bought with its loan, her right could not arise before.

== Judgment ==
=== Court of Appeal ===
For the Court of Appeal, Dillon LJ, held that Daisy’s right arose before Abbey National’s, but that Abbey National succeeded in any case because Daisy had only been on the property for 35 minutes before completion, and the building society could not be expected to be put on inquiry in those circumstances.

Ralph Gibson LJ gave a short concurring judgment and Woolf LJ expressly stated he thought it would be unsatisfactory if on the facts Daisy Cann could be regarded as in actual occupation.

=== House of Lords ===
The House of Lords held that Daisy was not only not in actual occupation, but also that when the house was purchased with the mortgage, Daisy’s proprietary interest could not realistically be seen to arise before the building society’s. Actual occupation had to have some degree of permanence or continuity and acts of a preparatory nature, carried out by courtesy of the vendor, were not enough.

Lord Oliver said the following.

The reality is that, in the vast majority of cases, the acquisition of the legal estate and the charge are not only precisely simultaneous but indissolubly bound together. The acquisition of the legal estate is entirely dependent upon the provision of funds which will have been provided before the conveyance can take effect and which are provided only against an agreement that the estate will be charged to secure them. Indeed, in many, if not most, cases of building society mortgages, there will have been, as there was in this case, a formal offer and acceptance of an advance which will ripen into a specifically enforceable agreement immediately the funds are advanced [sic] which will normally be a day or more before completion.

Lord Jauncey further remarked that it was then ‘unnecessary to consider whether or not Mrs Cann was aware that George Cann would require to borrow money in order to finance the purchase of’ the new home.

== Significance ==
The case drew severe criticism for favouring the interests of banks and money lenders over people living in homes. It was pointed out that although a bank's loan might have been necessary for a buyer to complete a purchase, a person who had an equitable interest through financial contribution had given value that was no less necessary for the purchase. On the other hand, the point about whose interest was first in time won later judicial support, in particular from Lord Hoffmann in Ingram v IRC. "For my part," said Lord Hoffmann, "I do not think that a theory based upon the notion of the scintilla temporis can have a very powerful grasp on reality."

== See also ==
- English land law
