= Nielson-Jones v Fedden =

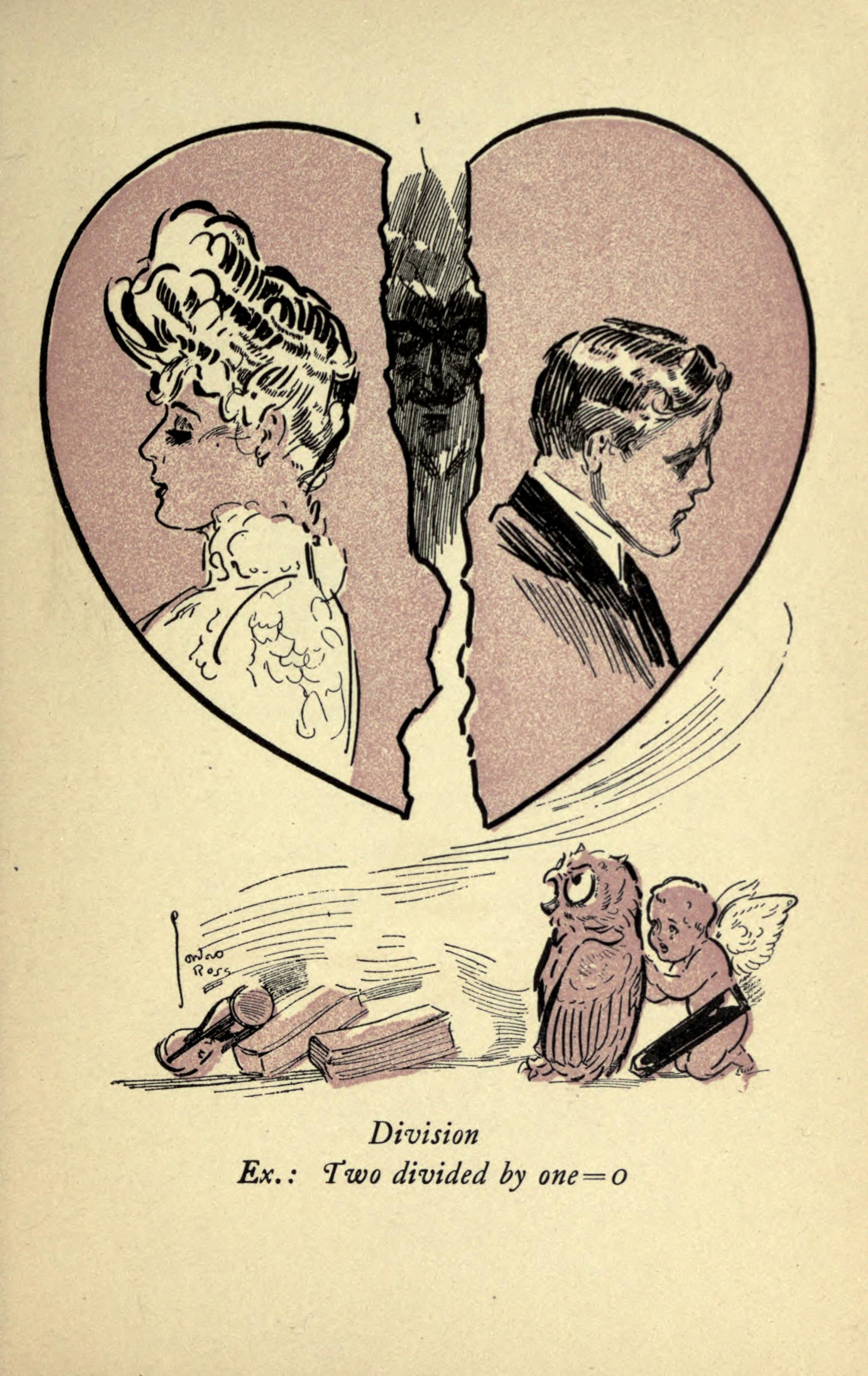
- Court: High Court (Chancery Division)
- Citation: [1975] Ch 222

Keywords
- Co-ownership; words of severance; section 36(2) Law of Property Act 1925

Nielson-Jones v Fedden [1975] Ch 222 is an English land law case, concerning co-ownership of land: specifically whether a settlement agreement between spouses or memorandum, vaguely worded amounted to "words of severance" as effective under section 36(2) Law of Property Act 1925. If so these are words which would render the parties tenants in common in equity.

== Facts ==
After a breakup in the relationship a memorandum was agreed to grant the husband discretion to sell the house. It said the husband should ‘use his entire discretion and free will’ to decide whether to sell their former matrimonial home in order to purchase a home for himself.

== Judgment ==
Walton J held this dealt with use of land, not ownership of proceeds of sale, and so severance was not effective. He said the memo was ‘wholly ambiguous’ about ownership. He felt notice must have been made irrevocable, so doubting Re Draper’s Conveyance as doubted in Burgess v Rawnsley [1975] Ch 429. The memo was insufficient to sever the joint tenancy under the Law of Property Act 1925, section 36(2) because it dealt with use and not ownership of the house/sale proceeds. Also, no (firm) agreement could be drawn from the parties’ ongoing negotiations.

== See also ==
- English trusts law
- English land law
- English property law
