= Moral rights in United Kingdom law =

UK copyright law regarding the author's personal interests

Moral rights in United Kingdom law are parts of copyright law that protect the personal interests of the author of a copyrighted work, as well as the economic interests protected by other elements of copyright. Found in the Copyright, Designs and Patents Act 1988, the moral rights are the right to be identified as the author of a work, known as the right of paternity, the right to object to derogatory treatment of a work, known as the right of integrity, the right not to be identified as the author of someone else's work, and the right to privacy. The right of paternity exists for the entire copyright term, and requires individuals who commercially broadcast, sell, perform or exhibit literary, dramatic, musical or artistic works to identify the author of the work – but this does not apply to things such as typefaces, encyclopaedias or works subject to crown copyright.

The right of integrity protects authors from having their copyrighted works altered in such a fashion as to constitute a "distortion" or "mutilation" of the original work, or in a way that harms the author's reputation or honour. Cases vary as to how the right of integrity should be interpreted, with some judges saying that "distortion" or "mutilation" should be taken to be part of the wider clause on reputation and honour to avoid subjective decisions, and others interpreting each clause as distinct types of violation. The right to object to false attribution protects individuals from being identified as the authors of works they have not contributed to; unlike the other moral rights it exists only for the individual's lifetime and the 20 years after death, not for the full term of copyright. The United Kingdom's law on moral rights has been criticised for failing to correctly implement the Berne Convention for the Protection of Literary and Artistic Works, and for being unreasonably narrow in the types of creative works it covers.

== Definition ==
Copyright law, throughout its history, has sought to protect not only the financial interests of the authors but also their personality rights. Evolving from the French droit moral, moral rights protect the personality and reputation of the copyrighted work's author. Under the Berne Convention for the Protection of Literary and Artistic Works, providing protection for moral rights is a requisite part of member states' legal systems. The actual rights provided vary from nation to nation; French law treats moral rights as supreme and perpetual, and German law gives both moral and economic rights the same weighting, but the British legal system has traditionally "manifested a certain scepticism towards claims that authors deserve special protection in law", and until the Copyright, Designs and Patents Act 1988, there was little protection. Even with the passage of the 1988 Act, academics still debate over how far the rights should go.

== Rights ==
Authors can still rely on the old common law rights which remain in force; they act as alternate forms of relief if a claim under dedicated moral rights is dubious, or is seen as unlikely to succeed. Similarly, an author can sometimes rely on contractual rights, as in Frisby v BBC, where the claimant was allowed to block modifications to his work by virtue of a contractual clause prohibiting the BBC from making "structural" changes to his script. Originally these were the only forms of relief for injured authors, although Section 43 of the Copyright Act 1956 created a "tort of misattribution". With the 1988 Act, however, four distinct moral rights were recognised: the right to be identified as the author (the right of paternity), the right to object to derogatory treatment (the right of integrity), the right to object to false attribution, and the right to privacy in private films and photographs. Because moral rights are personal rights attached to the author, rather than economic rights attached to the work, they cannot be transferred or assigned, but they can be waived.

=== Right to be identified ===
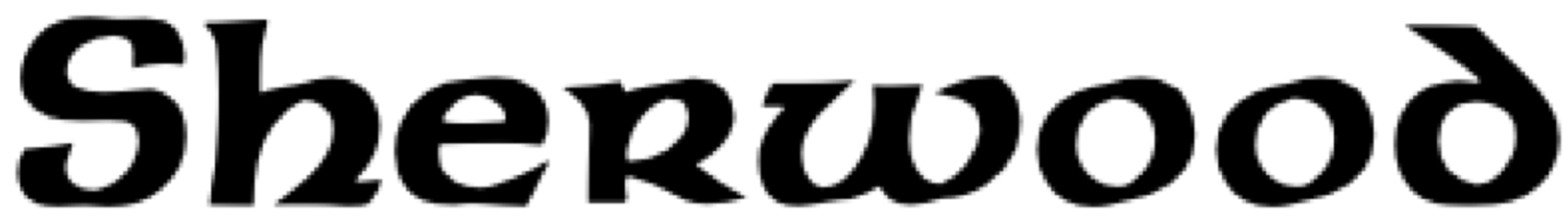
An example of a typeface, to which the right to be identified (or right of paternity) does not apply.

The right to be identified, known as the right of paternity, applies to the creators of original literary, dramatic, musical or artistic works; for films, the right to be identified is granted to the director rather than the writer. Some specific types of work are not protected by this right, particularly those made to report current events, periodicals, newspapers or encyclopaedias. These exceptions were included as a result of lobbying by the publishing industry, and the fear that the need to name the author of a current events report could interfere with its speedy delivery, and undermine the image of the news as objective and neutral. Under Section 79, the right to be identified also does not apply to authors of computer programs, computer-generated works, typefaces or works protected by crown copyright. On those works which are covered by this moral right, there is a need to assert it; this may be done through an instrument assigning copyright, or any other instrument written by the author or director. If the asserting is done through a document designed to assign copyright, it binds the assignee and anyone who claims through him, with or without notice; if it is done through another instrument, it only applies to those who are directly informed of the assertion.

Once the right to be identified has been asserted, it applies for the duration of copyright, but only for works created after 1 August 1989. If the right is then infringed, the author or director has legal recourse. For the right to be infringed, the author must show that they have not been properly identified, that this was in circumstances where the work should have been attributed, and that none of the exceptions or defences apply. In regards to the lack of proper identification, for identification to be acceptable the name of the author must appear in each copy of the work in a prominent fashion, under Section 77(7) of the 1988 Act; where it is not appropriate for the author's name to appear on each copy, it must appear in a fashion that brings their identity to the attention of any person using or acquiring a copy of the work. If the work is a building, the name must be visible to people entering or approaching it. If the author specifies a pseudonym or some other form of identification when asserting the right of attribution, that form of identification should be adopted.

Specific circumstances lead to a requirement for attribution, and it is only in these circumstances that the right to be identified can be infringed. An author of a literary or dramatic work has the right to be identified whenever the work is broadcast, performed in public or sold commercially, while the director of a film has the right to be named when videos are commercially sold, or when the film is broadcast on television or in other formats. Songwriters are treated slightly differently, in that while the author of a song has the right to be named on commercial publications, there is no requirement to identify them when the song is broadcast or performed in public. Where the work is artistic, the artist has the right to be identified where the work is commercially published, exhibited in public, or where a visual image is broadcast; if the artwork is recorded, the artist should be identified when the resulting film is shown in public. If the work is a sculpture, "work of artistic craftsmanship" or building, the author should also be named where "copies of a graphic work representing it or of a photograph of it" are shown to the public.

=== Right to object to derogatory treatment ===
The right to object to derogatory treatment, or "right of integrity", is considered by Bently and Sherman to be "one of the most important of the innovations in the 1988 Act". Applying to authors of literary, dramatic, musical or artistic works, as well as the directors of films, the right forbids "derogatory treatment" of the copyrighted work in circumstances where the author should be protected from such treatment. The word treatment refers to "any addition to, deletion from, alteration to or adaptation of the work" – in other words, any interference with the work's internal structure. This deliberately excludes translations of literary works, or arrangements or transcriptions of musical works involving nothing more than a change in key or register.

Once it has been proven that modifications amounted to a "treatment", that treatment must then be derogatory. Section 80(2)(b) of the 1988 Act provides that a treatment is derogatory if it constitutes a "distortion" or "mutilation" of the work, or otherwise damages the honour or reputation of the author. The Act gives no guidance as to what constitutes distortion or mutilation, and the courts have in some cases adopted the idea that these concepts should be considered part of the clause prohibiting damage to the author's honour or reputation, as in Confetti Records v Warner Music UK Ltd. This is because the alternative – simply looking at distortion and mutilation as individual concepts – could result in confusion due to the highly subjective nature of the words. Other judges have supported the interpretation that distortions and mutilations can be treated as individual concepts, and that treatments harming the author's reputation are only considered in that light if the treatment is not derogatory enough to constitute a distortion, as in Tidy v Trustees of the Natural History Museum.

Derogatory treatment must also have occurred in circumstances where the author has the right to be protected from it. The right to object to such treatment does not exist simply to protect damage, mutilation or the author's reputation. For literary, dramatic or musical works, the author is protected from derogatory treatment if the treatment is published commercially, performed in public or communicated to the public; he is also protected when a film or sound recording including the derogatory treatment is publicly issued. If the work is an artistic one, the author can sue when the derogatory treatment is commercially published or publicly exhibited, or when someone publicly shows a film or sound recording of the treatment. For films, the author is protected when the derogatory treatment is shown or communicated to the public, or when copies of it are issued to the public.

While exceptions to normal infringement such as fair dealing do not apply, the right to object to derogatory treatment has its own, individualised exceptions. When works are created by employees of a company in the course of their work, the company or its other employees can alter the work in question, with the author's rights "giving way to the light of business reality". This exception does not apply if the employee has already been identified on the work, either at the time of alteration or at any point beforehand. Another exception allows for the alteration of work in order to avoid committing a criminal offence, such as one of those under the Obscene Publications Act 1959.

=== Right to object to false attribution ===
The right to object to false attribution is the oldest of the statutory moral rights, originating (albeit in a limited form) in the Fine Arts Copyright Act 1862. Found in Section 84 of the 1988 Act, the right to object to false attribution allows individuals to avoid being named on works they are not the author of, and applies to literary, dramatic, musical or artistic works, as well as films. It only applies to acts of false attribution perpetrated after 1 August 1989, and lasts for 20 years after the death of the person falsely attributed with authorship. It is infringed whenever an individual issues copies of a work to the public, exhibits them in public or broadcasts them with a false attribution.

Whether or not a work is attributed to the wrong person depends on, according to Clark v Associated Newspapers, "the single meaning which ... the work conveys to the notional reasonable reader". There is no need to prove that the false attribution caused any harm to the actual author, and the right has been interpreted to cover situations as diverse as a newspaper parody of Alan Clark's diaries, an interview with Dorothy Squires and a replica painting that contained the signature of the original author. The right is closely linked to passing off, defamation and other non-statutory causes of action, which may be used to supplement a claim for infringing the right to object to false attribution. David Vaver, writing in the International Journal of Law and Information Technology, goes as far as to say that the right to object to false attribution is merely "passing off, writ large". Cornish, Llewelyn and Aplin also note a strong overlap between the rights against false attribution and against derogatory treatment.

=== Right to privacy ===
The moral right to privacy was the "first acknowledgement in English law of any right to privacy", although it operates in limited circumstances. Under it, where an individual has a photograph or film commissioned for private use, and this is original enough to be copyrighted, they hold a monopoly on broadcasting it, showing it publicly and issuing copies to the public. This right lasts for the length of the copyright, and each commissioner of the work holds the right individually; any person who has commissioned the work may choose to license it.

== Criticism ==
The United Kingdom law relating to moral rights has been repeatedly criticised, primarily for failing to entirely comply with the Berne Convention. Bently and Sherman point out that the right to object to derogatory treatment uses a far narrower definition of treatment than the Convention, which merely requires that the author be able to object to "any ... derogatory action" without limitation. Vaver notes a "grudging attitude toward moral rights, at least if the expression given these rights in [the 1988 Act] is any testament". Article 5(2) of the Berne Convention requires that the exercise of authors' moral rights "shall not be subject to any formality", while the right to attribution requires that the author assert ownership in writing, and is not available to authors by default. In addition, the exclusion of things such as encyclopedias, computer programs and typefaces is "out of step with international practise".

== Bibliography ==
- Bently, Lionel; Sherman, Brad (2009). Intellectual Property Law (3rd ed.). Oxford University Press. ISBN 978-0-19-929204-2.
- Cornish, William; Llewelyn, David; Aplin, Tanya (2010). Intellectual Property: Patents, Copyright, Trademarks and Allied Rights (7th ed.). Sweet & Maxwell. ISBN 978-1-84703-923-1.
- Vaver, David (1999). "Moral Rights Yesterday, Today and Tomorrow". International Journal of Law and Information Technology. 7 (3). Oxford University Press. ISSN 1464-3693.
