= Vaughan v Barlow Clowes International Ltd =

- Court: Court of Appeal
- Citations: [1991] EWCA Civ 11, [1992] 4 All ER 22

Court membership
- Judges sitting: Dillon LJ, Woolf LJ, Leggatt LJ

Keywords
- Tracing

Vaughan v Barlow Clowes International Ltd [1991] EWCA Civ 11 is an English trusts law case, concerning tracing.

== Facts ==
The receivers of Barlow Clowes, a failed investment management firm, applied to determine in what order they should distribute assets to the creditors in Portfolios 28 and 68. Contributors to these managed investment plan accounts had advanced money, and were aware the money was to be invested as a collective fund. Specific investments were not earmarked for specific investors. In the event, the assets were misapplied and mostly dissipated.

Peter Gibson J held that the first in first out rule applied. The early investors appealed, represented by Mr Walker QC.

== Judgment ==
The Court of Appeal held that contributors could not have intended that withdrawals from the account, and investments then purchased, could be allocated by reference to the order the contributions were made. So the first in first out rule is more of a default rule. It would not be applied if the result would be ‘impracticable or result in injustice’. It was not intended that only a small number of investors would get the most out of the fund. They would share rateably, pari passu.

Dillon LJ said the following:

The proceedings were brought in England by leave of the Gibraltar Court, since it is accepted that — except for the moneys in the two bank accounts specified in Schedule C to the order of Peter Gibson J, as to which no issue arises — the assets and moneys in question are trust moneys held on trust for all or some of the would-be investors ( “the investors” ) who paid moneys to BCI or associated bodies for investment, and are not general assets of BCI. Some 95 per cent of the investors are UK residents and a substantial majority of them are resident within the jurisdiction of the English Court.

[His Lordship noted Re Ontario Securities Commission and continued....]

The complexities of this method would, however, in a case where there are as many depositors as in the present case and even with the benefits of modern computer technology, and the cost would be so high, that no one has sought to urge the court to adopt it, and I would reject it as impracticable in the present case.

Dillon LJ also noted that in The Mecca Lord Halsbury LC said, ‘the circumstances of a case may afford ground for inferring that transactions of the parties were not so intended as to come under this general rule’ of Clayton's Case.

Woolf LJ said (1) the first in first out rule would apply prima facie, but would not be applied if ‘impracticable or would result in injustice’ and (2) the rule would not be applied if contrary to the parties’ presumed intention (3) then the alternative basis for distribution would depend on which practical alternative is most satisfactory in the circumstances (4) all solutions must depend on the ability to trace money.

Leggatt LJ said that the rolling charge approach is fairer and more coherent, however it is more difficult to apply, than simple pari passu, and so this (pari) was applied.

== See also ==
- English trusts law
- Russell-Cooke Trust Co v Prentis [2002] EWHC 2227 (Ch), [2003] 2 All ER 478, Lindsay J, ‘in terms of its actual application between beneficiaries who have in any sense met a shared misfortune, it might be more accurate to refer to the exception that is, rather than the rule in, Clayton's Case.’
- Commerzbank Aktiengesellschaft v IMB Morgan plc [2004] EWHC 2771 (Ch), [2005] 2 All ER (Comm) 564, Lawrence Collins J, endorsed Woolf LJ, and rejected it on the facts, that ‘it would be both impracticable and unjust to apply it.’
- Shalson v Russo [2003] EWHC 1637, [2005] Ch 281, Rimer J approved of the Barlow Clowes rolling charge approach. A ‘cherry picking’ exercise is allowed so the wrongdoing trustee is not ‘left with all the cherries and the victim nothing’.
- Sinclair v Brougham [1914] AC 398,
- Ministry of Health v Simpson [1948] Ch 465 followed;
- Re British Red Cross Balkan Fund [1914] 2 Ch 419,
- Re Hobourn Aero Components Ltds Trusts [1945] 2 All ER 711 applied.
- Clayton's Case [1814-23] All ER Rep 1 considered.
