= Re Draper's Conveyance =

English land law case

Re Draper’s Conveyance
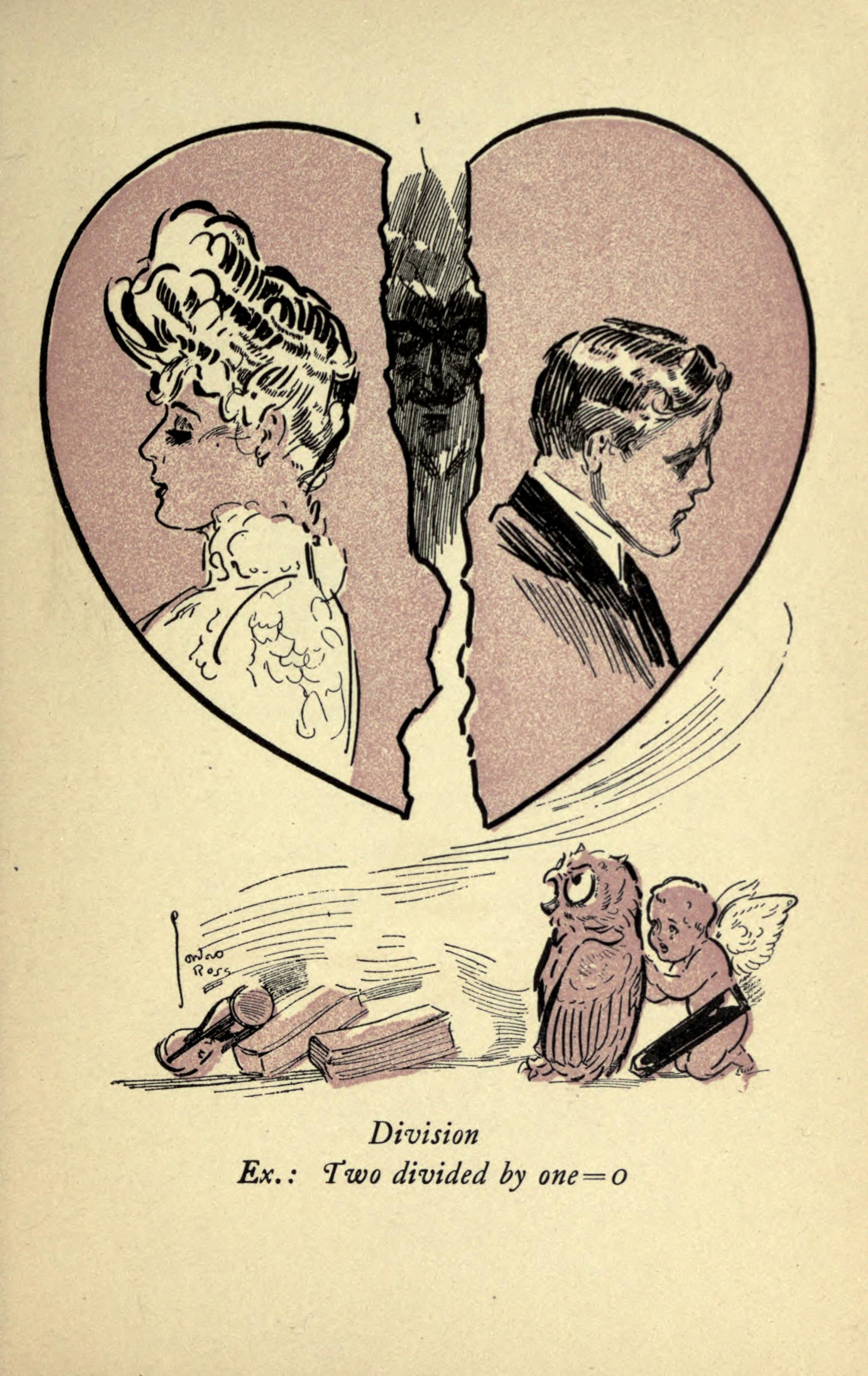
- Court: High Court, Chancery Division
- Full case name: In re Draper's Conveyance Nihan v Porter and Another
- Decided: 18 October 1967
- Citations: [1969] 1 Ch 486 [1968] 2 WLR 166 [1967] 3 All ER 853

Case history
- Prior action: none
- Subsequent action: none

Court membership
- Judge sitting: Plowman J

Case opinions
- Held: there was severance in equity with the affidavit supporting the summons

Keywords
- co-ownership: joint tenancy: severance; matrimonial law; sworn affidavit for half interest; untimely death

Re Draper's Conveyance [1967] is an English land law case, concerning co-ownership of land.

== Facts ==
A husband and wife, joint tenants, divorced and she issued a summons under the Married Women's Property Act 1882, section 17 for the house to be sold and proceeds split between them. She swore an affidavit saying she wanted proceeds to be ‘distributed equally; alternatively, that [the husband] pay me one half the value ...’. The court issued between the parties an order for long-term possession and sale was such that the husband could stay in possession until his death. He died before divorce proceedings were finished. The children of the husband wanted there to be severance so they could claim the father's share, and not have their stepmother entitled to the whole. The question was whether a severance of the joint tenancy was effective.

== Judgment ==
Plowman J held there was severance in equity with the affidavit supporting the summons on 11 February 1966. He noted counsel's argument that the court has no power under the Married Woman's Property Act 1882 to sever the beneficial joint tenancy. That was irrelevant because the affidavit severed, not the court. That was the true construction of Law of Property Act 1925, section 36.

== Distinguished in ==
- Nielson-Jones v Fedden [1975] Ch 222, EWHC (tacitly)

== Applied in ==
- Quigley v Masterson [2011] EWHC 2529 (Ch)

== See also ==
- English trusts law
- English land law
- Co-ownership
- Harris v Goddard [1983] 3 All ER 242 - a divorce petition alone held not to sever the joint tenancy
