= Macmillan v Bishopsgate =

Macmillan v Bishopsgate may refer to a series of judicial decisions in the English courts, including:

- Bishopsgate Investment Management Ltd v Maxwell (No 2)
- Macmillan Inc v Bishopsgate Investment Trust plc (No 3)
