= Jones v University of Manchester =

British labor law case

- Court: Court of Appeal

Court membership
- Judge sitting: Ralph Gibson LJ

Keywords
- Indirect discrimination, justification

Jones v University of Manchester [1993] ICR 474 is a leading discrimination case relevant for UK labour law, concerning the test for justification of indirect discrimination.

== Facts ==
A 44-year-old woman claimed she was discriminated against on grounds of sex. She was turned down for a job limited to graduates aged 27 to 35. She got her degree as a mature student. The University argued that the limit was justified because careers advisers should be ‘not too far removed in age from the students’ and because they wanted to achieve a spread in age groups, which were 63, 62, 54, 47, 45 and 42 at the time.

Tribunal held the pool for comparison was men and women who got degrees when they were aged 25 or over. There were fewer women under age 35 that got degrees than men. Therefore Ms Jones won. It said that the university also lost on justification. The Employment Appeal Tribunal held (following Perera on the absolute bar approach) that the pool had been artificially restricted, and on justification it had ‘effectively dismissed the matters relied upon by [the University] once it was demonstrated that they were not essential.’

== Judgment ==
Ralph Gibson LJ held that the Tribunal was entitled to find the age requirement discriminatory so long as proof of disparate impact was shown. However, the correct pool for comparison was all male and female graduates with necessary experience. So the Employment Appeal Tribunal was upheld. Further, the Tribunal was right to construe ‘justifiable’ in Sex Discrimination Act 1975, section 1(1)(b)(ii), to mean an objective balance between the condition’s discriminatory effect the employer’s reasonable needs. But the Tribunal had gone about the balancing exercise wrongly. He said one must look both at the quantitative effect and the qualitative effect (how many are adversely affected and how bad is the effect is).

== See also ==
- UK labour law
- EU labour law
