= Brian Dillon (judge) =

British lawyer (1925–2003)

The Right Honourable Sir Brian Dillon

Lord Justice of Appeal
- In office 1982–1994

Justice of the High Court

Personal details
- Born: 2 October 1925
- Died: 22 June 2003 (aged 77)
- Spouse: Alison Lane
- Children: 4
- Education: Sandroyd School; Winchester College; New College, Oxford

Sir George Brian Hugh Dillon, PC (2 October 1925 – 22 June 2003) was a British lawyer and judge who served as a Lord Justice of Appeal from 1982 to 1994.

== Biography ==
Dillon was born in a naval family, the son of Captain George Crozier Dillon, RN, and the grandson of an admiral. He was educated at Winchester College, where he was a scholar, before proceeding to New College, Oxford, also as a scholar. Initially reading Classics, he switched to law, before joining the Royal Naval Volunteer Reserve in 1943, training at HMS Ganges before serving in the Far East abroad the destroyer HMS Tyrian.

Returning to Oxford after the war, he was called to the bar by Lincoln's Inn in 1948, and acquired a "huge practice" at the Chancery bar. He took silk in 1965 and became head of chambers.

He was appointed a judge of the High Court of Justice, in 1979, assigned to the Chancery Division and received the customary knighthood. He was promoted to the Court of Appeal in 1982, and was sworn of the Privy Council. He retired in 1994.

== Family ==
Dillon married Alison Lane in 1954; they had two sons and two daughters.

== Selected judgments ==
Lord Justice Dillon's reported cases include:

- Notcutt v Universal Equipment Co (London) Ltd [1986] ICR 414
- R & B Customs Brokers Co Ltd v United Dominions Trust Ltd [1988] 1 WLR 321
- Interfoto Picture Library Ltd v Stiletto Visual Programmes Ltd [1989] QB 433
- Hunter v Moss [1994] 1 WLR 452
- Vaughan v Barlow Clowes International Ltd [1991] EWCA Civ 11 - English trusts law, concerning tracing
- Powdrill v Watson
- Re Sevenoaks Stationers (Retail) Ltd
- Harris v Goddard
- Bishopsgate Investment Management Ltd v Homan [1994] EWCA Civ 33 - English trusts law, whether a beneficiary whose fiduciary breaches trust, may trace assets through an overdrawn account to its destination.
- Abbey National Building Society v Cann
- Multinational Gas and Petrochemical Co v Multinational Gas and Petrochemical Services Ltd
- Alec Lobb (Garages) Ltd v Total Oil (GB) Ltd
- Fitzpatrick v British Railways Board [1992] ICR 221, [1992] IRLR 376 - UK labour law, concerning collective bargaining
- Nestle v National Westminster Bank plc [1992] EWCA Civ 12, [1993] 1 WLR 1260 - English trusts law case concerning the duty of care when a trustee is making an investment.
