= Bishopsgate Investment Management Ltd v Homan =

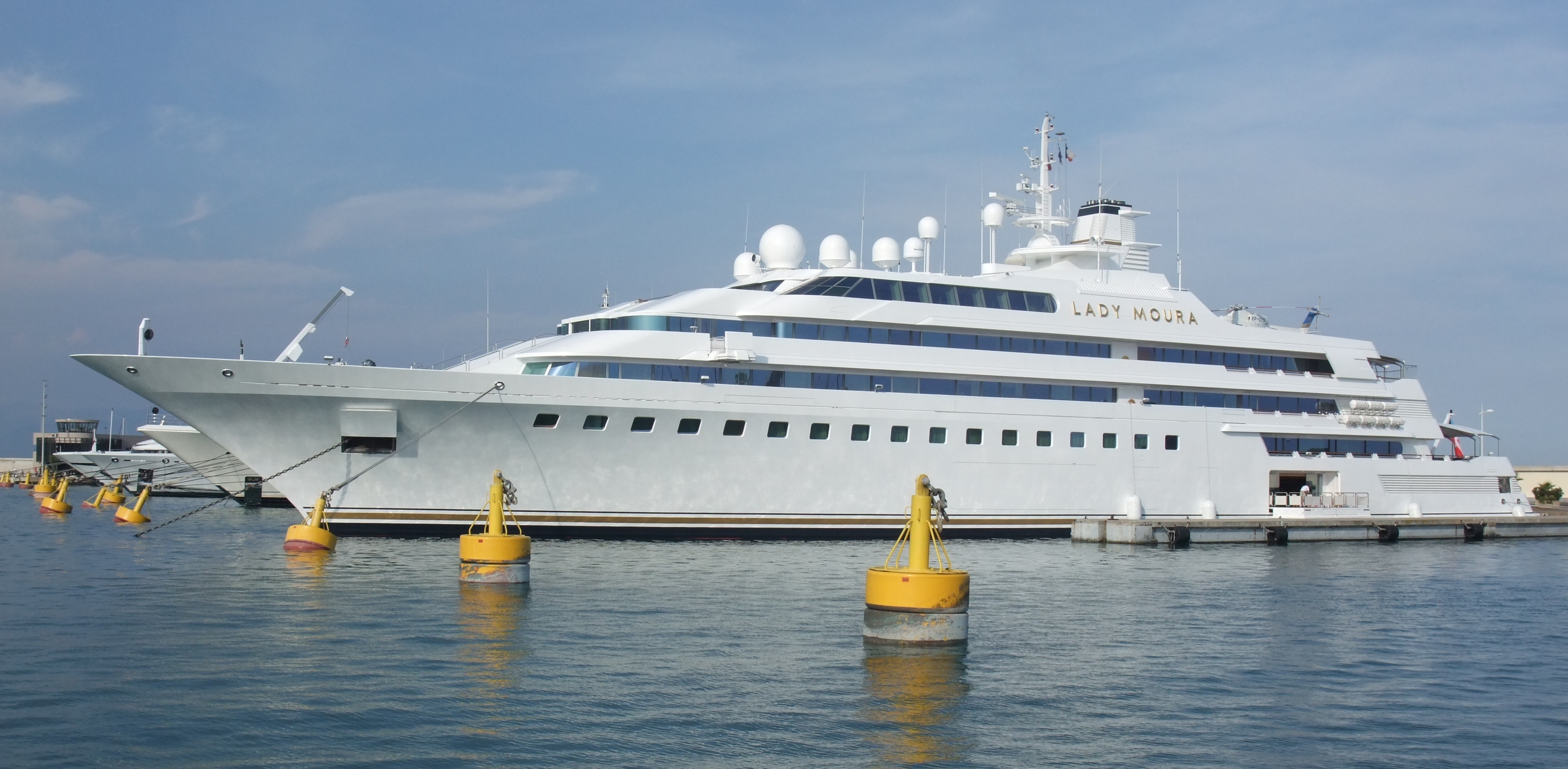
- Court: Court of Appeal
- Citations: [1994] EWCA Civ 33, [1995] Ch 211

Court membership
- Judges sitting: Dillon LJ, Leggatt LJ, Henry LJ

Keywords
- Tracing, backwards

Bishopsgate Investment Management Ltd v Homan [1994] EWCA Civ 33 is an English trusts law case about whether a beneficiary whose fiduciary breaches trust may trace assets through an overdrawn account to its destination.

== Facts ==
Mr Homan, a PriceWaterhouseCoopers partner, administered the insolvent companies of Robert Maxwell. After Maxwell fell off his luxury yacht and died, it was revealed that he had taken his employees' pension money. Bishopsgate Investment Management Ltd. was the trustee of pension moneys belonging to the employees of Maxwell Communications Corporation plc. In breach of trust, Maxwell paid the pension money into the overdrawn accounts of MCC. Upon liquidation, Bishopsgate claimed it was entitled to trace the pension money to create an equitable charge over all the assets of MCC, and thus priority over unsecured creditors of MCC.

== Judgment ==
=== High Court ===
Vinelott J held that there could be no equitable charge. He accepted there could be backwards tracing if (1) property is acquired with money from an overdrawn account, because the defendant could be presumed to intend to pay off the overdraft (2) if trust money is paid into an overdrawn account to free up the limit and enable purchase of another

=== Court of Appeal ===
The Court of Appeal held that a tracing chain between the misappropriated money and the present assets of MCC could not be established. The misappropriated money was paid into an overdrawn account. At that point the mixed fund was exhausted. Unless there was evidence that payments were made to the overdrawn account with the intention of benefiting the trust fund from which monies had been withdrawn, which in Maxwell’s case appeared highly unlikely, no equitable charge could be imputed against the credit balance. BIM could therefore not recover any of the misappropriated pension fund monies from MCC in priority to the unsecured creditors.

Dillon LJ held there was no particular asset into which property could be traced, if an account were overdrawn. He endorsed Vinelott J’s, saying it was ‘at least arguable’ that there would be an equitable charge.

Leggatt LJ held that backwards tracing was impossible.

there can be no equitable remedy against an asset acquired before misappropriation of money takes place, since ex hypothesi it cannot be followed into something which existed and so had been acquired before the money was received and without its aid.

Henry LJ concurred.

The House of Lords dismissed the petition to appeal.

== See also ==
- English trusts law
- Bishopsgate Investment Management Ltd v Maxwell (No 2) [1993] BCLC 814, director's duty to act for proper purposes
- Macmillan Inc v Bishopsgate Investment Trust plc (No 3)
