= Denis Henry (English judge) =

English barrister & judge (1931–2010)

Sir Denis Robert Maurice Henry, PC (19 April 1931 – 6 March 2010) was an English barrister, Queen's Counsel and judge, rising to Lord Justice of Appeal. He presided over the Guinness share-trading fraud trial, a major British business scandal of the 1980s.

== Education ==
Denis Henry was born 19 April 1931 in Margate, son of a British Indian Army Brigadier in the 5th Maratha Light Infantry. He lived as a child in Quetta and New Delhi, later in Oxford and during World War II in Boston, Massachusetts as an evacuee. He was educated at Shrewsbury School, then performed national service with the King's Own Royal Regiment, and afterwards read law at Balliol College, Oxford.

== Career ==
His career as a barrister started in 1955 when he was called to the bar, and he was appointed Queen's Counsel in 1977. Derry Irvine was a pupil; Tom Bingham and Charlie Falconer were members of his chambers.

He was appointed Recorder in 1979, High Court judge in 1986 and in 1993 was made a Lord Justice of Appeal. In the following year, he became chairman of the Judicial Studies Board, a post he held for five years. He retired in 2002.

He is perhaps best noted for presiding over two Guinness share-trading fraud trials in the 1980s, the first resulting in long prison sentences and heavy fines for Ernest Saunders, Gerald Ronson, Jack Lyons and Anthony Parnes. An obituary in The Scotsman suggests that it was for the meticulous care he had shown in representing Acas in a case connected with the Grunwick dispute that he was chosen to preside at the Guinness trial, despite only slight experience in criminal law.

=== Judgments ===
Henry's judgments include:

- Bishopsgate Investment Management Ltd v Homan [1994] EWCA Civ 33, [1995] Ch 211 – an English trusts law case about whether a beneficiary whose fiduciary breaches trust, may trace assets through an overdrawn account to its destination – like Guinness, this case concerned the high-profile collapse of Robert Maxwell's business empire.
- Lane v Shire Roofing Co (Oxford) Ltd [1995] EWCA Civ 37, [1995] IRLR 493 – UK labour law case concerning the responsibility for safety at work for contracted employees, which took the view that irrespective of the contractual position, where the employee is integrated in the business, an employment contract should be held to exist.
- Powdrill v Watson [1995] 2 AC 394, [1995] 2 WLR 312 – UK insolvency law case concerning the administration procedure when a company is unable to repay its debts. Henry dismissed an appeal, and was supported when the case went to the House of Lords.
- Pro Sieben Media AG v Carlton UK Television Ltd [1999] 1 WLR 605, [1999] FSR 610 – United Kingdom copyright law case concerned with the fair dealing exception to copyright.
- Ropaigealach v Barclays Bank plc [2000] QB 263, [1999] 3 WLR 17, [1998] EG 189, (2000) 32 HLR 234, [1998] EWCA Civ 1960, [1999] 4 All ER 235 – English land law case, concerning mortgage affirming that a bank could repossess a property without a court order.
- Environment Agency v Clark [2001] Ch 57 – UK insolvency law case concerning the right of creditors to bring proceedings against insolvent companies in administration.

== Personal life ==
Henry was married in 1963 to Linda (née Arthur), and the couple had three children. A young daughter predeceased him. He was a keen golfer, playing from a low handicap and was awarded a half blue at Balliol, and elected captain of Royal Wimbledon Golf Club. He contracted Parkinson's disease and died on 6 March 2010 after a long illness.
