= Re Shoe Lace Ltd =

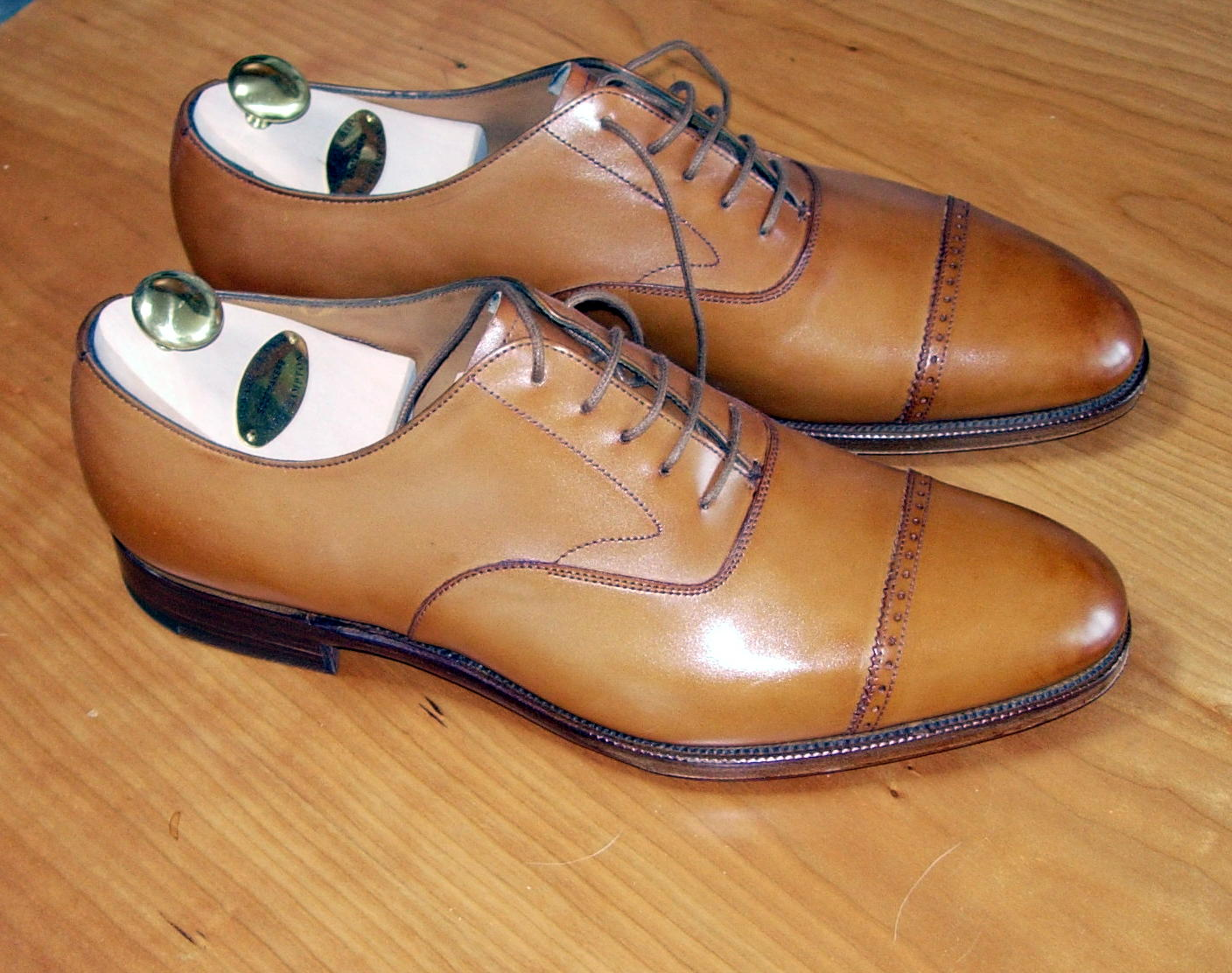
- Court: High Court
- Full case name: Re Shoe Lace Ltd or Power v Sharp Investments Ltd
- Citation: [1994] 1 BCLC 111

Keywords
- Voidable preference, undervalue transaction

Re Shoe Lace Ltd [1994] 1 BCLC 111 is a leading UK insolvency law case, concerning voidable transactions.

== Facts ==
The liquidator of Shoe Lace Ltd sought a declaration that a debenture given to Sharp Investments Ltd, which owned 80 per cent of Shoe Lace and was part of a group controlled by the alleged shadow director Mr Mahtani who lived in Ratingen, was invalid under the Insolvency Act 1986 section 245 because it was created after payments to the company. Shoe Lace had shoe shops in Lancashire and Yorkshire but was hopelessly insolvent by April 1990. It gave a debenture to Sharp Investments Ltd secured with a floating charge over the whole undertaking on 24 July. Sharp gave it £300,000 on 3 April, £50,000 in May and £11,500 in July. The Insolvency Act 1986 section 245(2)(a) states that a floating charge is voidable if the value given for the charge does not come after or ‘at the same time’ as the charge was created. It was questioned what the precise time limit of this was.

== Judgment ==
Hoffmann J held that the debenture was voidable, because no businessman would hold this to have been at the same time.

There is no authority upon the meaning of “at the same time as” in sec. 245. The degree of contemporaneity which such words connote must depend upon the context. It might not be unreasonable to say that two species of dinosaur became extinct “at the same time” when millions of years separates their last known representatives. On the other hand, one would not say that the winner of a 100 metres race crossed the tape at the same time as the runner who came second, even though they were separated by less than a tenth of a second. In sec. 245, the context is commercial and regulatory. For example, it forms part of a scheme which includes the requirement that particulars of a floating charge must be delivered to the registrar of companies within 21 days of its creation. The question, I think, is whether a businessman having knowledge of the kind of time limits imposed by the Insolvency and Companies Acts and using ordinary language would say that the payments had been made at the same time as the execution of the debenture.

Ralph Gibson LJ, Nolan LJ and Sir Christopher Slade upheld Hoffmann J that a delay of any substantial length (more than a coffee break) would be fatal to the exception.

== See also ==
- UK insolvency law
