= Lane v Shire Roofing Co (Oxford) Ltd =

- Court: Court of Appeal of England and Wales
- Decided: 16 February 1995
- Citations: [1995] EWCA Civ 37, [1995] IRLR 493

Court membership
- Judges sitting: Nourse LJ, Henry LJ and Auld LJ

Keywords
- Contract of employment

Lane v Shire Roofing Co (Oxford) Ltd [1995] EWCA Civ 37 is a UK labour law case concerning the scope of protection for people to employment rights. It took the view that for an employment contract to exist, the employee must be integrated in the business.

== Judgment ==
In the High Court the judge found that Mr Lane was an independent contractor.

In the Court of Appeal, however, it was held by Henry LJ that, in relation to the porch job, this was the company’s business and not Mr Lane’s:

When it comes to the question of safety at work, there is a real public interest in recognising the employer/employee relationship when it exists, because of the responsibilities that the common law and statutes place on the employer.

== See also ==
- Contract of employment in English law
- UK labour law
- EU labour law
- US labor law
- German labour law
