= Pro Sieben Media AG v Carlton UK Television Ltd =

Pro Sieben Media v Carlton Television
- Court: Court of Appeal of England and Wales
- Full case name: Pro Sieben Media AG v Carlton UK Television Ltd
- Citation: [1999] 1 WLR 605, [1999] FSR 610

Case history
- Prior action: High Court

Court membership
- Judges sitting: Walker LJ; Henry LJ; Nourse LJ

Case opinions
- Walker LJ

Keywords
- Copyright, fair dealing

Pro Sieben Media v Carlton Television [1999] 1 WLR 605 was a decision by the Court of Appeal of England and Wales over the fair dealing exception to United Kingdom copyright law. ProSieben had broadcast an interview on Taff with Mandy Allwood, a woman who was pregnant with octuplets. Carlton Television produced a current affairs program that used a 30 second extract from this interview, and had copied the entire program for the purposes of selecting the extract to be used. Pro Sieben Media sued Carlton, alleging copyright infringement, while Carlton argued that the use of the extract constituted fair dealing, as it was for the purposes of criticism or review, or for reporting current events.

After losing in front of Laddie J in the High Court of Justice, Carlton appealed the decision to the Court of Appeal, where the case was heard by Walker, Henry and Nourse LJJ. In a decision written by Walker, and unanimously supported, the Court of Appeal confirmed that criticism or review as a concept did not just require criticism or review of the work being copied, but could also cover the social or moral implications of the work and ideas found within it. As such, the Carlton program, which was created to criticise chequebook journalism, could use the Taff extract and claim fair dealing as a valid defence.

== Bibliography ==
- Aplin, Tanya; Davis, Jennifer (2009). Intellectual Property Law: Text, Cases, and Materials. Oxford University Press. ISBN 978-0-19-927157-3.
- Bently, Lionel; Sherman, Brad (2009). Intellectual Property Law (3rd ed.). Oxford University Press. ISBN 978-0-19-929204-2.
