= Harry Woolf, Baron Woolf =

British life peer and retired barrister and judge (born 1933)

The Right Honourable The Lord Woolf CH PC FBA FMedSci
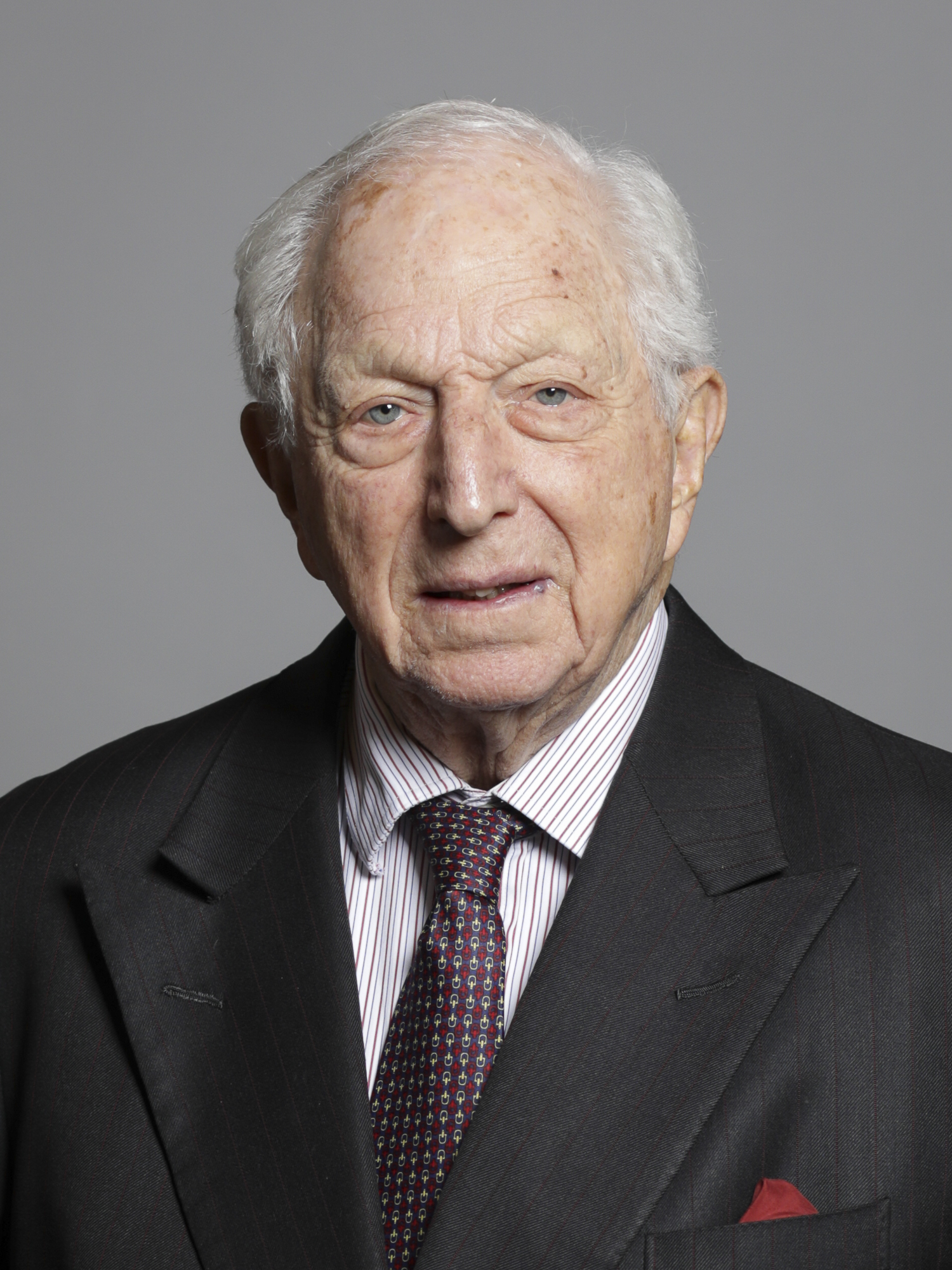
- Woolf in 2020

Lord Chief Justice of England and Wales
- In office 6 June 2000 – 1 October 2005
- Nominated by: Lord Irvine
- Appointed by: Elizabeth II
- Deputy: The Lord Judge
- Preceded by: The Lord Bingham of Cornhill
- Succeeded by: The Lord Phillips of Worth Matravers

Master of the Rolls
- In office 4 June 1996 – 6 June 2000
- Preceded by: Sir Thomas Bingham
- Succeeded by: The Lord Phillips of Worth Matravers

Lord of Appeal in Ordinary
- In office 1 October 1992 – 4 June 1996
- Preceded by: The Lord Ackner
- Succeeded by: The Lord Hutton

Member of the House of Lords
- Lord Temporal
- Lord of Appeal in Ordinary; 1 October 1992

Personal details
- Born: 2 May 1933 (age 93) Newcastle upon Tyne, Northumberland, England
- Spouse: Marguerite Sassoon (m. 1961)
- Children: 3
- Education: University College London
- Occupation: Judge

Harry Kenneth Woolf, Baron Woolf (born 2 May 1933) is a British life peer and retired barrister and judge. He was Master of the Rolls from 1996 until 2000 and Lord Chief Justice of England and Wales from 2000 until 2005. The Constitutional Reform Act 2005 made him the first Lord Chief Justice to be President of the Courts of England and Wales. He was a Non-Permanent Judge of the Court of Final Appeal of Hong Kong from 2003 to 2012. He sits in the House of Lords as a crossbencher.

== Early life ==
Woolf was born in Newcastle upon Tyne, on 2 May 1933, to Alexander Susman Woolf and his wife Leah (née Cussins). His grandfather Harry was a naturalised Briton of Polish and Russian Jewish origins. His father had been a fine art dealer, but was persuaded to run his own building business instead by his wife. They had four children, but their first child died, and his mother was protective of the three surviving children. Woolf lived in Newcastle-upon-Tyne until he was about five years old, when his family moved to Glasgow, Scotland, where he attended Glasgow Academy going on to Fettes College, an Edinburgh public school, where he mostly enjoyed his time and had supportive friends.

Woolf formed much of his sense of justice and fairness from his experiences at Fettes College. On one occasion while combing his hair, Woolf leaned into a neighbouring dormitory cubicle to use the mirror. A prefect reported this as the school had strict rules about being in other pupils' cubicles, but Woolf felt that he had not broken the rules because he did not have his feet inside the cubicle at the time. He appealed for fairness, but his housemaster, who had been in the army, increased Woolf's punishment from six strokes of the cane to eight.

Woolf had read books about lawyers and wanted to be a barrister. His housemaster told him that this was not a suitable career-choice for him because he had a stutter, but this only made Woolf more determined in his vocation. His A level results gained him a place at the University of Cambridge; however, he studied law at University College London (UCL) instead, as a consequence of his parents' move to London at about that time.

== Legal career ==
Woolf chose to be a barrister in 1955 and began practising on the Oxford circuit. He became Junior Counsel to the Inland Revenue (Common Law) from 1973 to 1974, and was promoted to First Junior Treasury Counsel (Common Law) from 1974 to 1979.

A significant part of his practice as the "Treasury Devil" was in the development of the nascent Administrative Law from four ancient Prerogative Writs. Before the Administrative Court was established, almost all judicial reviews were heard before the Lord Chief Justice sitting in a Divisional Court of the Queen's Bench Division, with Woolf commonly appearing for the Crown.

When he took silk he was almost immediately appointed as a High Court judge in that Division in 1979, aged 45, and received the customary knighthood.

Woolf was promoted to Lord Justice of Appeal and automatically made a member of Her Majesty's Most Honourable Privy Council (PC) in 1986.

=== Woolf Inquiry ===
Lord Justice Woolf was appointed to hold a five-month public inquiry with Her Majesty's Chief Inspector of Prisons, Judge Stephen Tumim, into the disturbances at Strangeways prison, Manchester and other prisons between 11 June on 31 October 1990. His inquiry sent letters to every prisoner and prison officer in the country. The Woolf Report, quoting many of the 1700 replies, was published on 25 February 1991, and blamed the loss of control of the Strangeways prison on the prison officers abandoning the gates outside the chapel, which "effectively handed the prison to the prisoners".

More fundamentally, however, Woolf blamed the "intolerable" conditions inside Strangeways in the months leading up to the riots and a "combination of errors" by the prison staff and Prison Service management as a central contributing factor. Finally, he blamed the failure of successive governments to "provide the resources to the Prison Service which were needed to enable the Service to provide for an increased prison population in a humane manner". Woolf recommended major reform of the Prison Service, and made 12 key recommendations with 204 accompanying proposals. He subsequently became patron of the Rehabilitation for Addicted Prisoners Trust and an Ambassador for the Prison Advice and Care Trust.

=== Master of the Rolls and Lord Chief Justice ===
Woolf LJ was appointed a Law Lord on 1 October 1992, being created a life peer as Baron Woolf, of Barnes in the London Borough of Richmond. Woolf gave few judgments on the Appellate Committee, being promoted to Master of the Rolls on 4 June 1996, a role in which he presided over Chancery law in the Court of Appeal.

In 1998 Woolf was also the head of the committee that modernised civil procedure, and incidentally excised most Latin terms from English law in an effort to make it more accessible (such as changing the word "plaintiff" to "claimant"). The Civil Procedure Rules 1998 are a direct result of this work.

On 6 June 2000 he finally succeeded Lord Bingham of Cornhill as Lord Chief Justice. In this most senior judicial post, Woolf spoke out at the University of Cambridge in 2004 against the Constitutional Reform Bill that would create a Supreme Court of the United Kingdom to replace the House of Lords as the final court of appeal in the United Kingdom; and he severely questioned the Lord Chancellor's and the Government's handling of recent constitutional reforms. He delayed his retirement as Lord Chief Justice until these issues had been resolved.

In 2003, he was appointed a Non-Permanent Judge of the Court of Final Appeal of Hong Kong, which position he held until 2012.

On his retirement as Lord Chief Justice on 1 October 2005, Woolf joined Blackstone Chambers as a mediator and arbitrator. From September to December 2005 he conducted a review of the working methods of the European Court of Human Rights, and he is chairman of the Bank of England Financial Markets Law Committee.

=== Other appointments ===
Among other work, Woolf has been serving as Chancellor of the Open University of Israel since 2004. He is Chairman of the Institute of Advanced Legal Studies, Chairman of the Council of University College, London and a visiting Professor of Law. He is a member of the House of Lords Constitution Committee.

In 2006 he was chairman of the Judging Panel of the FIRST Responsible Capitalism Awards. On 25 February 2007, Woolf was inaugurated as the first President of the Qatar Financial Centre Civil and Commercial Court, in Doha, Qatar.

On 15 June 2007, he took the chair of an Ethics Committee set up by BAE Systems, the UK's largest arms company, in response to allegations of multimillion-pound bribery in arms deals with Saudi Arabia. This Woolf Committee reported in May 2008, and clearly influenced the Law Commission report proposing anti-corruption and bribery law reforms on 20 November 2008 and the Government's consequent Bribery Bill published on 25 March 2009, which was ultimately enacted as the Bribery Act.

In 2007 he was named as co-chair, with Professor Kaufmann-Kohler, of the Commission on Settlement in International Arbitration, for the Centre for Effective Dispute Resolution for which he also consults.

From 29–31 May 2009, Woolf served with Sir William Blair, a High Court Judge, as the Co-Convener of the inaugural Qatar Law Forum of Global Leaders in Law, held in Doha, Qatar.

In 2018, Woolf was appointed the Head Justice of the Astana International Financial Centre Court in Astana, Kazakhstan.

== Selected judgments ==
- On 26 July 1983, Woolf's judgment in the high court, Gillick v West Norfolk & Wisbech AHA & DHSS [1983] 3 WLR (QBD), clarified the law under which doctors could prescribe contraception to minors.
- On 6 February 1997, three judges, led by Woolf, Master of the Rolls, said that the Human Fertilisation and Embryology Authority (HFEA) had failed to exercise discretion when it denied Diane Blood the right to have her dead husband's child in March 1995. The decision allowed Blood to have a child using her former husband's sperm, which was obtained shortly before he died.
- Pearce v United Bristol Healthcare NHS Trust [1999] PIQR 53.
- In October 2000, Woolf reduced the minimum sentence of Jon Venables and Robert Thompson for the murder of James Bulger by two years in recognition of their good behaviour and remorse shown while in detention, effectively restoring the original trial judge's eight-year recommended minimum sentence.
- In July 2002, Woolf, together with Mr Justice Curtis and Mr Justice Henriques, refused Barry George's first appeal against his conviction for the murder of Jill Dando. However, in November 2007, the next Lord Chief Justice, Lord Phillips, in the light of further expert opinions of the forensic evidence, declared George's conviction "unsafe" and also ordered a retrial. George was held in custody pending retrial and following an eight-week hearing he was acquitted on 1 August 2008.

Other judgments include:

- Vaughan v Barlow Clowes International Ltd [1991] EWCA Civ 11 - English trusts law, concerning tracing
- Fitzpatrick v British Railways Board [1992] ICR 221, [1992] IRLR 376 - UK labour law, concerning collective bargaining

== Personal life ==
Woolf, an Ashkenazi Jew, first met his wife Marguerite Sassoon, a Sephardi Jew, at a social event which was organised by a mutual friend at the National Liberal Club. They married early in 1961 and have three sons who have all entered the legal profession, as well as seven grandchildren.

Woolf was a member of the American Philosophical Society (1977) and the American Academy of Arts and Sciences (1983). He was elected an Honorary Fellow of the British Academy (FBA) in 2000 and an Honorary Fellow of the Academy of Medical Sciences (FMedSci) in 2002.

In the 2015 Queen's Birthday Honours, he was appointed a Member of the Order of the Companions of Honour (CH). In the same year, he was awarded the Gold Bauhinia Star by the Chief Executive of Hong Kong.

== Arms ==
Coat of arms of Harry Woolf, Baron Woolf
Adopted 2007 Coronet Coronet of a Baron Crest Upon a Helm with a Wreath Argent and Sable a Wolf sejant erect Sable gorged with a plain Collar attached thereto a Chain reflexed over the back Or and grasping in the dexter forepaw a Sword erect Argent hilt pommel and quillons Or Escutcheon Per pale Sable and Argent per fess indented of two points downwards counter¬changed three Harps the pillar of each terminating in the head neck and wings of a Pegasus in the Sable Or in the Argent Sable Supporters On the dexter a Wolf Or gorged with a plain Collar attached thereto a Chain reflexed over the back Sable and grasping in the interior forepaw a Sword bendwise Argent hilt pommel and quillons Sable on the sinister a Wolf Sable gorged with a plain collar attached thereto a Chain reflexed over the back Or and grasping in the interior forepaw a Sword bendwise sinister Argent hilt pommel and quillons Or Motto FOR FAMILY AND JUSTICE Badge A Harp the pillar terminating in the head neck and wings of a Pegasus Or Symbolism The per fess formation suggests the initial W. The wolves are clearly a punning allusion (wolves and Woolfes) and the swords refer to the Law. The Harp in the Arms and Badge is taken from the attributed arms of King David and is combined with the Pegasus of the Inner Temple.

== Sources ==
- Press Release on QFC Court appointment
- CV from Blackstone Chambers. Retrieved 27 August 2008.
- Speech by his successor
- An Uncommon Lawyer

Legal offices
Preceded by The Lord Bingham of Cornhill	Master of the Rolls; 1996 – 2000	Succeeded by The Lord Phillips of Worth Matravers
Preceded by The Lord Bingham of Cornhill	Lord Chief Justice; 2000 – 2005	Succeeded by The Lord Phillips of Worth Matravers
Orders of precedence in the United Kingdom
Preceded by The Lord Plant of Highfield	Gentlemen; Baron Woolf	Followed by The Lord Haskel
