= Re Sevenoaks Stationers (Retail) Ltd =

- Court: Court of Appeal of England and Wales
- Citation: [1991] Ch 164

Case opinions
- Dillon LJ

Keywords
- Disqualification, unfitness

Re Sevenoaks Stationers (Retail) Ltd [1991] Ch 164 is a UK company law case concerning the test of being unfit to run a company under the Company Directors Disqualification Act 1986 section 6.

== Facts ==
Mr Cruddas was a chartered accountant and director of five insolvent companies, debt amounting to £600,000. He did not keep proper accounting records, failed to ensure annual returns were filed, and that annual accounts were prepared and audited, caused more debt when he knew of severe financial difficulty, traded while insolvent, did not pay the Crown debts for PAYE, NIC and VAT. Mr Cruddas had, though, remortgaged his house to raise money to pay creditors, losing over £200K. But he only paid creditors who pressed for it.

== Judgment ==
Dillon LJ held that he was unfit to be concerned with management under the CDDA 1986 section 6. He noted that this was the first case of disqualification up to the Court of Appeal. In deciding how much of 15 years to disqualify, only serious cases, which may include someone who was already disqualified should be for ten years and above; for six to ten years are those who do not merit the top bracket and for two to five years, not very serious cases. Here a five-year disqualification was appropriate.

Taking that view of the Crown debts in Rochester and Retail, and adding to it (i) that there were never any audited accounts of any of the five companies, let alone registered accounts, (ii) the inadequacy of the accounting records of Retail, (iii) the loan by Retail to Rochester, (iv) the payment of debts of Hoo Paper by Hoo Waste Paper, (v) the guarantee given by Sevenoaks Stationers for liabilities of Hoo Paper, (vi) the continued trading while insolvent and known to be in difficulties of Rochester and Retail, and (vii) the extent of the deficiency in each company after a relatively short period of trading, I have no doubt at all that it is amply proved that Mr. Cruddas is unfit to be concerned in the management of a company. His trouble is not dishonesty, but incompetence or negligence in a very marked degree and that is enough to render him unfit; I do not think it is necessary for incompetence to be “total”, as suggested by the Vice-Chancellor in Re Lo-Line Electric Motors Ltd, to render a director unfit to take part in the management of a company.

== See also ==
- UK company law
