= Fitzpatrick v British Railways Board =

1992 UK labour law case

- Socialist Action (UK)
- Court: Court of Appeal
- Citation: [1992] ICR 221, [1992] IRLR 376

Court membership
- Judges sitting: Woolf LJ, Dillon LJ, Leggatt LJ

Keywords
- Trade union, collective bargaining

Fitzpatrick v British Railways Board [1992] ICR 221 is a UK labour law case, concerning collective bargaining.

== Facts ==
Ms Fitzpatrick concealed a period of employment when she was working for Ford, but was dismissed after 9 days for bad references. An Evening Standard article had revealed, after she had been working for a few months with the British Railways Board, she had been a member of a Trotskyist group called Socialist Action (UK). She was dismissed for ‘untruthfulness and lack of trust’. Ms Fitzpatrick claimed the dismissal was unlawful, as it was because of her trade union activity.

== Judgment ==
Woolf LJ held that Ms Fitzpatrick was unlawfully dismissed under the Employment Protection (Consolidation) Act 1978 section 58 (now TULRCA 1992 section 152), and reversed the Tribunal. She was dismissed not for ‘deceit’ but because of her ‘previous trade union (and possibly her political) activities, which gave her a reputation for being a disruptive force; and that was the prime reason for her dismissal.’

The reason that the majority of the industrial tribunal did not address the critical question is probably because of their understanding of the Beyer decision [1977] I.R.L.R. 211 . They say, having examined that decision, that so far as proposed activities are concerned it must, and I quote: “involve some cogent and identifiable act and not some possible trouble in the future.” In other words the industrial tribunal are saying that in order to comply with the provisions of section 58(1)(b) there must have been some activity on the part of the employee to which they took exception, which was not a mere possibility but something which was sufficiently precise to be identifiable in her present employment.

In my judgment, to adopt this approach is to read into the language of section 58(1)(b) a restriction which Parliament has not identified. To limit the language, in the way which the industrial tribunal did, would prevent the actual reason for the dismissal in a case such as this from being considered by the industrial tribunal. As long as the reason which motivated the employer falls within the words “activities that the employee … proposed to take part in,” there is no reason to limit the language. The purpose of the subsection, in so far as (b) is concerned, is to protect those who engage in trade union activities and I can see no reason why that should not apply irrespective of whether the precise activities can be identified.

If an employer, having learnt of an employee's previous trade union activities, decides that he wishes to dismiss that employee, that is likely to be a situation where almost inevitably the employer is dismissing the employee because he feels that the employee will indulge in industrial activities of a trade union nature in his current employment. There is no reason for a rational and reasonable employer to object to the previous activities of an employee except in so far as they will impinge upon the employee's current employment.

Dillon LJ and Leggatt LJ concurred.

== See also ==
- UK labour law
