= Powdrill v Watson =

- Court: House of Lords
- Full case name: Powdrill v Watson, Talbot v Cadge
- Citation: [1995] 2 AC 394, [1995] 2 WLR 312

Court membership
- Judges sitting: Lord Browne-Wilkinson, Lord Keith, Lord Mustill, Lord Lloyd

Keywords
- Administration

Powdrill v Watson [1995] 2 AC 394 is a UK insolvency law case concerning the administration procedure when a company is unable to repay its debts.

== Facts ==
Roger Powdrill was a joint administrator of Paramount Airways Ltd, a short haul aircraft carrier. He wrote to all the employees in the company, including John Watson, saying that the company would keep on paying the employees but was not in any way assuming personal liability. This case was joined with cases where administrative receivers had done the same though making explicit they were not adopting the employee's contracts of employment. This included John Talbot who was in charge of both Leyland DAF Ltd and Ferranti International plc. Mr Watson's contract was then terminated. He wanted to be paid for his work. He argued that he stood in priority under Insolvency Act 1986 section 19(5) (see now Insolvency Act 1986, Schedule B1) for wages over a two months’ notice period. In Talbot's case, he simply issued applications asking whether they had in fact adopted the contracts under the Insolvency Act 1986, section 44.

Evans-Lombe J in the High Court [1993] BCC 662 held the contracts were adopted. Dillon LJ, Leggatt LJ and Henry LJ in the Court of Appeal (reported at [1994] BCC 172) dismissed the appeals.

== Judgment ==
Lord Browne-Wilkinson held that IA 1986 sections 19 and 44 meant that a contract was adopted where the administrator or receiver's conduct amounted to an election to treat the contract as adopted. It was inevitably so after 14 days following appointment and could not be unilaterally avoided. Under section 19 priority was only given to liability on wages incurred by the administrator during his tenure in office, and that did include liability for the period of notice, but not holiday pay accruing before appointment.

Lord Keith, Lord Mustill and Lord Lloyd concurred.

== See also ==
- UK insolvency law
