= Johnstone v Bloomsbury HA =

English legal decision on whether an implied term can override an express term

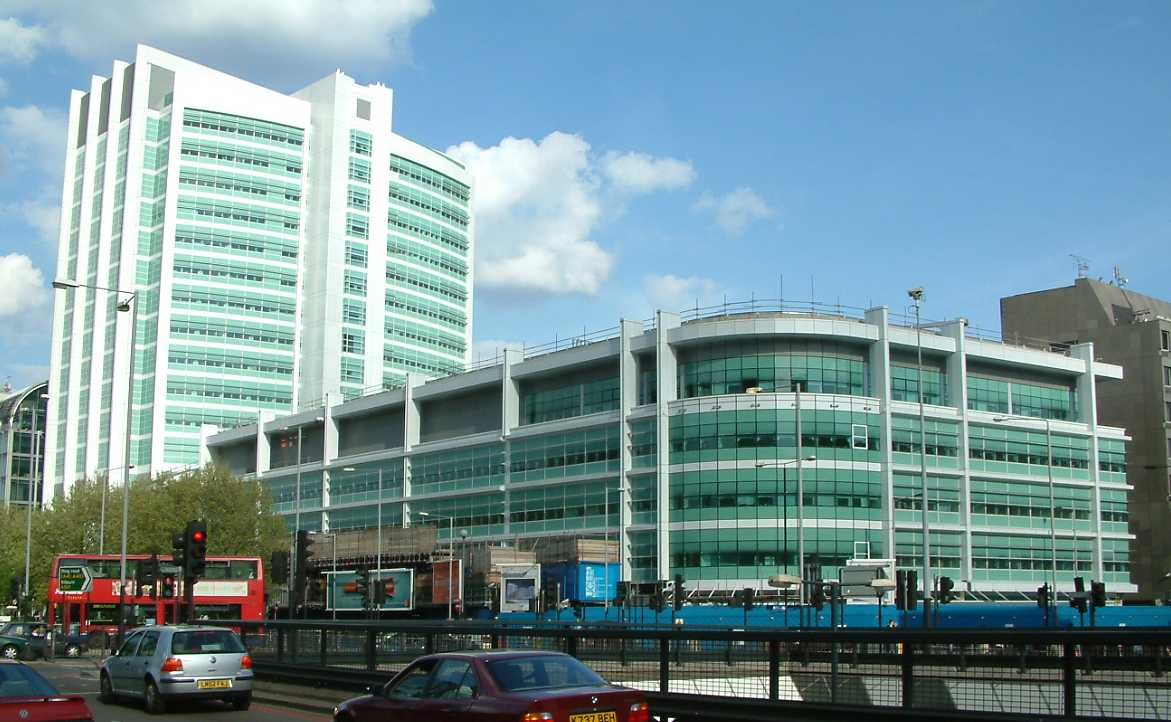
- UCL Hospital
- Court: Court of Appeal
- Citation: [1992] QB 333, [1991] 2 WLR 1362, [1991] 2 All ER 293

Court membership
- Judges sitting: Stuart-Smith LJ, Leggatt LJ, Browne-Wilkinson VC

Keywords
- Unfair terms, implied terms

Johnstone v Bloomsbury Health Authority [1992] QB 333 is an English contract law case, concerning implied terms and unfair terms under the Unfair Contract Terms Act 1977.

== Facts ==
Dr Chris Johnstone was a junior doctor in the Obstetric Department at the University College Hospital. According to para 4(b) of his contract, he was expected to be available on call for 48 hours a week on average, on top of his 40-hour contract. His first claim was that it was a breach of the duty of care to have a contract which could cause foreseeable injury. His alternative claim was that the clause allowing him to be so long on call was contrary to the Unfair Contract Terms Act 1977 section 2(1).

Stephen Sedley QC represented Dr Johnstone.

== Judgment ==
The Court of Appeal held that Bloomsbury Health Authority had to pay damages for the harm to Dr Johnstone's health, and by a majority based this decision on the common law, but for different reasons.

Stuart-Smith LJ held that an implied term in law can prevail over an express term. He set out that there was a Duty A to be available for 48 hours, on top of 40 hours and a Duty B on the authority to not injure the employee's health. The Authority had the power to make the employee work 88 hours a week on average. "But that power had to be exercised in the light of the other contractual terms and in particular their duty to take care for his safety". As Lord Thankerton said in Wilsons and Clyde Coal Ltd v English [1938] AC 57, 67, "when a workman contracts to do work, he is not to be held as having agreed to hold the master immune from the latter’s liability for want of due care in the provision of a reasonably safe system of working". He also held that the Unfair Contract Terms Act 1977 (UCTA) s 2(1) would invalidate an 88-hour working week. He concluded saying that Bloomsbury Health Authority could only succeed if it showed the clause was an express assumption, or volenti, but then it would still fall under UCTA 1977 through s 1(1). He finished by saying that it was a matter of "grave public concern" and Parliament should do something.

Leggatt LJ, dissenting on the common law point of implied terms, would have held, that tort cannot trump contract, as counsel Mr Beloff put it. However he did say that para 4(b) could be void under UCTA 1977.

Before he accepted that obligation he knew what it would entail. It may indeed be scandalous that junior doctors should not now be offered more civilised terms of service in our hospitals; ... But these are matters for negotiation by their association, or in default for amelioration by the legislature ... On the result, if the plaintiff fell sick during the performance of his employment by the defendants because it was too arduous for him, he did not do so by reason of any relevant breach of duty on the defendants' part.

Browne-Wilkinson VC said the implied term would circumscribe the scope of the express term, so that both coexist without conflict. When exercising its discretion about how long Dr Johnstone should work for, it would have to do so subject to its duty to not injure him. He stated the following.

In my judgment there must be some restriction on the defendants' rights. In any sphere of employment other than that of junior hospital doctors, an obligation to work up to 88 hours in any one week would be rightly regarded as oppressive and intolerable. But even that is not the limit of what the defendants claim. Since the plaintiff's obligation is to be available "on average" for 48 hours per week, the defendants claim to be entitled to require him to work more than 88 hours in some weeks regardless of possible injury to his health. Thus the plaintiff alleges that he was required to work for 100 hours during one week in February 1989 and 105 hours during another week in March 1989. How far can this go? Could the defendants demand of the plaintiff that he worked 130 hours (out of the total of 168 hours available) in any one week even if this would manifestly involve injury to his health? In my judgment the defendants' right to call for overtime under clause 4(b) is not an absolute right but must be limited in some way. There is no technical legal reason why the defendants' discretion to call for overtime should not be exercised in conformity with the normal implied duty to take reasonable care not to injure their employee's health.

== See also ==
- English contract law
- Unfair Contract Terms Act 1977
- Unfair Contract Terms Bill
- Interpreting contracts in English law
- Mahmud and Malik v Bank of Credit and Commerce International SA [1998] AC 20
