= Taylor v Plumer =

- Court: Court of Appeal in Chancery
- Citations: [1815] EWHC KB J84, (1815) 3 M&S 562

Keywords
- Tracing

Taylor v Plumer [1815] EWHC KB J84 is an English trusts law case, concerning tracing of assets which were wrongfully taken in breach of trust.

== Facts ==
Sir Thomas Plumer gave his broker, Mr Walsh, a draft on his bankers for £22,200 to invest in exchequer bills. Mr Walsh cashed the draft, and got bank notes. He bought £6500 in exchequer bills, and with the balance he got American securities, paying with the bank notes. But he gave one note to his brother in law, in return for his bankers' draft of £500. He then bought 71½ doubloons, with the intention of escaping to North America via Lisbon. Sir Thomas' attorney caught him at Falmouth, and secured a return of the American securities and bullion. Mr Walsh was indicted, tried, found guilty, but pardoned, and then declared bankrupt. His assignees in bankruptcy brought an action in trover against Sir Thomas.

== Judgment ==
Lord Ellenborough held that Sir Thomas had never ceased to be the lawful proprietor.

The plaintiff is not entitled to recover if the defendant has succeeded in maintaining these propositions in point of law - viz., that the property of a principal entrusted by him to his factor for any special purpose belongs to the principal, notwithstanding any change which that property may have undergone in point of form, so long as such property is capable of being identified, and distinguished from all other property… It makes no difference in reason or law into what other form, different from the original, the change may have been made, whether it be into that of promissory notes for the security of the money which was produced by the sale of the goods of the principal, as in Scott v Surman, or into other merchandise, as in Whitecomb v Jacob, for the product of or substitute for the original thing still follows the nature of the thing itself, as long as it can be ascertained to be such, and the right only ceases when the means of ascertainment fail, which is the case when the subject is turned into money, and mixed and confounded in a general mass of the same description.

Although decided in a common law court, Millett LJ in Jones v Jones noted that it was in fact decided under equitable principles. But Millett LJ further noted that substitution has been acknowledged under common law anywhow, for example in Bankque Belge v Hambrouck.

== See also ==
- English trusts law
