= Environment Agency v Clark =

Environment Agency v Clark [2001] Ch 57 (also, Re Rhondda Waste Disposal Ltd) is a UK insolvency law case concerning the right of creditors to bring proceedings against insolvent companies in administration. It concerned s.10, Insolvency Act 1986, now Schedule B1, para. 43(6) whereby a moratorium on legal proceedings is effected after an administration order takes place.

== Facts ==
Rhondda Waste Disposal Ltd, a company wholly owned by Rhondda Cynon Taf County Borough Council ran a landfill site under a waste management licence in Nant-y-Gwyddon, Rhondda Valley. The Environment Agency served an enforcement notice against Rhondda, telling it to comply with its licence terms, under s.33(6), Environmental Protection Act 1990. It then got an injunction. Rhondda failed to change in the next six months. So Rhondda petitioned for an administration order. The administrator asked the court to clarify whether the Environment Agency needed leave under the Insolvency Act 1986, s.10(1)(c) and s.11(3)(d) to bring criminal prosecutions.

Judge Moseley QC, Deputy High Court Judge of the Chancery Division, held it did. The Environment Agency appealed, arguing the words "other proceedings" in the sections were not intended to cover environmental and criminal proceedings, but only recovery of money.

== Judgment ==
Scott Baker J, speaking for the Court of Appeal (Henry LJ and Robert Walker LJ) held that the moratorium on "other proceedings" plainly meant all proceedings, including criminal proceedings. So the Environment Agency needed permission before prosecuting. This was because other sections in the Act referred to criminal offences, so on a proper construction, criminal proceedings would have been excluded specifically if that had been intended.

The purpose of the Insolvency Act 1986 was to give a window of opportunity for the company to make proposals to creditors. Both criminal and civil proceedings would frustrate that. Moreover the broad range of offences could mean such an exception would work against creditors' interests. Courts concerned with administration are well placed to balance the arguments for and against leave. Scott Baker J also referred to remarks by Morritt J in the Re Celtic Extraction case, on the “polluter pays” principle. This should not be applied so that unsecured creditors pay to the whole extend of the available assets.

However, the judge had erred in refusing leave. The allegations of Rhondda's serious and long standing breaches of the Environmental Protection Act should not be overridden by creditors' interests.

Here, any fine that might be imposed on the company could only be paid at the expense of the creditors, since, although the company could pay, it could only do so out of assets available for distribution to the creditors.

== See also ==
- UK company law
