= Alec Lobb (Garages) Ltd. v Total Oil (GB) Ltd. =

English contract law court case

- Court: Court of Appeal of England and Wales
- Full case name: Alec Lobb (Garages) Limited & Ors v. Total Oil (GB) Limited
- Decided: November 8, 1984; 40 years ago
- Citations: [1984] EWCA Civ 2, [1985] 1 WLR 173

Court membership
- Judges sitting: Waller LJ, Dunn LJ, Dillon LJ

Keywords
- Undue influence

Alec Lobb (Garages) Ltd. v Total Oil (GB) Ltd. [1984] EWCA Civ 2 is an English contract law case concerned with undue influence.

== Facts ==
Mr. Lobb was the managing director of a small petrol station in South Street, Braintree, Essex. It had to buy petrol only from British branch of French oil company Total S.A. In 1969 he was in financial difficulty. Contrary to his solicitor's advice, he entered into a lease and lease back arrangement with a new tie agreement with Total Oil. This proved costly but eventually he paid off his debts. Ten years later, he asked for the agreement to be set aside as being a restraint of trade and unconscionable.

In the High Court, Mr Peter Millett QC, sitting as a deputy High Court judge, held that the agreement could not be set aside, and Mr Lobb appealed.

== Judgment ==
Dillon LJ held that it was not a restraint of trade or an unconscionable bargain and even if it had been, it would have been barred by the principle of laches.

The basis of the contention that the transaction of the Lease and Lease back ought to be set aside in equity is that it is submitted, and in the Court below was accepted on behalf of Total, that during the negotiations for the Lease and Lease back the parties did not have equal bargaining power, and it is therefore further submitted that a contract between parties who had unequal bargaining power can only stand and be enforced by the stronger if he can prove that the contract was in point of fact, fair, just and reasonable. The concept of unequal bargaining power is taken particularly from the judgment of Lord Denning MR in Lloyds Bank Ltd. v. Bundy [1975] QB 326. The reference to a contract only standing if it is proved to have been in point of fact fair, just and reasonable is taken from the judgment of Lord Selborne LC in Earl of Aylesbury v Morris LR 8 Ch.App 484 at 490-491. Lord Selborne was not there seeking to generalise; he was dealing only with what he regarded as one of the oldest heads of equity, relieving against fraud practised on heirs or expectants, particularly fraud practised on young noblemen of great expectations, considerable extravagance and no ready-money. It is none the less submitted that the logic of the development of the law leads to the conclusion that Lord Selborne's test should now be applied generally to any contract entered into between parties who did not have equal bargaining power.

In fact Lord Denning's judgment in Lloyds Bank Ltd. v. Bundy merely laid down the proposition that where there was unequal bargaining power the contract could not stand if the weaker did not have separate legal advice. In the present case Mr Lobb and the Company did have separate advice from their own solicitor. On the facts of this case, however, that does not weaken the appellants' case if the general proposition of law which they put forward is valid. Total refused to accept any of the modifications of the transaction as put forward by Total which the Company's and Mr Lobb's solicitor suggested, and in the end the solicitor advised them not to proceed. Mr Lobb declined to accept that advice because his and the Company's financial difficulties were so great, and, it may be said, their bargaining power was so small, that he felt he had no alternative but to accept Total's terms. Because of the existing valid tie to Total which had, as I have said, three to four years to run, he had no prospect at all of raising finance on the scale he required from any source other than Total. There is no suggestion that there was any other dealer readily available who could have bought the property from him subject to the tie. The only practical solutions open to him were to accept the terms of the Lease and Lease back as put forward by Total on which Total was not prepared to negotiate, or to sell the freehold of the property to Total and cease trading. In these circumstances, it would be unreal, in my judgment, to hold that if the transaction is otherwise tainted it is cured merely because Mr Lobb and the Company had independent advice.

But on the learned deputy Judge's findings can it be said that the transaction is tainted? Lord Selborne dealt with the case before him as a case of fraud. He said at pages 490-1: "The usury laws, however, proved to be an inconvenient fetter upon the liberty of commercial transactions; and the arbitrary rule of equity as to sales of reversions was an impediment to fair and reasonable, as well as to unconscionable, bargains. Both have been abolished by the Legislature; but the abolition of the usury laws still leaves the nature of the bargain capable of being a note of fraud in the estimation of this Court; and the Act as to sales of reversions (31 Vict. c. 4) is carefully limited to purchases "made bona fide and without fraud or unfair dealing", and leaves under-value still a material element in cases in which it is not the sole equitable ground for relief. These changes of the law have in no degree whatever altered the onus probandi in those cases, which, according to the language of Lord Hardwicke, raise "from the circumstances or conditions of the parties contracting — weakness on one side, usury on the other, or extortion, or advantage taken of that weakness" — a presumption of fraud. Fraud does not here mean deceit or circumvention; it means an unconscientious use of the power arising out of these circumstances and conditions; and when the relative position of the parties is such as prima facie to raise this presumption, the transaction cannot stand unless the person claiming the benefit of it is able to repel the presumption by contrary evidence, proving it to have been in point of fact fair, just, and reasonable."

The whole emphasis is on extortion, or undue advantage taken of weakness, an unconscientious use of the power arising out of the inequality of the parties' circumstances, and on unconscientious use of power which the Court might in certain circumstances be entitled to infer from a particular — and in these days notorious — relationship unless the contract is proved to have been in fact fair, just and reasonable. Nothing leads me to suppose that the course of the development of the law over the last 100 years has been such that the emphasis on unconscionable conduct or unconscientious use of power has gone and relief will now be granted in equity in a case such as the present if there has been unequal bargaining power, even if the stronger has not used his strength unconscionably. I agree with the judgment of Browne-Wilkinson J. in Multiservice Bookbinding Ltd v Marden [1979] Ch 84 which sets out that to establish that a term is unfair and unconscionable it is not enough to show that it is, objectively, unreasonable.

In the present case there are findings of fact by the learned Deputy Judge that the conduct of Total was not unconscionable, coercive or oppressive. There is ample evidence to support those findings and they are not challenged by the appellants. Their case is that the Judge applied the wrong test; where there is unequal bargaining power, the test is, they say, whether its terms are fair, just and reasonable and it is unnecessary to consider whether the conduct of the stronger party was oppressive or unconscionable. I do not accept the appellants' proposition of law. In my judgment the findings of the learned Judge conclude this ground of appeal against the appellants.

Inequality of bargaining power must anyhow be a relative concept. It is seldom in any negotiation that the bargaining powers of the parties are absolutely equal. Any individual wanting to borrow money from a bank, building society or other financial institution in order to pay his liabilities or buy some property he urgently wants to acquire will have virtually no bargaining power; he will have to take or leave the terms offered to him. So, with house property in a seller's market, the purchaser will not have equal bargaining power with the vendor. But Lord Denning did not envisage that any contract entered into in such circumstances would, without more, be reviewed by the Courts by the objective criterion of what was reasonable. See Lloyds Bank Ltd. v. Bundy at page 336. The Courts would only interfere in exceptional cases where as a matter of common fairness it was not right that the strong should be allowed to push the weak to the wall. The concepts of unconscionable conduct and of the exercise by the stronger of coercive power are thus brought in, and in the present case they are negatived by the deputy Judge's findings.

Even if, contrary to my view just expressed, the Company and Mr and Mrs Lobb had initially in 1969 a valid claim in equity to have the Lease and Lease back set aside as a result of the inequality of bargaining power, that claim was, in my judgment, barred by laches well before the issue of the Writ in this action.

Leave to appeal to the House of Lords was refused.

== See also ==
- English contract law
- Iniquitous pressure in English law
- Lloyds Bank Ltd. v Bundy [1975] QB 326
- Williams v. Walker-Thomas Furniture Co. 350 F.2d 445 (C.A. D.C. 1965)
