= Fair dealing in United Kingdom law =

Doctrine in UK copyright law

Fair dealing in United Kingdom law is a doctrine which provides an exception to United Kingdom copyright law, in cases where the copyright infringement is for the purposes of non-commercial research or study, criticism or review, or for the reporting of current events. More limited than the United States doctrine of fair use, fair dealing originates in Sections 29 and 30 of the Copyright, Designs and Patents Act 1988, and requires the infringer to show not only that their copying falls into one of the three fair dealing categories, but also that it is "fair" and, in some cases, that it contains sufficient acknowledgement for the original author. Factors when deciding the "fairness" of the copying can include the quantity of the work taken, whether it was previously published, the motives of the infringer and what the consequences of the infringement on the original author's returns for the copyrighted work will be.

Research and study does not apply to commercial research, and does not include infringements of broadcasts, sound recordings or film; it also has only a limited application to software. These exclusions have been criticised as failing "to reflect the increasing importance of non-textual media for both study and research". Research cannot be private, and in a non-academic setting must also not have a future potential commercial purpose. This exception also excludes, under Section 29(3)(b) of the 1988 Act, copying which will result in "copies of substantially the same material being provided to more than one person at substantially the same time and for substantially the same purpose". Criticism or review is interpreted liberally, and may include criticism or review of a work's social or moral implications or its impact, but this exception is only available when the work in question has been previously made available to the public. Reporting of current events is only an exception where the event is "current", and may exclude trivial or ephemeral news; such news can, however, become an "event" through media coverage.

== Definition ==
Fair dealing is an exception to United Kingdom copyright law which allows for the use of copyrighted works without licensing in certain circumstances. It is governed by Sections 29 and 30 of the Copyright, Designs and Patents Act 1988, which provide three types of situation in which fair dealing is a valid defence: where the use is for the purposes of research or private study, where it is to allow for criticism or review, and where it is for the purpose of reporting current events. This can be contrasted with the United States doctrine of fair use, which provides a general defence rather than rigid and specific categories of acceptable behaviour. Under United Kingdom law, an infringer relying on fair dealing as a defence must show that their actions fall into a specific category of acceptable use, as opposed to the "illustrative open list of purposes" in US law. The fair dealing exceptions had previously been formalised in case law as "fair use" forms, but this was eliminated by the Copyright Act 1911 (1 & 2 Geo. 5. c. 46).

== Fair dealing ==
Fair dealing is a defence after the fact. If sued for copyright infringement, one can rely on fair dealing as a defence in court, but the defence "only comes into play once a claimant has established that copyright has been infringed. Where this occurs, the onus of proof [then] falls on the defendant to prove that one of the exceptions applies". This is done first by proving that the infringement falls within one of the three categories, which are liberally interpreted by the courts. The courts will not, however, give any consideration to what the infringer thought his work was for, or rely on a subjective test in any way; as in Hyde Park Residence v Yelland, it is not seen as necessary "for the court to put itself in the shoes of the infringer of the copyright". Instead, a more objective test is used, to avoid providing "any encouragement to the notion that all that is required is for the user to have a sincere belief, however misguided, that he or she is criticising a work or reporting current affairs".

If the copyright infringer can show that their use falls within one of the three categories, they must then show that the dealing was "fair". This takes into account a number of things, and due to the freedom of speech provisions under the Human Rights Act 1998 is deliberately intended not to be based on rigid and inflexible tests. Instead, as in Ashdown v Telegraph Group Ltd, the courts "bear in mind that considerations of public interest are paramount". Because of this, there are many different things which enhance or detract from the "fair" nature of the dealing. If the copyrighted work had not been "made available to the public" at the time, this will count against the use being fair, and makes the defence on the grounds of criticism and review "unavailable". The courts will give different weight to different kinds of documents; a series of private letters which have not been published will detract more from the fairness of the infringement than unpublished official reports which discuss matters of public interest.

How the work was obtained and for what purpose is also a factor. If the work was obtained illegally or unethically, the dealing is less likely to be "fair" than if it was legitimately acquired. Similarly, if the motives of the dealing are negative, the fairness will be impugned. As in Hyde Park, the court must "judge the fairness by the objective standard of whether a fair minded and honest person would have dealt with the copyright work in the manner" in question. Consequences are also a factor; if, as in Hubbard v Vosper, the parties to the case are competitors and infringing on the work acts as an alternative to purchasing the original, this will limit the fairness of the dealing. Occasionally the courts will also consider whether the purpose of the infringement could have been achieved in a less intrusive way, as in Hyde Park.

The quantity of the work taken is also taken into account. If the infringer uses the majority of a copyrighted work, or all of it, they reduce the expected returns of the copyright owner and compromise "the role that copyright plays in encouraging creativity". As such, the fair dealing defence usually only applies when part of a work has been taken, although some judicial comments, such as those of Megaw LJ in Hubbard, state that there are a few cases in which the work is so short that reproducing it in its entirety may be acceptable. The use made of the work is another factor; if the infringer takes a copyrighted work and reorganises or reinterprets it, the courts are more likely to find that the dealing qualifies as fair than if the work is simply reproduced without modification or analysis. In some situations, the fair dealing defence must be accompanied by "sufficient acknowledgement", where the author and the original work must be identified either by the title or some other description.

=== Research and study ===
Under Section 29(1) of the 1988 Act, fair dealing is a valid defence when dealing with copyright infringement for the purpose of non-commercial research or private study. The exception also has only a limited application to things such as software.

For this defence to apply, the infringer must show that the dealing is for non-commercial research or private study, private study being defined by Section 178 as excluding any study directly or indirectly for commercial purpose; it therefore covers most academic purposes, but not things such as the use of a database in market-testing of new drugs. Research, when not academic, is covered by The Controller of Her Majesty's Stationery Office, Ordnance Survey v Green Amps Ltd, which sets the test as whether or not it is thought that the research would be used for a commercial purpose in the future. Although the precise distinction between research and private study has not historically been important, modern case law states that there is a difference. Unlike study, research cannot be private, as the exception to copyright law is justified because research provides a benefit to society as a whole. As with all fair dealing exceptions, copying for research or study purposes must also be "fair", taking into account the various factors mentioned above.

There are special cases, particularly when dealing with copying by third parties. If the person doing the copying is not the one doing the research, different rules apply; a publisher cannot use it to justify printing parts of other publishers works, as in Sillitoe v McGraw Hill, but in order to uphold the exception's justification, the courts do recognise that it can cover a research assistant making photocopies on behalf of a student or researcher. However, as a limitation, Section 29(3)(b) provides that the copying cannot be fair dealing if the person doing it knows that it will result in "copies of substantially the same material being provided to more than one person at substantially the same time and for substantially the same purpose". In other words, an academic cannot print off multiple copies of a work for students and then rely on the fair dealings exception.

=== Criticism or review ===
Section 30(1) of the 1988 Act provides that the fair dealing exception is valid if the material is being copied for criticism or review. For it to apply, the infringer must be able to show that the dealing was for criticism or review, that the infringed work was previously made available to the public, that the dealing was fair, and that the dealing was accompanied by an acknowledgement. The first step requires the defendant to show that the copying was done to criticise or review the work in question, the performance of the work, or, as in Beloff v Pressdram, another work. The courts will interpret "criticism or review" liberally, as in Newspaper Licensing Agency v Marks & Spencers plc, and as such the criticism or review can include the thought or philosophy of the work, as in Time Warner v Channel 4, or the social and moral implications of the work, as in Pro Sieben Media v Carlton Television.

The exception is only applicable where the work has previously been made available to the public "by any means" including the issuing of copies, lending copies, performing or exhibiting a copyrighted piece, or communicating it to the public. If the work has not been clearly made available not just to others but to the public in general, the exception does not apply, as in HRH the Prince of Wales v Associated Newspapers. Although Prince Charles had distributed copies of his diary to 75 people, this clearly did not make the journals available to the public, as each recipient was under strict instructions to keep the work confidential. The dealing must also be shown to have been fair, taking into account the many factors considered by the courts. Bently and Sherman suggest that in relation to fair dealings for criticism or review, the most relevant aspects considered by the court are likely to be the quantity taken, the method of acquisition and the consequences.

=== Reporting of current events ===
Under Section 30(2), fair dealing using any work for the purpose of reporting current events, with sufficient acknowledgement, is a valid exception to copyright. Photographs are excluded, however; Cornish, Llewelyn and Aplin write that this is "in order to preserve the full value of holding a unique visual record of some person or event". A crucial element of the "current events" exception is whether or not the reporting covers "current" events. "The older the issue, the less likely it is that it will be treated as having any currency". Hyde Park confirmed that, where an event that took place some time ago is still being discussed, that can be treated as "current". The nature of "events" must also be confirmed; while some things will be inherently considered events, such as matters of national importance, major sporting contests or important political occasions, others may not be. Matters that are "trivial, ephemeral or immaterial" may not be treated as events, although it has been confirmed that media attention can transform a trivial matter into an "event", as in Pro Sieben. The copyrighted works must also directly deal with the current events; Associated Newspapers v News Group Newspapers, for example, concerned the republication of correspondence between Wallis Simpson and her husband on the occasion of Simpson's death. It was held that the correspondence did not relate closely enough to the death for the fair dealing exception to apply.

The dealing must also be "fair", with the most important factors being the quantity of the work used, whether or not use of the copyrighted work is necessary, and whether or not the work has been previously published. The Court of Appeal has confirmed in Ashdown that the defence should always be available "where the public interest in learning of the very words written by the owner of the copyright is such that the publication should not be inhibited by the chilling factor of having to pay damages or account of profits". Sufficient acknowledgement to the original author is also necessary for all works where the fair dealing exception is applied. Under Section 30(3), however, this is not required for reporting via a sound recording, film or broadcast where it would be "impossible for reasons of practicality or otherwise".

=== Parody, caricature and pastiche ===
As of 1 October 2014, Section 30A provides for fair dealing as a defence in cases where the infringement was for the purpose of caricature, parody or pastiche. The Intellectual Property Office suggests that a "parody" is something that imitates a work for humorous or satirical effect, a "pastiche" is a composition that is made up of selections from various sources or one that imitates the style of another artist or period, and that a "caricature" is something that portrays its subject in a simplified or exaggerated way, whether insulting or complimentary and whether for a political purpose or solely for entertainment.

=== Quotation ===
The same 2014 amendment also broadened the scope of the fair dealing defence for the "quotation" of suitably acknowledged published works for the purposes of "criticism or review", to "criticism, review or otherwise."

== Enforcement and procedure ==
If a claim of copyright infringement is brought and the copyright holder seeks an interim injunction restricting publication, courts will not usually grant this if the defendant pleads fair dealing.

== Bibliography ==
- Aplin, Tanya; Davis, Jennifer (2009). Intellectual Property Law: Text, Cases, and Materials. Oxford University Press. ISBN 978-0-19-927157-3.
- Bently, Lionel; Sherman, Brad (2009). Intellectual Property Law (3rd ed.). Oxford University Press. ISBN 978-0-19-929204-2.
- Burrell, Robert; Coleman, Allison (2005). Copyright Exceptions: The Digital Impact. Cambridge Studies in Intellectual Property Rights. Cambridge University Press. ISBN 0-521-84726-5.
- Cornish, William; Llewelyn, David; Aplin, Tanya (2010). Intellectual Property: Patents, Copyright, Trademarks and Allied Rights (7th ed.). Sweet & Maxwell. ISBN 978-1-84703-923-1.
