= Burgess v Rawnsley =

- Court: Court of Appeal
- Citation: [1975] Ch 429

Case opinions
- Lord Denning MR

Keywords
- Co-ownership

Burgess v Rawnsley [1975] Ch 429 is an English land law case, concerning co-ownership of land, and the conditions for severance of a joint tenancy in a circumstances where there is not a domestic relationship, that is two or more owners living together, co-occupancy.

== Facts ==
Mr Honick and Mrs Rawnsley were joint tenants, but Mr Honick occupied the property alone. They bought it thinking they would both live there. Mr Honick was thinking of marriage, but Mrs Rawnsley intended to live alone in the upstairs flat, as they found out after. Mrs Rawnsley did not move in and they agreed orally she would sell her share for £750. But then she changed her mind and wanted more. Later on, Mr Honick died. The house was sold and his administratrix, Mrs Burgess, wanted to establish severance to get half the sale proceeds which would be more than £750.

== Judgment ==
Lord Denning MR held that there was a sufficient common intention for severance at £750. The subsequent repudiation made no difference. He remarked Walton J was wrong on s 36(2) in Nielson-Jones v Feddon, and that severance also occurred through a course of dealings.

Even if there was not any firm agreement but only a course of dealing, it clearly evinced an intention by both parties that the property should henceforth be held in common and not jointly. ... They entered into negotiations that the property should be sold. Each received £200 out of the deposit paid by the purchaser. That was sufficient.

Browne LJ noted that simply because LPA 1925 section 40 is not fulfilled (now LPMPA 1989 section 2) did not mean an oral agreement would not bind because that section merely made it unenforceable, not void, in absence of writing. This was based on mutual agreement, not a course of dealings, but expressed no final opinion. Pennycuick LJ said that a course of dealings is a distinct head, not a subheading of mutual agreement.

The significance of an agreement is not that it binds the parties; but that it serves as an indication of a common intention to sever... ... the negotiations between Mr Honick and Mrs Rawnsley, if they can be properly described as negotiations at all, fall, it seems to me, far short of warranting an inference. One could not ascribe to joint tenants an intention to sever merely because one offers to buy out the other for £X and the other makes a counter-offer of £Y.

As the three judges found there was severance, at £750, this was the amount declared to be payable in law to the executrix of Rawnsley, less than the half of the sale proceeds she sought.

== See also ==
- English trusts law
- English land law
- English property law
