= King's English Society =

English charity

The King's English Society is a charity that aims to keep the English language safe from perceived declining standards. The Chairman is Peter Tompkins, a Chartered Actuary. Its Patrons are Gyles Brandreth, Simon Heffer and Quentin Letts.

The Society was known as the Queen's English Society during the reign of Elizabeth II.

== History ==
The Queen's English Society was founded in 1972 by Joe Clifton, an Oxford graduate and schoolteacher. The objectives of the Society, as expressed in its constitution, are "to promote the maintenance, knowledge, understanding, development and appreciation of the English language as used both colloquially and in literature; to educate the public in its correct and elegant usage; and to discourage the intrusion of anything detrimental to clarity or euphony."

Following the accession of King Charles III in 2022, the Society reconsidered its name. At the Annual General Meeting on 24 September 2024, the name was changed to The King's English Society.

== Publications ==
The Society's quarterly journal, Quest, has been sent to members from 1979. It includes articles, letters from members, news, book reviews, puzzles and poems. Books published by the QES include The Queen's English: And How to Use It by Bernard Lamb, and Shakin' the Ketchup Bot'le, a compilation of articles from Quest.

== See also ==
- Linguistic prescription
- Received Pronunciation
