= Harris v Goddard =

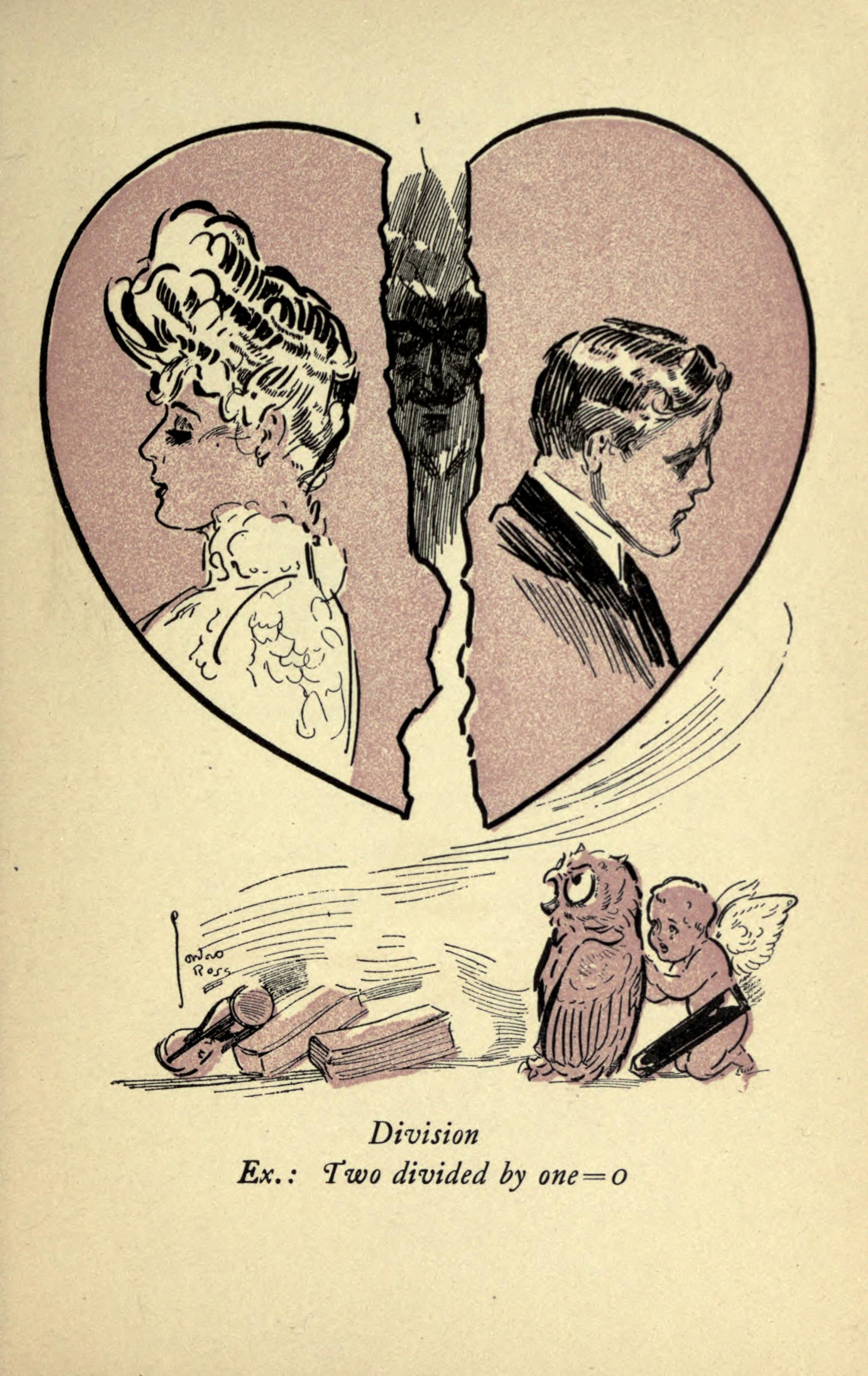
- Court: Court of Appeal
- Decided: 25 July 1983
- Citations: [1983] 3 All ER 242 [1983] 1 WLR 1203

Court membership
- Judges sitting: Lawton LJ; Dillon LJ; Kerr LJ

Keywords
- Co-ownership, severance, joint tenancy divorce petition

Harris v Goddard [1983] 3 All ER 242 is an English land law and matrimonial law case, concerning co-owned land between spouses and finding as to the effect of a divorce petition.

== Facts ==
Mr. Harris and Mrs. Harris, joint tenants, fell out, she petitioned for divorce and asked under the Matrimonial Causes Act 1973, "That such order may be made by way of transfer of property and/or settlement in respect of the former matrimonial home ... and otherwise as may be just". Mr Harris was killed in an accident, before the divorce hearing. The issue was whether a divorce petition effectively severs the joint tenancy. If so, she will have acted against her interests, as the property falls to be divided by the will (subject to the legal matrix of rights for dependant widows) (Note: See for example the Family Law Act 1996 and Inheritance (Provision for Family and Dependants) Act 1975.) as her husband quickly died.

== Judgment ==
Lawton LJ held that the petition was not effective to sever, because this was expressed to bring about the severance at some point in the future. His judgment continued.

It follows that a desire to sever must evince an intention to bring about the wanted result immediately ... Paragraph 3 of the prayer in the [divorce] petition does no more than invite the court to consider at some future time whether to exercise its jurisdiction under section 24 of the 1973 [matrimonial] Act, or, if it does, to do so in one or more of three different ways.

Dillon LJ said the following.

Severance is ... the process of separating off the share of a joint tenant, so that the concurrent ownership will continue but the right of survivorship will no longer apply. The parties will have separate shares as tenants in common ...

== Significance ==
The underlying law as to survivorship and the default way in which spouses co-own (as joint tenants in equity, not tenants in common in equity) has not changed – it takes documented 'words of severance' to end the survivor's full-parts ("absolute") inheritance of a jointly owned asset (which is the resultant feature of being a 'joint tenant in equity').

English family law common process in divorce (replicated at this stage in separation) has increased the likelihood of the reflection of the end of the relationship affecting the financial affairs of the parties. Under the Family Law Act 1996 a spouse or other cohabitant with shared children will commonly register their interests as part of any separation or divorce while also severing the joint tenancy. This means any third parties interested in the other spouse's property alone (for example) are fixed with actual notice of the rights of the spouse and that those rights are solidified. Equity itself has shifted in favour of equal division further than in 1983, with extra considerable sums likely for children.

== See also ==
- English trusts law
- English property law
