= Account of profits =

Type of equitable remedy in law

An account of profits (sometimes referred to as an accounting for profits or simply an accounting) is a type of equitable remedy most commonly used in cases of breach of fiduciary duty. It is an action taken against a defendant to recover the profits taken as a result of the breach of duty, in order to prevent unjust enrichment.

In conducting an account of profits, the plaintiff is treated as if they were conducting the business of the defendant, and made those profits which were attributable to the defendant's wrongful actions. This can be rather complex in practice, because the defendant's accounting records must be examined (sometimes by a forensic accountant) to determine what portion of his gross profits were derived to the wrongful act in question. As a result, mathematical exactness is not called for and reasonable approximation is acceptable.

Historically an account was not an equitable remedy, but was an action at common law, and is therefore technically an instrument of law, though it arose at a time before the distinction between law and equity was marked.

Co-owners in concurrent estates also have the right to an accounting of profits, in order to properly apportion income from the use or leasing of the property. The remedy is also available against strangers to a trust who "dishonestly assist" an express trustee in a breach of the trustee's fiduciary duty.

Case law has shown roughly two approaches to assessing the extent of an account of profits:

1. To account not of the entire business but of the particular benefits which flowed to him in breach of his duty;
2. To account for the entire business and its profits, due allowance being made for the time, energy, skill and financial contribution of the fiduciary (the approach in Boardman v Phipps).

== See also ==
- Tracing (law)
- Constructive trust
