= Bishopsgate Investment Management Ltd v Maxwell (No 2) =

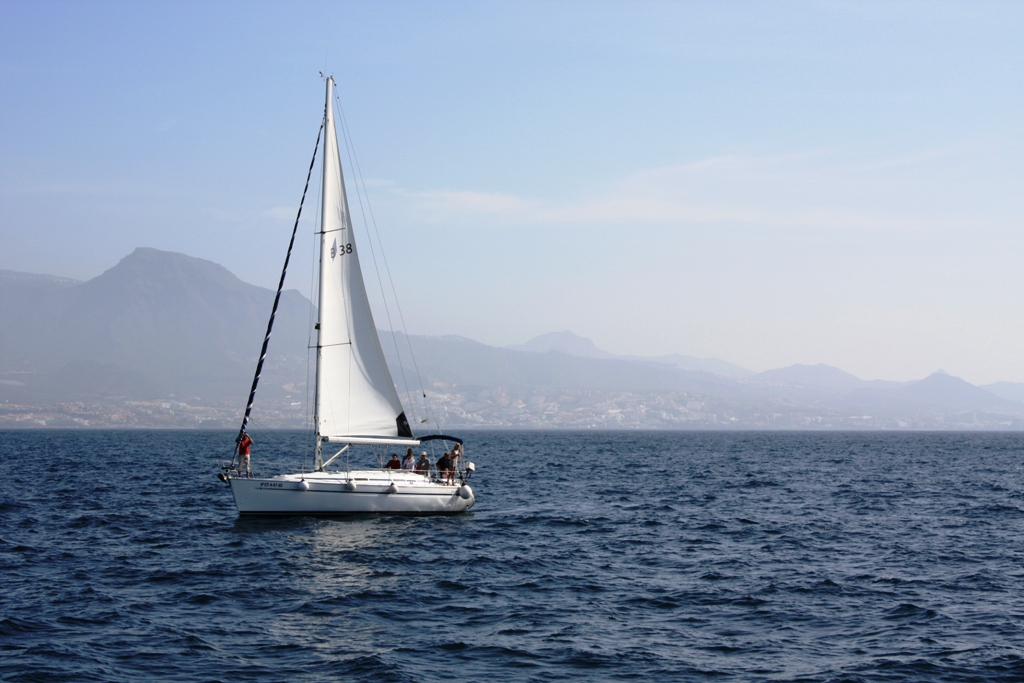
- Court: Court of Appeal
- Citation: [1993] BCLC 814

Court membership
- Judges sitting: Hoffmann LJ, Ralph Gibson LJ, Leggatt LJ

Keywords
- Fiduciary duty, proper purpose

Bishopsgate Investment Management Ltd v Maxwell (No 2) [1993] BCLC 814 is a UK company law case concerning a director's duty to act for proper purposes of the company. This case is an example of what would now be Companies Act 2006, section 171.

== Facts ==
Robert Maxwell, who controlled Maxwell Group plc and bought the Daily Mirror in 1984, fell off his yacht in the Canary Islands on 5 November 1991. It transpired he had used the company pension funds to fund his own lifestyle. Ian Maxwell was Robert’s son and a director of Bishopsgate Investment Management Ltd, which was meant to be safeguarding the company pension plans. He had signed share transfers from Bishopsgate to Maxwell Group plc for no consideration. The shares had been held on trust for a number of pension schemes. The liquidators of Bishopsgate sued Ian Maxwell to compensate for the value of the shares, on the basis that it was an improper use of the company's property.

== Judgment ==
Hoffmann LJ held that Ian Maxwell was liable for the value of the shares, not even on the basis of any negligence, but merely by misapplying the assets.

In the older cases the duty of a director to participate in the management of a company is stated in very undemanding terms. The law may be evolving in response to changes in public attitudes to corporate governance, as show by the enactment of the provisions consolidated in the CDDA 1986. Even so, the existence of a duty to participate must depend upon how the particular company’s business is organised and the part which the director could reasonably have been expected to play… Mr Ian Maxwell was in breach of his fiduciary duty because he gave away the company’s assets for no consideration… In the case of breach of the fiduciary duty, it seems to me that the cause of action is constituted not by failure to make inquiries but simply by the improper transfer of the shares… If a director chooses to participate in the management of the company and exercises powers on its behalf, he owes a duty to act bona fide in the interests of the company. He must exercise the power solely for the purpose for which it was conferred. To exercise the power for another purpose is a breach of his fiduciary duty. It is no answer that he was under no duty to act in the first place. Nor can Mr Maxwell be excused on the ground that he blindly followed the lead of his brother Kevin. If one signature was sufficient, the articles would have said so. The company was entitled to have two officers independently decide that it was proper to sign the transfer. Mr Maxwell was in breach of his fiduciary duty because he gave away the company's assets for no consideration to a private family company of which he was a director. This was prima facie a use of his powers as a director for an improper purpose and in my judgment the burden was upon him to demonstrate the propriety of the transaction.

Ralph Gibson LJ and Leggatt LJ concurred.

== See also ==
- Macmillan Inc v Bishopsgate Investment Trust plc (No 3) [1996] WLR 387
