= Ralph Gibson (judge) =

The Right Honourable Sir Ralph Gibson

Lord Justice of Appeal
- In office 1985–1994

Personal details
- Born: 17 October 1922
- Died: 30 October 2003 (aged 81)
- Education: Brasenose College, Oxford

Sir Ralph Brian Gibson (17 October 1922 – 30 October 2003) was a British barrister, Lord Justice of Appeal of the Court of Appeal of England and Wales, and Chairman of the Law Commission.

== Education and early years ==
Gibson was educated at Charterhouse School and graduated from Brasenose College, Oxford. His studies at Oxford were interrupted by World War II, during which he served in the 1st King's Dragoon Guards in North Africa as an armoured car driver and instructor, and the Transjordan Frontier Force.

At Oxford he became a close personal friend of Tony Benn. In 1949 he was best man at Benn's wedding.

After Oxford he spent a year at the University of Chicago as a teaching fellow, where he met and married Ann Ruether, a Chicago native who was part of the University faculty.

== Career ==
He was called to the Bar by the Middle Temple in 1948, and took silk in 1968.

He was appointed chairman of the Law Commission from 1981 to 1985, after stepping down from that role was appointed as a Lord Justice of Appeal for a period of nine years after that.

As a barrister, his obituary recorded that he was noted for his "rapid wit and rigorous research". He was also noted as "an open-minded and sympathetic judge". He reportedly once gave a robber a suspended sentence after being told that the defendant had donated a kidney to save his sister's life.

As a Law Commissioner one of his notable contributions to English law was the Law Commission's proposals which led to "clean break" divorces.
