= Tracing (law) =

Legal process

Tracing is a legal process, not a remedy, by which a claimant demonstrates what has happened to his/her property, identifies its proceeds and those persons who have handled or received them, and asks the court to award a proprietary remedy in respect of the property, or an asset substituted for the original property or its proceeds. Tracing allows transmission of legal claims from the original assets to either the proceeds of sale of the assets or new substituted assets.

Tracing ordinarily facilitates an equitable remedy, and is subject to the usual limitations and bars on equitable remedies in common law countries. In many common law countries, there are two concurrent processes, tracing at common law and tracing in equity. However, because the right to trace at common law is so circumscribed, the equitable process is almost universally relied upon, as equitable tracing can be performed into a mixed fund.

== Illustrations ==
"Tracing is thus neither a claim nor a remedy. It is merely a process by which a claimant demonstrates what has happened to his property, identifies its proceeds and the persons who have handled or received them, and justifies his claim that the proceeds can properly be regarded as representing his property." - Foskett v. McKeown

For example, if A has money in a solicitor’s account and the solicitor takes that money to buy a painting, then A may be able to make a claim against the painting. This claim will take priority even if the solicitor is bankrupt and has other unsecured claims against him.

Judicially, probably the most famous example of a tracing claim is Attorney‐General for Hong Kong v Reid [1994] 1 AC 324, [1994] 1 NZLR 1 (PC), where Mr Reid, then a crown prosecutor for Hong Kong, received bribes for passing information to organised crime in Hong Kong. Under Hong Kong law, the proceeds of those bribes were held on constructive trusts for the government of Hong Kong. Mr Reid then invested the proceeds of the bribes in land in New Zealand, and the land increased substantially in value. When he was caught, Mr Reid admitted that the money was subject to a constructive trust, but argued that he should only be liable to repay the amount of the bribes, and then any profit attributable to the increase in value of the land in New Zealand was not connected with his wrongdoing. However, the Judicial Committee of the Privy Council held that the government of Hong Kong's claim to the money could be traced into the land, and thus the claimant was entitled to the full value of the land, as without his wrong, Mr Reid would never have made those profits and it would be grossly inequitable for him to keep them.

== Advantages ==
Tracing claims have two key advantages to claimants.

- Firstly, they are a proprietary remedy (as opposed to a simple personal claim) which means that, if the defendant is insolvent, then the claimant can take title to the goods, rather than just receiving an award of damages which may be of little value against a defendant in bankruptcy. However, in some countries tracing may also lead to the award of a personal remedy where for some reason a proprietary remedy is not appropriate (i.e. it would upset pari passu distribution upon insolvency, where it would not be appropriate to do so).
- Secondly, as demonstrated in AG for Hong Kong v Reid, where the wrongdoer has made a profit, it allows the claimant to recover a greater amount than their original loss. The House of Lords applied the same reasoning in Foskett v McKeown [2001] AC 102 where the claimants sought to enforce their rights against a third party.

== Technical aspects ==
The law of tracing is enormously complex, even to practitioners. Characteristically, tracing claims tend to involve fraud, and as a result most claims (and case law) are against the background of a complex factual matrix. However, the law itself is also complex, and a number of key aspects of the law remain ambiguous in many countries.

- Equitable tracing requires a fiduciary relationship, while common law tracing does not. However, this relationship does not need to have existed before the misappropriation took place. However, this difference between common law and equity has been criticized by Lord Millett and Lord Steyn in Foskett v McKeown, though they stopped short of deciding that the traditional precondition to equitable tracing should be overruled.
- The wrongdoer may mix the misappropriated funds with his own money, and then purchase an asset with the mixed fund.
- Complexity arises where there are multiple innocent claimants.
- Complexity arises where there is mixing of the funds by an innocent volunteer.
- Application of tracing as a remedy for unjust enrichment also engenders complexity.

== Defences ==
In most jurisdictions, there are several reasonably well establishing defences to tracing claims, although the case law is not entirely consistent. The common defences to an equitable tracing claim are:

1. good faith purchaser for value and without notice
2. dissipation
3. discharge of a debt (such that the proceeds are no longer traceable and there is no substitute asset)
4. innocent change of position (usually, but not always, by an innocent third party)

Importantly, in each case it is only the process of tracing that is lost. The claimant may well still enjoy a personal claim against the wrongdoer, even though they may have lost their proprietary right to trace into substituted assets.

== Remedies ==
In common law countries there are a variety of remedies that can be imposed when the court is satisfied that an equitable tracing claim has been made. The principal remedies are:

1. an election to take the property (or a resulting trust)
2. an equitable charge over the property
3. an account of profits, secured by an equitable lien
4. a constructive trust

== See also ==
- Macmillan Inc v Bishopsgate Investment Trust plc (No 3)
- Taylor v Plumer [1815] 3 M & S 562
- Tracing in English law
