= Conciliation committee (works council) =

Mediation board for works council and employer

A conciliation committee (German: Einigungsstelle) is a formal arbitration mechanism defined in German labour law for mediating certain conflicts internally between a group, central or local works council and the employer. The Works Constitution Act defines the conciliation committee in sections §76–76a.

When a works council and an employer have a difference of opinion or a legal dispute, there are two ways to escalate the dispute. The first is through the various labour courts. The second way is through the conciliation committee, which is not open to the public.

If the employer and works council cannot agree on enforceable co-determination issues, the conciliation committee can award a legally binding works agreement in accordance with section §87(2) of the Works Constitution Act. It can also make binding decisions about the works council itself, individual employee claims and the information rights of the works council finance committee.

== Structure ==
The conciliation committee comprises an independent chairperson, usually a (former) labour judge and an equal number of assessors chosen by each the employer and the works council, often two or three people. In more complex cases, a larger number is justified. If the employer and works council are unable to agree on a chairperson, a labour court will appoint one instead.

If either the works council or the employer disagrees with the decision of the conciliation committee, they can apply for a legal review by a labour court on the grounds that the conciliation committee exceeded its discretionary power.

== Scope ==
The outcome of a conciliation committee is typically a binding award. For matters of enforceable co-determination, the award is a replacement works agreement. For mass layoffs negotiations, a social plan.

The committee can make decisions regarding the works council itself, such as the size of the group and central works councils, individual works council member releases from work, and the time and place of works council consultation hours.

The conciliation committee can resolve individual matters including employee complaints about the handling of workplace harassment claims and holiday planning. It can also be used in other cases by mutual agreement between the employer and the works council.

Many of the works council's information rights are enforced by labour courts, with the exception of finance committee's information rights, which is enforced by the conciliation committee due to the practical sensitivities around business secrets under §109.

== In practice ==
2,000 works councils were interviewed in a 2017 survey by the Economic and Social Research Institute (WSI) of the Hans Boeckler Foundation. Around 15 percent of works councils with at least one works agreement had a works agreement that was awarded by a conciliation committee. In larger works councils, this probability rises to 25 percent.

== External ==
- § 76 of the Works Constitution Act (official text)
- Hans Boeckler Foundation – Conciliation Committee (in German)
