= Finance committee (works council) =

The finance committee or economic committee (German: Wirtschaftsausschuss) is an advisory body of the works council that analyses the financial and operational activities in a company. It enables the works council to carry out its duties in a German establishment and/or legal entity. The finance committee has strong information rights and limited consultation rights.

== History ==
The finance committee was first introduced in section §68 of the 1952 Works Constitution Act in West Germany. The committee consisted of 4–8 members, with an equal number of members representing each capital and labour (employer and employee interests). Initially, trade unions proposed a finance committee with full co-determination rights, or equal decision making power on financial matters, but the employer reduced the scope of the committee to primarily receiving information and limited consultation.

The finance committee's lack of financial codetermination is part of a larger historical debate around codetermination. After threats of massive strikes by IG Metall, the Montan-Mitbestimmungsgesetz was passed in 1951 in West Germany. It applied to workplaces with over 1,000 employees in the coal and steel industries, which impacted 105 companies at the time. It granted codetermination, or equal representation on the supervisory board of directors for workers and employers including a neutral chair chair chosen by both parties.

A year later, section 76 of the 1952 Works Constitution Act provided weaker supervisory board codetermination for workers in all other industries that had at least 500 employees or were not otherwise covered by the Montan-Mitbestimmungsgesetz. It reserved 1/3 of supervisory board seats for employee interests.

The 1976 Codetermination Act applied to all corporations with more than 2,000 employees, affording equal number of seats to employee and capital interests, but with the chair appointed by the employer. In 2004, the Drittelbeteiligungsgesetz replaced remaining sections in the 1952 Works Constitution Act. The Drittelbeteiligungsgesetz continued to reserve 1/3 supervisory board seats for employee representatives. It applied to workplaces between 500–999 employees who are not already covered under the (Montan-)Mitbestimmungsgesetz and all other workplaces with 500–1999 employees not covered by the broader Mitbestimmungsgesetz (Codetermination Act).

== Legality ==
The finance committee's duties is presently defined in §§106–113 of the 1972 Works Constitution Act. If a works council exists and represents more than 100 permanent employees, they must establish a finance committee, or else it is a breach of their works council duty. Works councils in smaller workplaces can also enforce its economic information rights under BetrVG §80(2), however the works council must then show the necessity of such information.

If there is a central works council, the finance committee becomes the responsibility of the central works council. There is no corresponding responsibility for the group works council.

According to BetrVG §118, if a company is primarily religious, charitable, educational, political or artistic in nature e.g German Red Cross or Max Planck Institute, then the finance committee is largely limited to financial and operational planning during restructurings, including mass-layoffs as defined in BetrVG §§111–113.

The finance committee is different from other "committees" of the works council within the meaning of BetrVG §28. The finance committee uniquely can appoint non works council members. It has a semi-autonomous role in discussing and negotiating with the employer, for example selecting external experts (to advise the finance committee on topics that exceed internal knowledge). In contrast, other works council committees consist exclusively of works council members.

== Activity ==
The finance committee must meet with a representative of management on a monthly basis per BetrVG §108.

The company must also inform the finance committee about its financial activities. 10 areas of financial reporting are explicitly outlined in BetrVG §106(3) and BetrVG §108(5) including potential acquisitions, employee layoffs, expansions/downsizing, profit and loss reporting. This list is not exhaustive, and other topics that are of financial or operational interest to the works council are included as well.

If the finance committee is not given adequate information, accessible documentation in good-time by management, the (central) works council can call in a conciliation committee to mediate between the employer and finance committee, and if necessary, make a binding award on how and what financial information is furnished.

== Composition ==
The finance committee should have between three and seven members (all employees), including at least one (central) works council member. Regular employees as well as executive management employees (normally excluded from works council scope) are eligible to be on the finance committee. The finance committee members serve the same term as the (central) works council, however they can be replaced at anytime by a majority vote of the (central) works council.

The works council however, can delegate specific tasks of the finance committee to other internal works council committees, which has advantage of being up to 22 members instead of 7 in larger works councils. German legislators had a practical concern that if a committee becomes too large, the employer might be more reluctant to share financial information in full.

Like the works council, members of the finance committee serve on an honorary basis, without loss of wages from their regular work. This includes preparatory meetings outside of mandatory monthly meetings with the employer.
