= Volkswagen and unions =

Collective worker action at the German auto firm Volkswagen

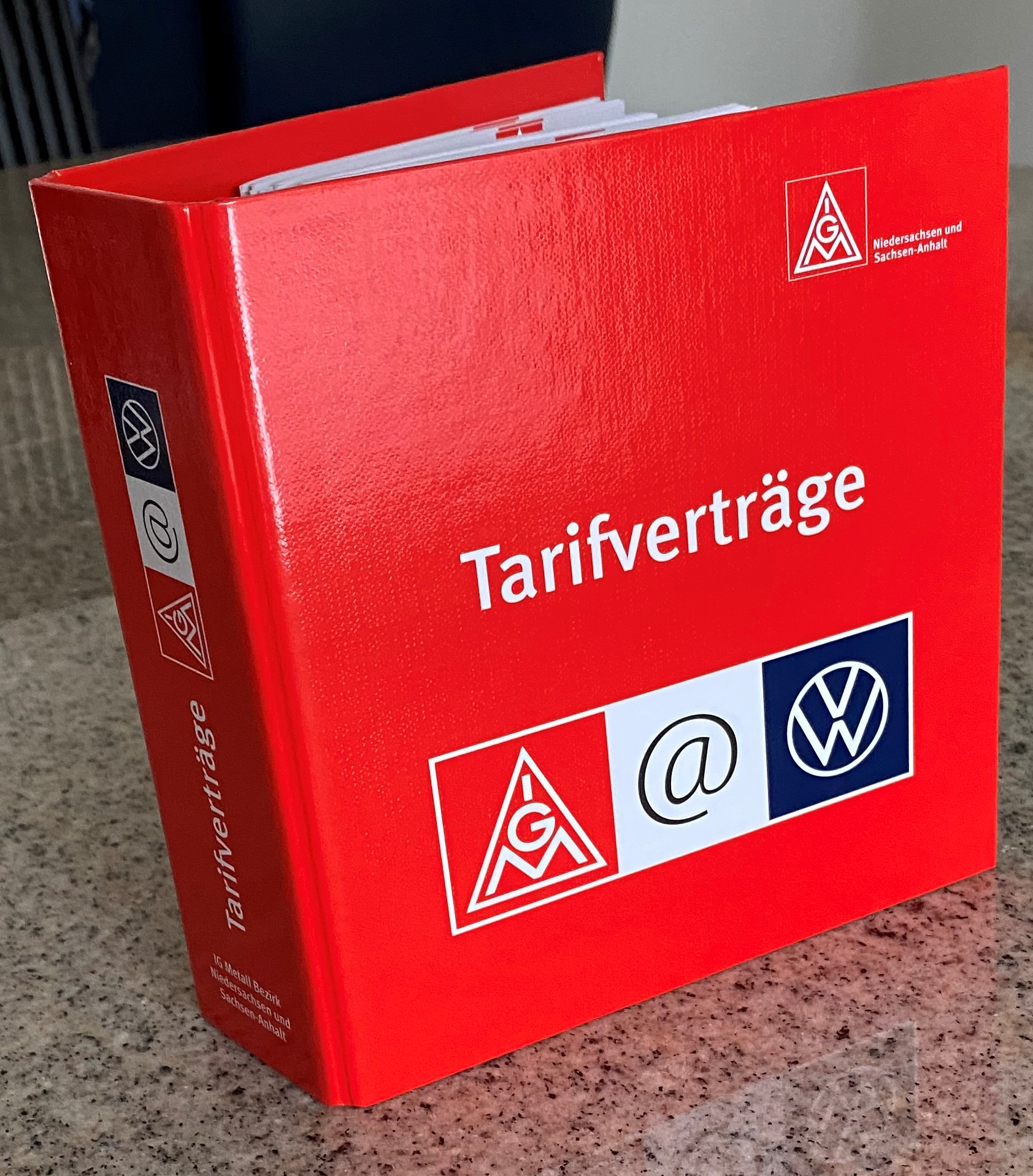
A red binder containing the collective agreement texts of the Volkswagen collective agreements between Volkswagen and IG Metall

Workers of the German auto manufacturer Volkswagen Group are collectively organized and represented by unions and Works Councils across the globe. Workers are organized on multiple levels; locally, regionally, nationally, internationally and by marque.

Within Germany, the role of the union IG Metall and Works Councils at Volkswagen is unique, even compared with other large auto firms.

Volkswagen workers have some of the strongest organized labour power at any company in the world. These powers are codified in different collective agreements internationally. In Germany collective agreements cover 120,000 workers, almost the entire workforce.

Workers at all of its major locations are represented in the Global Works Council and local union bodies. VW Group has a tradition and practice of social partnership and co-determination rights between management and workers beyond the regulated standards.

== Transnational activity ==
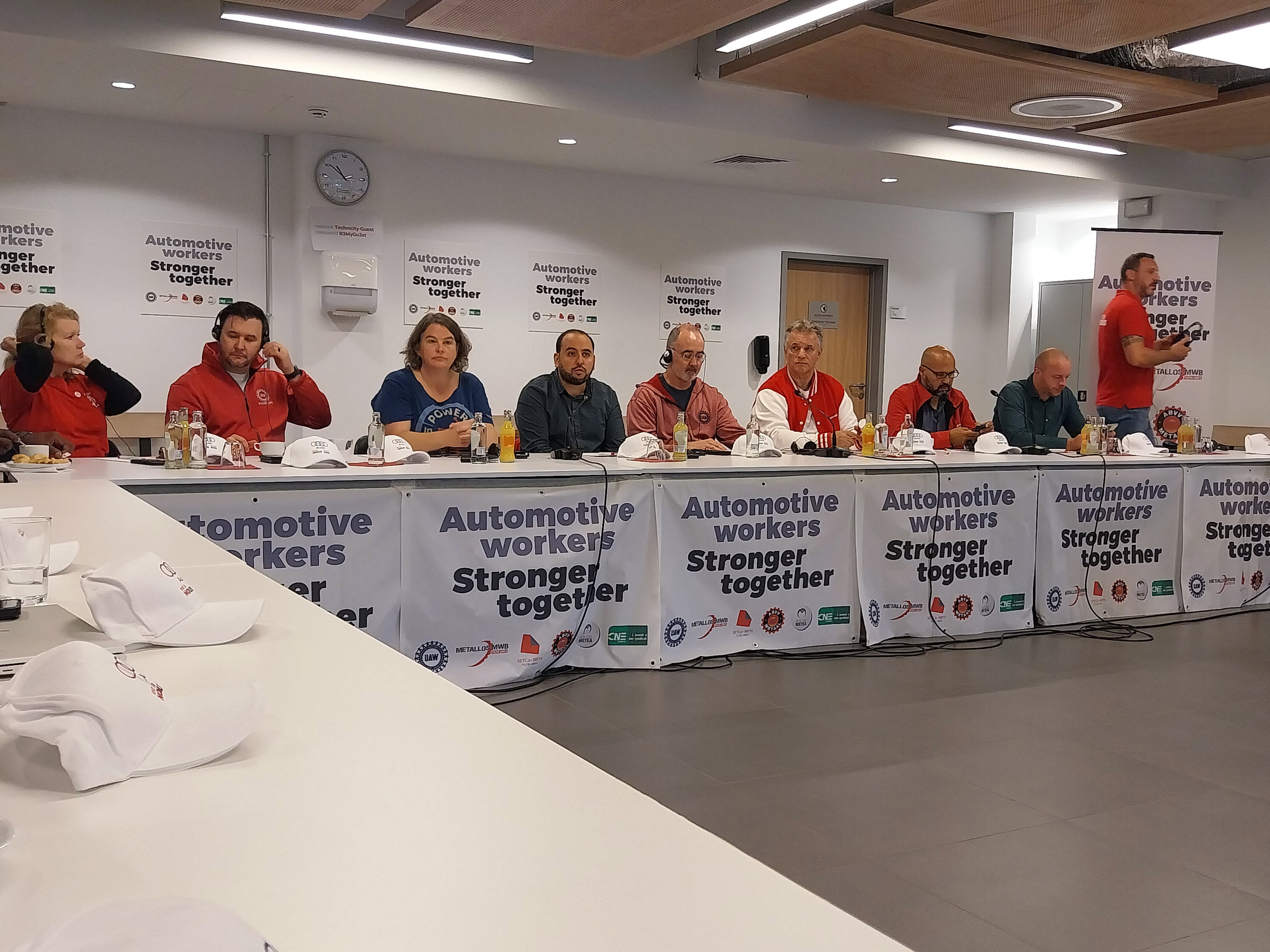
Trade union leaders from UAW, IndustriALL and Belgian unions CMB (ABVV-FGTB), Metea (ACV-CSC) hold a press conference against the proposed closure of Audi Brussels in September 2024.

VW Group operates 120 plants in 29 countries as of November 2021. VW Group opened its first foreign plant in Brazil in 1953. Transnational labour organizing started in the 1970s with German workers and workers at its foreign locations which were Belgium, Brazil, Mexico and South Africa. The German Works Councils were particularly concerned with the political developments in Apartheid South Africa and the military dictatorship in Brazil. While most of the Volkswagen and unions operate on a respective national level, several transnational structures like the VW Global and European Works Councils and the InterSoli groups bridge these connections.

A general tension exists between the interests of the workers in the headquarter state (Germany) and foreign states, but workers in foreign states also gain strategic benefits from having closer access to a well resourced union (IG Metall) and the German Works Councils with their direct access to central management.

From a managerial point of view, countries with limited employee representation and therefore lower labour costs have a 'competitive advantage over countries with strong representation (i.e. Germany). For German VW workers, expanding German "best practices" globally neutralizes that threat by leveling the playing field.

=== International Solidarity working group ===
The International Solidarity (InterSoli) working group of IG Metall Wolfsburg (German: Arbeitskreis Internationale Solidarität der IG Metall Wolfsburg) launched in 1982, with separate working groups focused on Brazil, Mexico and South Africa. In February 1999, InterSoli launched the China working group. Three years later the Central and Eastern Europe working group was established in February 2002.

The VW World Group Committee was established in 1979 by the International Metalworkers' Federation. (Note: International Metalworkers' Federation later merged into the IndustriALL Global Union.) It met irregularly, with follow up meetings in 1986 and 1993 to exchange each other's experiences.

InterSoli, in addition to the VW World Group Committee facilitates global contact between German union members and workers in foreign operations.

=== European Works Council ===
With the acquisition of SEAT in 1986, VW Group had operations in 3 European states: Germany, Belgium and Spain. The German Group Works Council and foreign members of VW Group initiated the formation of a European Works Council. The first meeting was in 1990, with a signed agreement in 1992; a full two years prior to the EU ratification of the European Works Council Directive (94/45/EC).

As of 2017, the Volkswagen European Works Council has 70 employee representatives.

=== Global Works Council ===
The Volkswagen Group Global Works Council (GWC) also known as the Volkswagen Group World Works Council, was established in 1998. It was the first Global Works Council of its kind anywhere in the world. The first chair of the GWC was Klaus Volkert, also chair of the VW European–, Group– and General Works Council. The preamble and provisions of the GWC were copied nearly verbatim from the VW European Works Council agreements, albeit with a different formula accounting for the additional non–European countries. Initially it consisted of 27 employee representatives, 20 from Europe and 7 from other parts of the world. It has grown as of 2017 to 100 employee representatives.

VW Global Works Council members in 1999
Country	Number of members	By marque
Germany	11	8 Volkswagen, 2 Audi, 1 VW Sachsen
Spain	3	2 SEAT, 1 VW Navarra
Belgium	1	1 VW Brussels
Czechia	1	1 Škoda
Slovakia	1	1 VW Škoda
Poland	1	1 VW Poznan
United Kingdom	1	1 Rolls-Royce/Bentley
Portugal	1	1 AutoEuropa
Mexico	1	1 VW Mexico
Brazil	4	4 VW Brasil
Argentina	1	1 VW Argentina
South Africa	1	1 VW South Africa

=== Global Framework Agreements ===
In 2002, management from VW Group together with employee representatives from the Global and European Works Councils signed the "Declaration on Social Rights and Industrial Relationships at Volkswagen" a Global Framework Agreement (GFA) with the International Metalworkers' Federation.

In 2012, VW Group and the IndustriALL Global Union signed the Global Framework Agreement "Charter on Temporary Work for the Volkswagen Group", specifying the terms and conditions of agency workers at VW Group and its subsidiaries. However, VW Group formally limits the scope of the GFA to countries represented in the Global Works Council, which China is not a member of. In subsequent years, Chinese temporary workers at FAW-Volkswagen posted on social media, bylaws from the "Charter on Temporary Work" as evidence of VW Group's commitment to its temporary workforce.

In 2019, IndustriALL suspended its agreement with VW Group over its refusal to bargain with the United Auto Workers in the United States.

== Germany ==
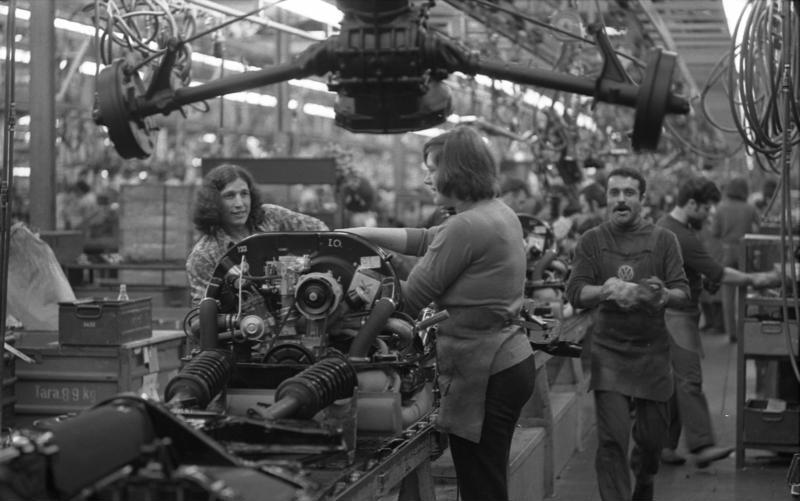
Workers in the Wolfsburg Volkswagen Plant in 1973

Volkswagen Group is organized on multiple levels, locally, regionally, nationally, internationally and by marque. The heart of its labour representation is in Wolfsburg, Germany. Its headquarter plant alone has over 65,000 employees or half of the total German workforce.

=== 1937–1945: Nazi origins ===
Volkswagenwerk GmbH (Volkswagen Factory GmbH) was established in Wolfsburg, Germany in 1937 by the German Labour Front, a Nazi organization. It is estimated by historians that 60–70% of the workforce were enslaved or forced labour including from Arbeitsdorf, a concentration camp specifically built for providing VW with enslaved labour. Workers were subject to racialized hierarchies when it came to housing, nutrition and treatment, with Soviet prisoners of war, Poles and "Eastern Workers" on the bottom of the hierarchy.

=== 1945–1949: British occupying power ===
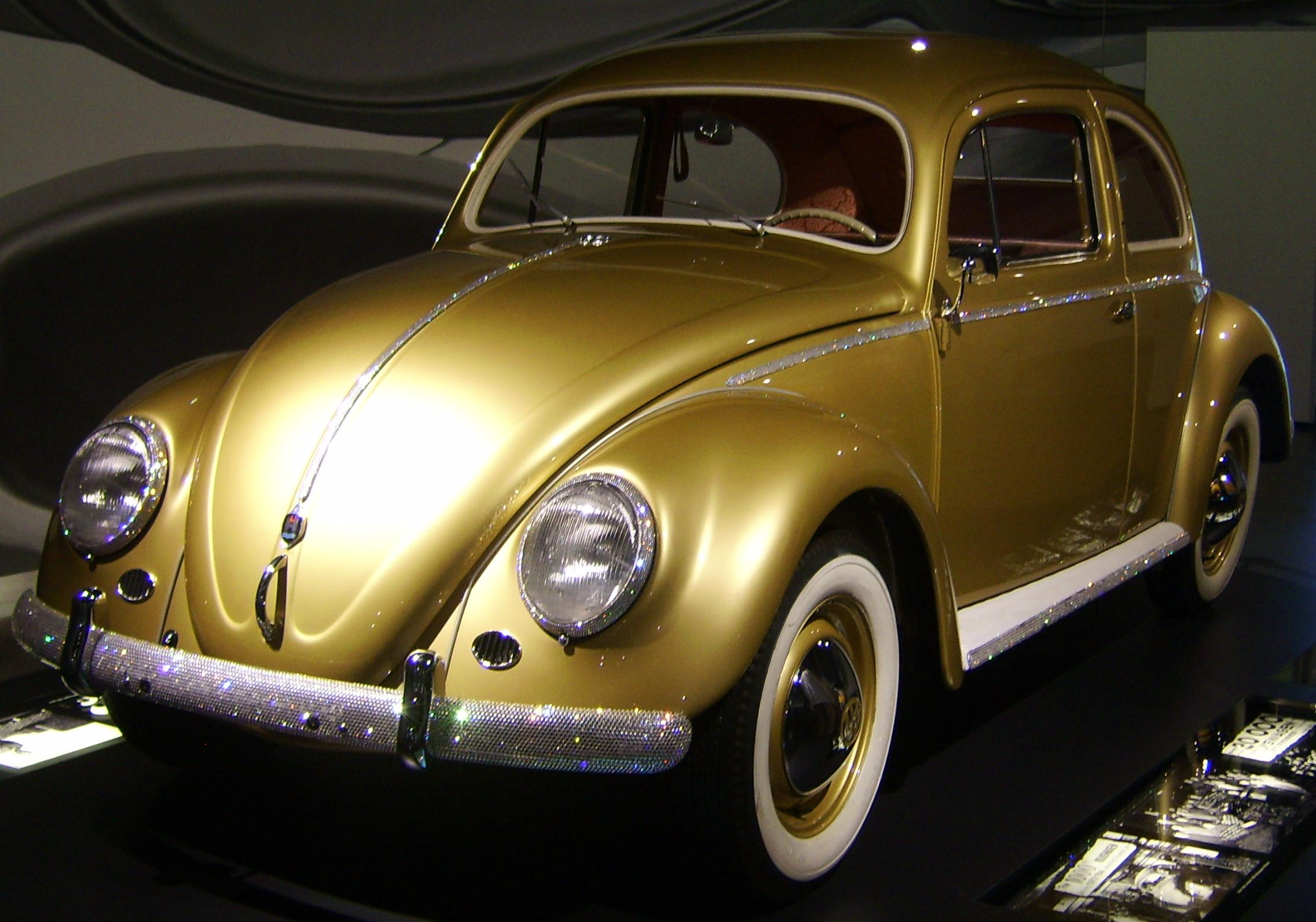
The Volkswagen Beetle was an icon of post-war West Germany's "economic miracle".

In July 1945, with pressure from Social Democrats and Communists, a provisional Works Council (German: Betriebsvertretung, lit. 'Factory representation') was authorized by the British occupying power. It was expressly forbidden for the Works Council to discuss politics or practice co-determination. However, it had informational and discussion rights. By November 1945, the first democratically elected Works Council was voted in.

Given Volkswagen's origins and the political climate after the end of World War II, British Major Ivan Hirst was tasked with the denazification of Volkswagen in the autumn of 1945; which initially applied solely to VW management on a limited scale. In January 1946, Hirst declared the denazification process as complete, to the dismay of the Works Council and the General Union. (Note: The Deutscher Gewerkschaftsbund of which IG Metall is part of, was not founded until 1949.) 228 mid to lower–level managers were selected for dismissal due to their alleged Nazi associations in June 1946. One year later, the Works Council still had very limited co-determination rights, particularly when it came to reinstating dismissed Nazi sympathizers. In 1947, the provisions of the Control Council Act No 22 were applied to VW, which notably included co-determination rights over hiring, firing and transfer of employees.

In addition to the infighting between the Social Democrats (SPD) and the Communists (KPD), far-right wing union opposition candidates from the German Right Party (DRP; Deutsche Rechtspartei) ran for the first time in 1948. In the following 1949 Works Council elections, due to the political climate (DRP won 70% of the Wolfsburg city council election in 1948) and a workforce composed of Wehrmacht officers, freed soldiers and German refugees from the East; the two leading unions IG Metall and German Salaried Employees' Union reserved 6 spots in their Works Council election lists for right-wing candidates as a strategy of neutralizing the opposition.

The transfer of Volkswagen by the British authorities to the governments of Lower Saxony and the newly formed West German government in 1949, completed its transfer of ownership to Germany. IG Metall became the dominant union force in VW one year later, coinciding with the German period of ""economic miracles".

=== Supervisory board ===
In the VW Group's supervisory board, IG Metall and the VW Group Works Council can appoint 10 employee representative seats, with the other ten seats filled by the employer. Within the 10 employee representative seats, seven are reserved for VW Group employees, including one managerial-employee, and the remaining three are reserved for union representatives, i.e. IG Metall, including its president Jörg Hofmann. Typically the chair of the supervisory board from the employer side has two votes, tipping the supervisory board towards the employer side. However, in the case of VW on the employer side, Lower Saxony state holds two seats, which are currently filled by politicians Stephan Weil and Bernd Althusmann. When Social Democrat politicians fill the employer seats, it contributes to a labour friendly supervisory board.

=== Collective agreements ===
A provision in the 1960 Volkswagen Act that privatized Volkswagenwerk GmbH into Volkswagen Group (AG; Aktiengesellschaft), stipulates 80% of shareholders are needed to pass any major decisions. Lower Saxony state has a voting share of 20.2%, ensuring a veto power on any major decisions. Due to this veto power, the German Employers' Association precludes VW Group from membership or concluding sectoral agreements within any regional branches of the Employers' Associations in the Metal and Electrical Engineering Industries (Gesamtmetall). Unlike its automotive competitors BMW or Daimler who have regional agreements, this means lG Metall negotiates directly with Volkswagen Group, instead of an employer association.

The Volkswagen in-house collective agreements are some of the strongest collective agreements in Germany. The 2021 collective agreement applies to 120,000 VW workers in the following six plants: Wolfsburg, Braunschweig, Hanover, Salzgitter, Emden and Kassel as well as Volkswagen Financial Services.

=== Works Councils and IG Metall ===
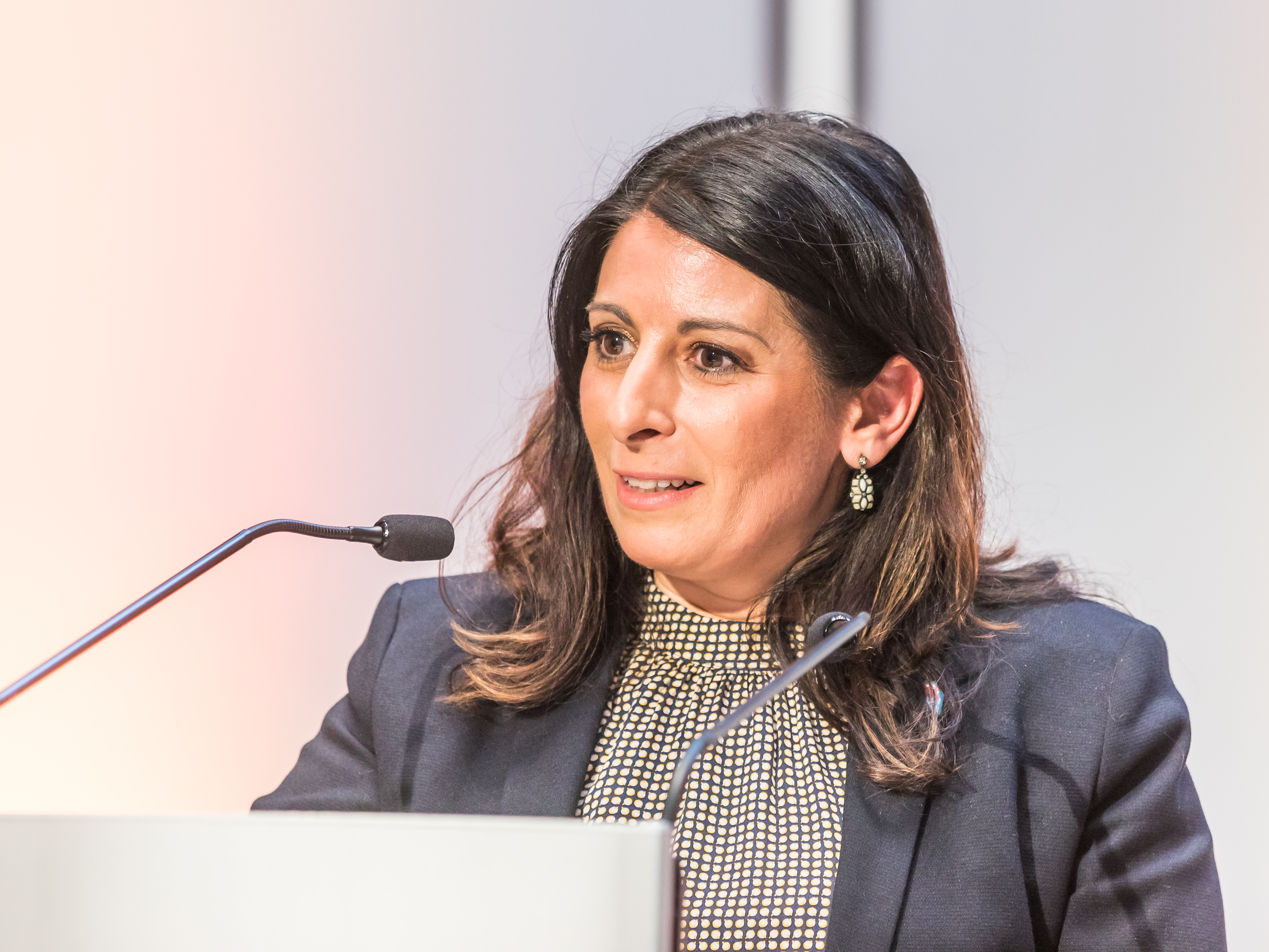
Works Council Chair Daniela Cavallo

The chair of the Global–, European–, Group–, General and local Wolfsburg Works Council is Daniela Cavallo. She was elected in the Wolfsburg Works Council election in March 2022, the headquarter plant. The IG Metall list won 66 out of 73 Works Council seats. Cavallo first served as the chair in May 2021, when she was appointed to succeed Bernd Osterloh. She is the first woman chair at VW Group and is arguably the most powerful employee representative in all of Germany.

During the 2018 Wolfsburg Works Council election, 86% of employees voted for the IG Metall list or 66 out of 75 Works Council seats, with only two other lists competing. A network of 2,500 rank-and-file IG Metall union representatives organized internally by the "Union Representative Steering Committee of VW" (German: Vertrauenskörperleitung bei VW) ensure the IG Metall backed Works Council has extensive influence and reach in the workplace. Additionally, VW Group pays for 70 administrative personnel to assist the Works Councils in performing their duties.

== Brazil ==
Volkswagen do Brasil (VW Brasil) was established on 23 March 1953 to re-assemble Beetle cars in a growing market. It was Brazil's first German automobile plant, and VW's first foreign factory. In the 1960s, VW Brasil was VW Group's largest foreign member and Brazil's 5th largest industrial firm. From 1960 to the 1970s, its workforce increased from 7,000 employees to over 40,000. Union activity in VW Brasil was heavily repressed until the 1980s. In a 2014 National Truth Commission, the extent to which VW Brasil management collaborated with the Brazilian military dictatorship was revealed. VW Group commissioned a year long study in 2016 by historian Christopher Kopper, to uncover the extent to which VW Group participated and collaborated in repression of its employees. In 2020, VW Group agreed to pay 5.5 million euros, part of which will go the Heinrich Plagge victims' association, and the rest going towards various research and human rights projects.

=== 1964 coup ===
While VW Brasil was not directly involved with the 1964 military overthrow of the Brazilian government, as a significant financial contributor to the Industrial Association of São Paulo (FIESP) which wielded political influence and was in favour of regime change, VW Brasil CEO Friedrich Schultz-Wenk was most likely in favour as well. Wenk not only justified the violence and repression against communists (PCB) and union leaders, but in a letter to VW Group CEO Heinrich Nordhoff, Wenk stated "What is currently taking place is a hunt such as we did not even see back in 1933 in Germany", a nod to the Nazi rise to power in Germany, which was stated in awe and respect rather than horror. Nordhoff did not share the same enthusiasm, not because of concern for human rights, but because of the negative impact the political instability might have on VW Brasil. Lower Saxony state had 50% ownership of VW Group but did not interfere with VW Brasil throughout. Management at VW Group and VW Brasil both benefited from and saw the military dictatorship in a positive light.

Labour laws established during the Vargas dictatorship (1937–1945) were already weak and they remained in place during the democratic phase (1946–1964); for example, collective agreements could only be approved by the Ministry of Labour and the establishment of a federal metal workers' union was forbidden, in favour of regional federations. Labour laws were further weakened in June 1964, with the "Strike Act" (Lei de Greve) which criminalized striking with prison sentences of 6–12 months for strike leaders.

Since 1969 there was collaboration between VW Brasil's internal Works Security department (Portuguese: Departamento de Segurança Industria) and the Brazilian political police (DEOPS; Brazilian Portuguese: Departamento Estadual de Ordem Política e Social). It was headed by Brazilian Army officer major Ademar Rudge. Their collaboration lead to the arrests and torture of at least 12 employees of VW Brasil including Communist Party of Brazil member Lúcio Bellentani who described his arrest to the Brazil National Truth Commission, with numerous more being blacklisted. By 1973, for every 79 VW Brasil employees, there was one member of the Works Security department, enabling a deeply surveilled workplace.

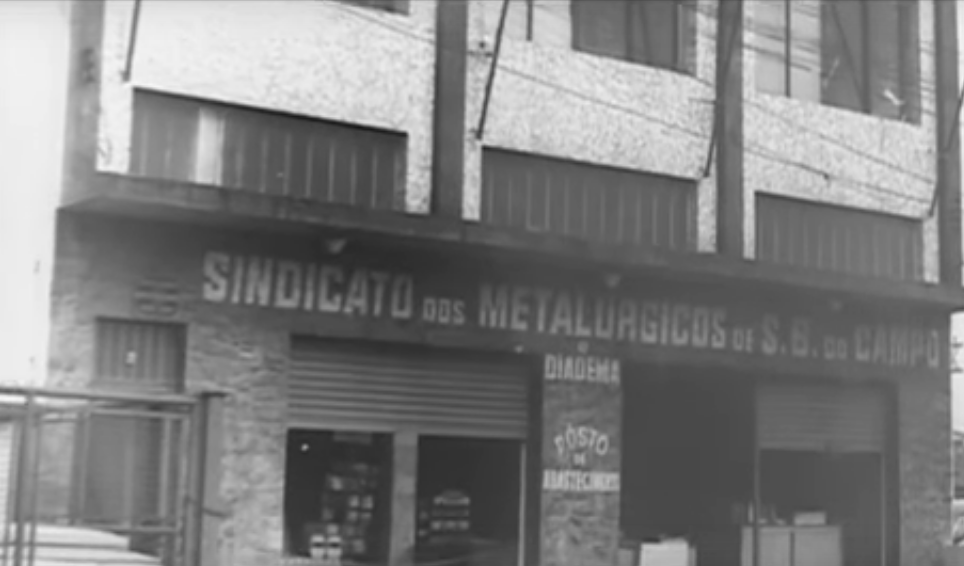
Office of São Bernardo do Campo metalworkers union building

It was only in 1975, that the General Works Council of Volkswagen Group began to investigate the working conditions in Brazil. A 1976 delegation including the Works Council chair Siegfried Ehlers, met with the local affiliate of the São Bernardo do Campo metalworkers union, facilitated by the International Metalworkers Federation. After hearing serious allegation of wage dispersion, surveillance of workers and ban on union assemblies, the delegation asked to meet with the VW Brasil union representatives directly. To the delegation's surprise, the representatives denied the allegations made by the local metalworkers union. There were no legitimate employee representatives from and up to 1977; the few existing union representatives were pelegos more closely associated with the company than the workers. Before 1980, the only legitimate contacts available to the German Works Council was the local São Bernardo do Campo union committee. Additionally they had communication channels through the International Metalworkers Federation and the International Relations department of the IG Metall.

By 1979, due to pressure from the German media and the employee representatives on Volkswagen Group's supervisory board, VW Group was forced to change from being a passive beneficiary of the military dictatorship to an agent of change. In October 1980, VW Brasil became the first major company in Brazil to have employee representation (a Works Council) even though it was not required by law.

== Czechia ==
Škoda Auto a.s. employs 37,000 employees in Czechia across 3 plants in Mladá Boleslav, Kvasiny and Vrchlabí. Employees of Škoda are unionized in the Metal Workers union (Czech: Odborový svaz KOVO; OS KOVO) affiliated to the CMKOS. The Mladá Boleslav regional affiliate of the union (KOVO MB) is chaired by Jaroslav Povšík. Povšík is also on the Supervisory Board of Škoda.

== China ==
Volkswagen Group China has operated since 1984 in China, with the establishment of joint venture SAIC Volkswagen followed by FAW-Volkswagen in 1991 and JAC in 2017. Independent unions in China are banned, with the All-China Federation of Trade Unions (ACFTU) being the only permitted one. 80% of VW China's 23,000 employees are unionized, and include a Works Council structure.

In February 1999, InterSoli launched the China working group, in part to address the numerous human rights issues in China and limited union democracy. In 2010 for the first time, China was present in the Global Works Council meeting. (Note: A report in 2017 lists China as an example of a country without any seats in the Global Works Council.)

=== FAW-VW labour dispute ===
In 2016, Chinese legislation regarding temporary work expired. Temporary workers of the Changchun FAW-Volkswagen (FAW-VW) plant sought collective bargaining with ACFTU, FAW-VW and temporary agencies to represent 3,000 agency workers. Workers argued their working conditions not only breached Chinese labour law, but also Volkswagen's Global Framework Agreement "Charter on Temporary Work".

Temporary worker demands included equal pay between them and regular employees of FAW-VW, a conversion of temporary contracts into permanent ones, and limiting the reliance on temporary workers. After several unsuccessful rounds of bargaining and an unsuccessful court petition, hundreds of workers organized a protest in the front of the factory gate in February 2017 under the slogan "equal pay for equal work".

Following another demo organized on 21 May, three worker representatives, Fu Tianbo, Wang Shuai, and Ai Zhenyu were detained by police on 26 May. Shuai and Zhenyu were released, while Tianbo remained in custody on the accusation of "disturbing public order". A Volkswagen spokesperson told Frankfurter Rundschau, due to the criminal charges, there was nothing further they could do for Tianbo. In contrast, Han Dongfang, a labour activist and founder of China Labour Bulletin told Frankfurter Rundschau newspaper that VW Group, IG Metall and VW Works Councils could do more to support Tianbo, like visiting Tianbo in jail. In November 2018, Tianbo was found guilty but exempted from further punishment.

== Mexico ==
Volkswagen Mexico employs 13,000 workers at its plant in Puebla, Mexico. Since 1972, the workforce at VW has been organized locally under the banner of the Independent Union of Volkswagen (SITIAVW; Spanish: Sindicato Independiente de Trabajadores Volkswagen).

In 1962, Volkswagen initiated operations in Xalostoc through the legal entity PROMEXA (Planta Promotora Mexicana de Automóviles). Two years later, the workers established their first union, which affiliated to the General Confederation of Workers (CGT; Confederación General de Trabajadores). When VW Mexico transferred its operations to Puebla in 1966, the union transferred from CGT to the undemocratic Confederation of Mexican Workers (CTM; Confederación de Trabajadores de México) which was closely linked with the ruling party, the PRI.

An embezzlement scandal worth over 1,000,000 Mexican pesos, taken from member union dues, incriminated the CTM. This event compelled union members to switch their affiliation to the Independent Workers' Union (UOI; Unidad Obrera Independiente). From 1974 to 1978, workers initiated four strike campaigns that led to increased wages. They however failed to address impact of flexible automation, job losses. This was in part because of the concentrated power union leadership had over its members in decision making.By the late 1970s UOI had ceased to be independent and adopted PRI guidelines.

An internal struggle over the union leadership in November 1981, reached a critical juncture, leading to a mass strike rally, that drew a significant turnout of 10,000 workers and their family members. The rally criticized the authoritarian practices of UOI and threatened sustained strike action. The Mexican Ministry of Labour conducted a union vote, which was 1,230 in favour of the UOI leadership and 6,400 in favour of the reform group.

SITIAVW disaffiliated and remained an independent single-plant union, until 1997 when it co-founded UNT (Unión Nacional de Trabajadores), a progressive union federation. In 2018, SITIAVW formed a new industrial union federation for all automotive, rubber and aerospace unions.

== Slovakia ==
Volkswagen Slovakia employs 9,000 employees at its Bratislava and Martin plants. Since 2016, 75% of its workers are unionized members of Modern Volkswagen Union (MOV; Slovak: Moderné odbory Volkswagen), which formed after a contentious split from the Volkswagen branch of Metal Workers Union (Slovak: OZ Kovo), affiliated with the KOZ SR.

On 20 June 2017, an estimated 70% of the workforce across three facilities participated in the first strike ever at Volkswagen Slovakia, demanding a 16% pay raise instead of the initially proposed 9%. After 6 days, the workers successfully achieved a 14% pay raise and ended the strikes.

== South Africa ==
Volkswagen of South Africa (VWSA) employs 6,000 workers and is a highly unionized workforce, with 80% of its workforce belonging to NUMSA, which is affiliated with COSATU and the wider Tripartite Alliance.

South African Motor Assemblers and Distributors Limited (SAMAD) agreed to manufacture Beetle cars in Uitenhage, Eastern Cape for Volkswagen. By 1956, VW acquired a controlling stake in SAMAD. In 1966, SAMAD was renamed to its present name Volkswagen of South Africa. That same year, the Apartheid government enacted legislation for white-only unions. VWSA began negotiating with the white-only South African Iron, Steel and Allied Industries Union. The International Metalworkers Federation pressured the Trade Union Council of South Africa to form parallel unions for Black, Coloured and Indian workers. By May 1969, half of VWSA's Coloured workers organized with the National Union of Motor Assembly and Rubber Workers of South Africa (NUMARWOSA) which was formally recognized by VWSA.

While legal bargaining rights existed for white, Coloured and Indian workers, none existed for Black workers. The 1973 Bantu Labour Relations Act for Black workers stipulated the creation of "liaison committees" on the plant level which were limited in power. Nonetheless, the VW liaison committee was dominated by future union representatives of the newly created United Automobile, Rubber, and Allied Workers Union of South Africa (UAW), the parallel union for Black workers.

NUMARWOSA and UAW eventually merged into a non-racial National Automobile and Allied Workers' Union which later merged into the modern day NUMSA.

=== 1980 Strike ===
Four years after the Soweto uprisings in 1980, Black workers of UAW at VWSA engaged in their first strike action. IG Metall and the International International Metalworker's Federation raised £38,000 for a strike fund and exerted pressure through VW Group on its subsidiary. The strike lasted three weeks, with no layoffs, a higher hourly wage of R1.45 and a strengthened union, despite the fact that Black unions were not legally recognized. In September 1980, VWSA became the first company in South Africa to pay for full time union representatives. Shortly afterwards, the InterSoli working groups were established. The South African working group was the most active.

== United States ==
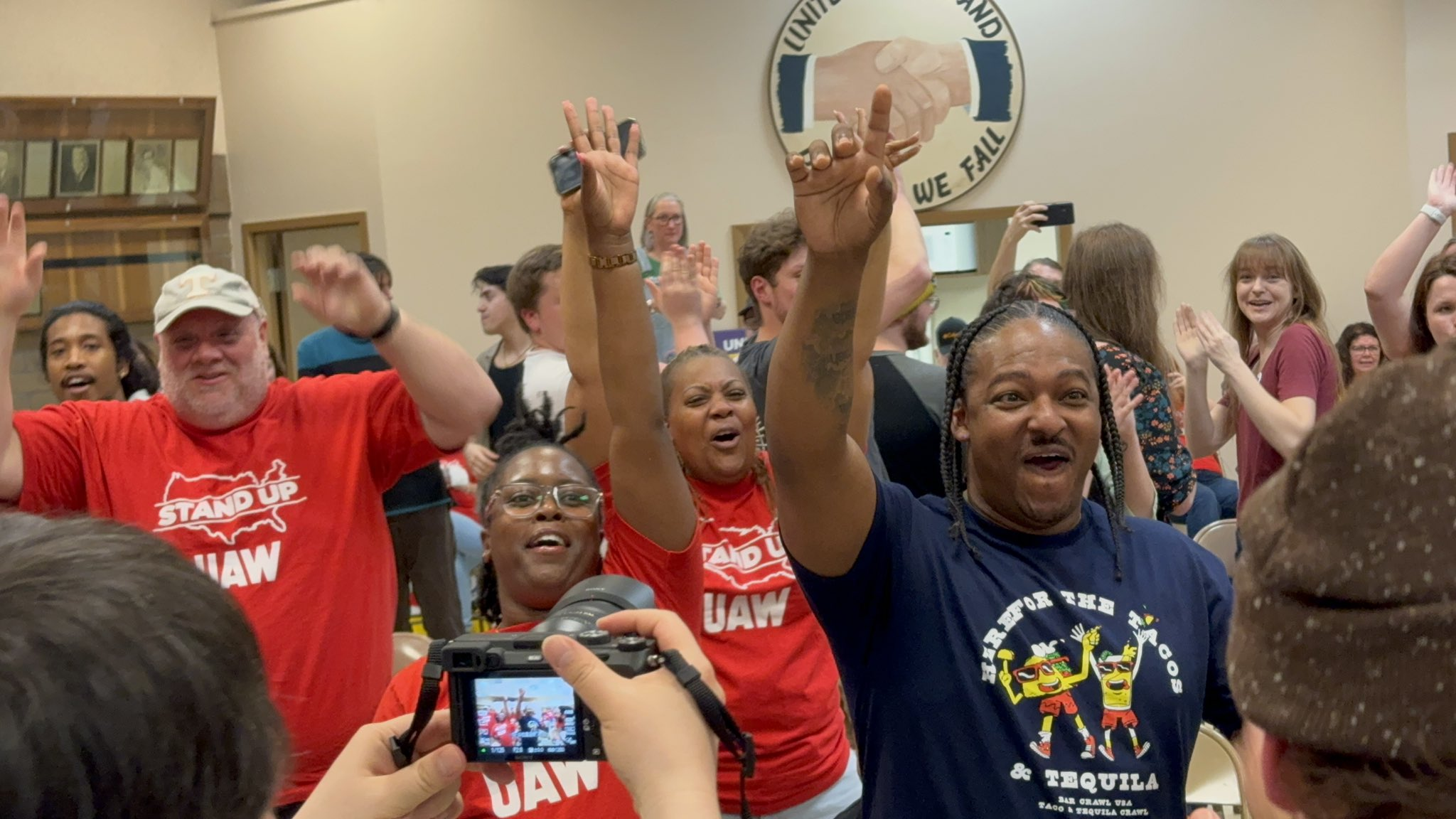
VW workers in Chattanooga, TN, celebrating after a successful UAW union vote on 19 April 2024

Volkswagen Group of America (VWoA) employs 6,000 employees as of 2022. Today it is one of the national affiliates of VW Group seats on the VW Global Works Council. In the 1980s, United Auto Workers represented the Volkswagen Westmoreland Assembly plant, before its closure in 1988. The present day Volkswagen Chattanooga Assembly Plant raised international headlines over high-profile union drives that were unsuccessful in 2014 and 2019. In 2024, VW Chattanooga workers voted overwhelmingly to unionize with the United Auto Workers.

=== Westmoreland, Pennsylvania ===
Volkswagen of America (VWoA) opened its first production plant in Westmoreland County, Pennsylvania in 1976 and renamed the plant to Volkswagen Westmoreland Assembly after acquiring it from Chrysler. VWoA immediately recognized the United Auto Workers via a card check. For the assembly line, Volkswagen did not develop its own skill base for Westmoreland, instead bringing in workers from Detroit, Michigan. 100 workers were also brought in from Great Britain. A pool of 40,000 people applied for jobs at Westmoreland. No more than 20% of the workers had ever worked for an automobile manufacturer before. The average age of workers was 24–26; at the time this was considered a demographic that was "independent and militant". VWoA chose employees not by skills, but by how long they had been unemployed.

From the outset, minorities picketed the site, seeking fair treatment in the hiring process and by its first 20 months of operation, workers had staged six walkouts. In a 1992 New York Times article, the plant was described as the only "transplant" factory that UAW had succeeded in representing, and that the plant "began with a strike and lurched from problem to problem before closing" in 1988.

On 13 October 1978, six months after the plant opened, UAW workers staged a wildcat strike at Westmoreland for salaries equal to those received by General Motors employees. Picketing workers chanted "No Money, No Bunny", in reference to the Golf vehicle internally nicknamed the Rabbit. In 1981, Westmoreland Assembly avoided a strike when it reached agreement with UAW over essentially the same issue: the disparity between wages earned at Westmoreland, where assemblers made an average of US$10.76 per hour, and those at auto plants in Detroit, where General Motors and Ford assemblers made an average of $11.42 per hour.

Volkswagen settled a 1983 discrimination suit with UAW to settle claims that they discriminated against Black employees at Westmoreland Assembly. Plaintiffs had sought $70 million when filing the lawsuit, charging that management had initiated or tolerated "a pattern and practice" of limited hiring and promotions of Black people, that Black workers were also subject to arbitrary firings and demotions and that the company openly allowed racial insults and threats in the workplace. Three days after the lawsuit was filed, a prominent Black executive at the Westmoreland Assembly and spokesman for the "VW Black Caucus" committed suicide, bringing further notoriety to the lawsuit. The presiding federal district judge said the case has turned into "a media event". VWoA denied the charges and later settled the case without admission of guilt in 1989, paying 800 plaintiffs $670,000 and the United Auto Workers $48,000. On 14 July 1988, VWoA closed the plant.

=== Chattanooga, Tennessee ===
The Volkswagen Chattanooga Assembly Plant attracted international attention in 2014 after it was proposed that employees elect a union in order to implement a Works Council that has co-determination, consultation and participation rights with management.

United Auto Workers (UAW) attempted unsuccessfully to unionize the Chattanooga plant in 2014. This was defeated in a 712 vs 626 vote. The unionization effort was backed by Volkswagen management and the IG Metall union in Germany. There was, however, considerable opposition from US business groups and Republican politicians. Despite a failed unionization vote at the plant, Volkswagen recognized members who have joined UAW Local 42. After the close vote against UAW, Volkswagen announced a new policy allowing groups representing at least 15% of the workforce to participate in meetings, with higher access tiers for groups representing 30% and 45% of employees. This prompted anti-UAW workers who opposed the first vote to form a rival union, the American Council of Employees. In December 2014, UAW was certified as representing more than 45% of employees.

UAW again attempted to unionize the plant in June 2019. This failed by a 52–48% margin. Unlike in 2014, Volkswagen management was not supportive of the union vote.

In 2023, UAW won 30 to 160% salary increases at the "Big Three". Shortly after, UAW launched organizing drives at 13 non-union auto manufacturers in the South, including Volkswagen. On 6 February 2024, UAW announced that over 50% of the 4,100 hourly workers at the plant have signed union membership cards. On 19 April 2024, the plant's workers voted to unionize, 73–27% margin, or 2,628 to 985. The first collective bargaining meeting was scheduled in September 2024, and an agreement was ratified 18 months later in February 2026. 96% of workers voted in favour of the new collective agreement, resulting in 20% salary increases and annual bonuses for duration of the agreement.

== See also ==
- IBM and unions
- Tesla and unions
- Apple and unions
- Google worker organization
