= Siemens and unions =

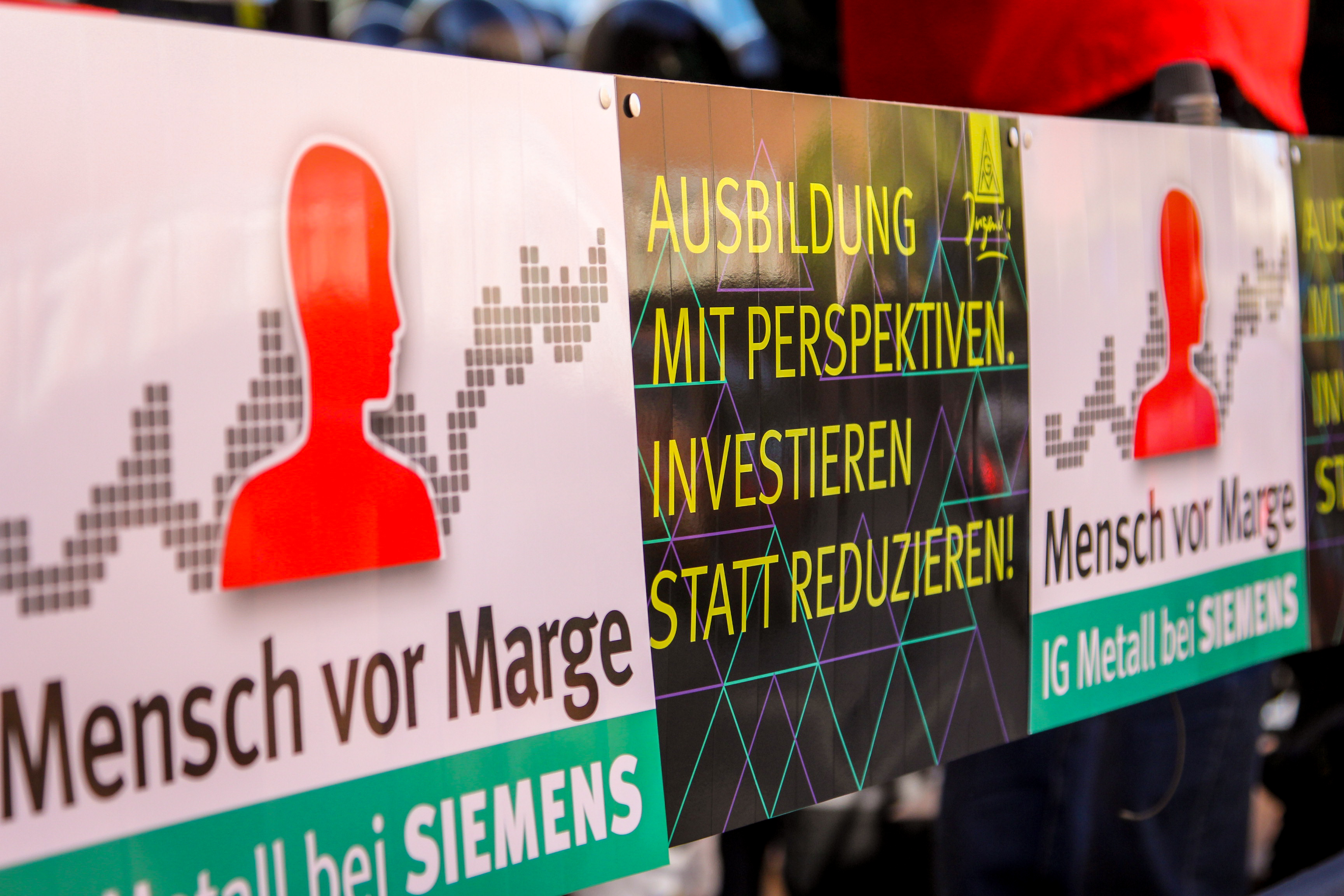
IG Metall youth day of action against Siemens in Bavaria. Banner says "people over [profit] margins" and "Vocational training with prospects. Investing instead of reducing!"

Siemens AG, a German manufacturer and research conglomerate, employs 327,000 employees globally as of 2024. Historically, Siemens supported and illegally financed the anti-union Works Council lists from AUB. More recently, the IG Metall has won the majority of Works Council seats. Employees in Europe are represented on the European Works Council, Siemens Europe Committee. In the United States, several unions represent a fraction of the workforce.

== Transnational activity ==
=== European Works Council Siemens ===
The 37 member European Works Council of Siemens AG is internally known as the Siemens Europe Committee (SEC). The SEC was formed in 1995 under 'voluntary basis', the same year the EU directive 94/45/EC was ratified.

=== Global coordination ===
The International Metalworkers' Federation organised a "Siemens World Council" meeting with trade union and employee representatives of all Siemens locations in either 1991 or 1993. In 2015, IG Metall international coordinator Dirk Linder facilitated the "Siemens Global Union Network".

== Germany ==
Siemens AG employs 170,000 workers in Germany. The union density is estimated to be a low 2 to 6 percent of employees, but the Works Council seats are dominated by IG Metall union members.

=== Supervisory board ===
Siemens AG has a 20 member supervisory board, with 10 members representing management and 10 representing employees. The employee side includes 3 IG Metall trade unionists and 7 Siemens employees who are members of Siemens European Works Council, Group Works Council, or the corresponding Central Works Councils of Siemens AG and its subsidiaries Siemens Mobility and Siemens Healthcare.

=== Works Councils ===
As of 2016, Siemens AG employees in Germany elected 95 different Works Councils, one for each factory plant (Betrieb). The Works Councils formally coordinate nation wide through a 58 member Central Works Council. This Central Works Council, along with the other Central Works Councils representing the subsidiary legal entities (e.g Siemens Mobility and Siemens Healthcare) of the Siemens Group coordinate through the Group Works Council. The Group Works Council and employee representatives from other Siemens countries form a 37 member European Works Council which is known internally as the Siemens Europe Committee (SEC). The SEC was formed in 1995 under a 'voluntary basis', the same year the EU directive 94/45/EC was ratified.

==== Management friendly influence ====
According to a 1921 edition of the Monthly Labor Review, Siemens president Carl Friedrich von Siemens promoted the company union movement through the organization "National Federation of German Unions" (German: Nationalverband Deutscher Gewerkschaften) in companies like Siemens and Krupp, in order to win representation in works councils and to 'resist bolshevization' of German life.

Arbeitsgemeinschaft Unabhängiger Betriebsangehöriger (AUB; Working Group of Independent Company Employees) was founded in the Siemens birth location Erlangen, Germany in 1974 as the Aktionsgemeinschaft Unabhängiger Betriebsräte (Action Group of Independent Works Councils). In 1985 it became a professional association and was renamed in 1986 to its present name. AUB illegally received over 30 million euros from Siemens through its chairman Wilhelm Schelsky. Its primary opponent is the IG Metall trade union. AUB runs its own list of candidates in Works Council elections and promotes in-house collective agreements over regional collective agreements.

=== Network Cooperation Initiative ===
The Network Cooperation Initiative (NCI) was founded in August 2002, as a self organised peer group for high-tech Siemens employees in the Munich plant. Formally independent of the existing Works Councils and IG Metall, during the mass layoff negotiations, NCI worked closely with the formers. NCI also ran its own list nominations during the Works Council elections in 2004 and 2006, forming a coalition with the IG Metall lists against the pro-management AUB list. The Relationship between IG Metall and NCI soured due to institutional mistrust and internal competition.

== United States ==
Siemens employs 60,000 workers in the United States as of 2014. A fraction of the workforce, 3,200 employees are covered under 14 collective bargaining agreements negotiated cumulatively by IBEW, IUE-CWA, Steelworkers, IAM, UAW and Teamsters. The largest bloc is IBEW's 800 members.

== See also ==
- IBM and unions
- Volkswagen and unions
- Tesla and unions

== External ==
- IG Metall and Siemens portal (English)
