= Electoral board (works council) =

Electoral board is responsible for running a works council election

The electoral board, also called an election committee (German: Wahlvorstand), is the group of employees responsible for overseeing the works council election resulting in the formation of a Works Council in Germany. The framework to establish an electoral board are described in §16-17a of the Works Constitution Act and its legal responsibilities are further supplemented in the Election Procedure.

== Composition ==
The electoral board typically consists of 3 non-executive employees who are eligible to vote in a Works Council election of that particular workplace establishment. The electoral board has a chairperson who represents the electoral board. In exceptional cases, a larger electoral board is possible, for example in a very large workplace. The number of members must remain odd per BetrVG §16. Trade unions can additionally send observer to all electoral board meetings.

== Tasks ==
The electoral board must prepare the Works Council elections without delay. It determines the time, place and eligibility of voters and candidates for the Works Council election. In order to carry out its duties effectively, the electoral board determine whether it needs any legal trainings, paid by the employer. Similar to a Works Council, all decisions are made through formal resolutions, passed by a simple majority of its members. After officially announcing the results of the Works Council election, the chairperson of the electoral board must hold a convening meeting with the newly elected Works Council. At that constituent meeting, the electoral board ceases to exist.

== Formation ==
Any existing Works Council whose term expires in less than 10 weeks, must appoint a new electoral board. If the Works Council fails to do so and if a Central or Group Works Council exists, they can appoint the electoral board instead per BetrVG §16.

In cases where no Group, Central or Works Council exists, the electoral board is elected directly by employees at an in-person election meeting (German: Wahlversammlung) per BetrVG §17. If the majority of employees present do not elect the members of an electoral board, a local labour court can appoint the members instead upon request.

The Economic and Social Research Institute of the Hans Boeckler Foundation documented different forms of obstruction against Works Council elections by employers. In 66% of cases, prevention of the formation of electoral board itself was a significant factor and in 13% of cases, "extraordinary termination" of individual members of the electoral board was a factor.

== Legal protections ==
Members of the electoral board can only be terminated from their workplace, through "extraordinary terminations" (a higher bar than regular termination) defined in the Dismissal Protection Act. Once an individual person leaves the electoral board (whether through resignation or because the electoral board itself ceases to exist), that individual continues to be protected from ordinary termination for six more months.
