= Zalando and trade unions =

The fashion e-commerce platform Zalando employs 17,000 people as of February 2023.

== Transnational ==
In 2015, a six-member (European Company) European Works Council was elected to represent 7,000 employees in Europe after Zalando changed its corporate structure to a European Company (SE). The low employee voter turnout of 25% in the SE European Works Council election was criticized by the German trade union ver.di. Zalando internally calls it the "International Employee Board". The SE European Works Council nominates 3 employee representatives in the supervisory board.

== Germany ==
A Hans-Boeckler foundation report criticized Zalando in 2019 for its usage of an internal HR software called Zonar. This software would enable corporate employees to peer-review each other, which would affect pay and job security. The feedback initially was stored indefinitely, inaccessible to the person being rated and up to 8 fellow employees provided the feedback. After new safeguards were imposed by the Berlin Data Protection Authority, the data retention period became temporary, feedback is now accessible to the affected employee and a maximum of 3 people could provide feedback.

Logistics workers in Mönchengladbach went on strike for the third time in December 2024. They want to be included in the retail and logistics sectoral collective agreement. Even with recent salary raises, Zalando warehouse workers make 4 euros less than the sectoral collective agreement standards. Several hundred employees participated in the strike shortly before Christmas, which was called for by the ver.di trade union.

=== Works councils ===
Employees in Berlin elected a local Works Council, as defined in the German Works Constitution Act for the first time in October 2020. It would represent 5,000 employees of Zalando SE in Berlin and is distinct from the SE European Works Council.

According to Zalando, there are 8-local works councils at the logistic sites in Erfurt, Lahr and Mönchengladbach, the Zalando Studios, Zalando Marketing Services, Customer Care DACH, Customer Care International and Zalando SE. The two Zalando SE works councils in Berlin and Dortmund provide for a general works council.
