= Daniela Cavallo =

German business executive

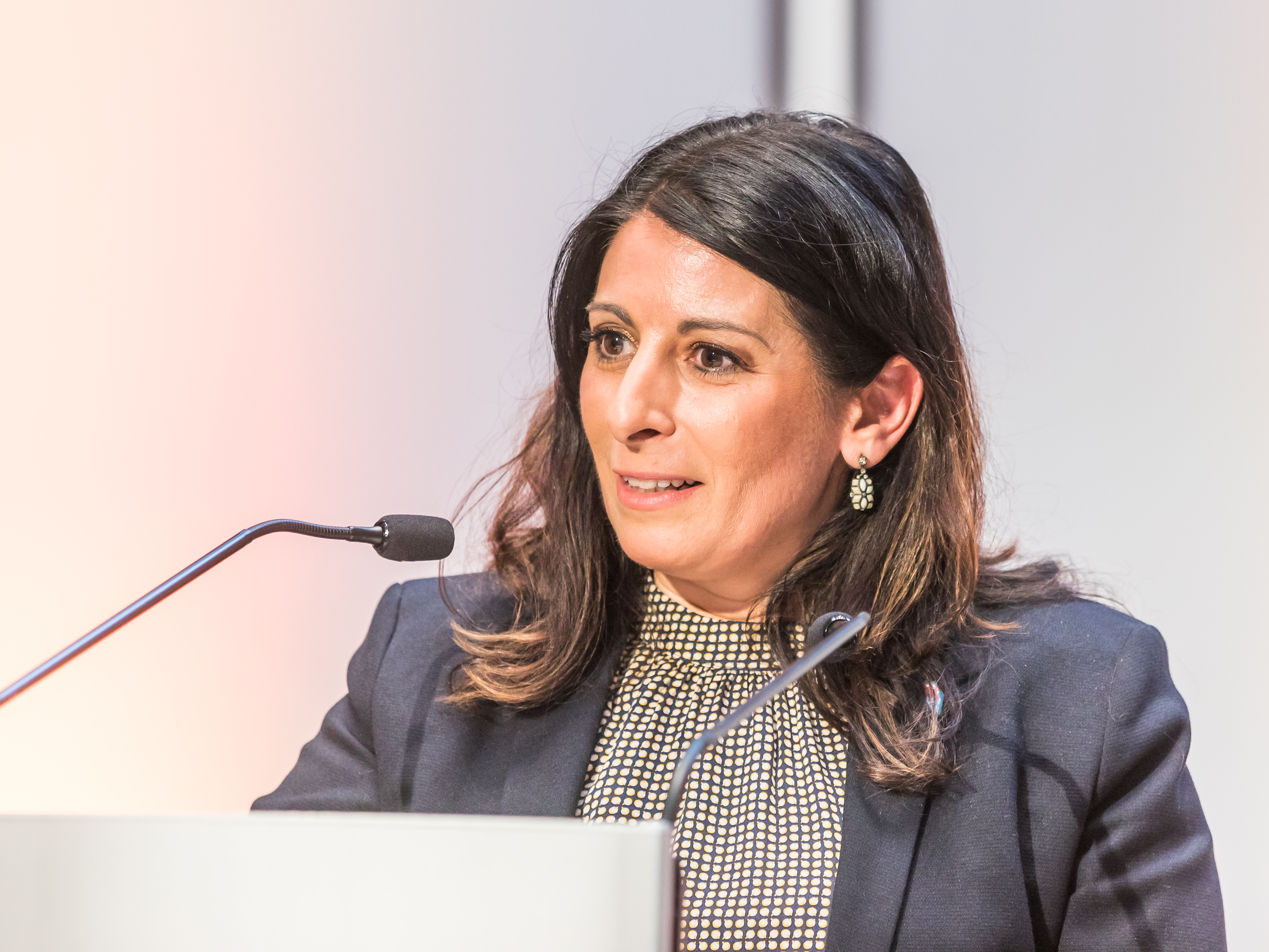
- Cavallo in 2023
- Born: 3 April 1975 (age 51); Wolfsburg, Lower Saxony, West Germany
- Occupation: Business executive
- Known for: Chairman of Volkswagen Group

Daniela Cavallo (born 3 April 1975) is a German business executive who has been chairwoman of the Group, General and local Works Council of the Volkswagen Group since May 2021.

== Career ==
Cavallo was born to Italian parents. Her father came to Wolfsburg with the first wave of guest workers and worked at the Wolfsburg Volkswagen Plant. According to the financial news website Business Insider, her Italian origin is important to her. She feels like at home in both countries, but she is really at home in Wolfsburg. After graduating from high school in 1994, she completed an apprenticeship as an office clerk at Volkswagen and qualified as a business administrator. She was also involved in Youth and Trainee representation.

In 2002, Cavallo was elected to the Works Council of the then Volkswagen subsidiary Auto 5000. After the birth of her children, she interrupted her work between 2004 and 2008 as the first Works Council member at Volkswagen for maternal leave. Cavallo has been a member of the Volkswagen General Works Council since 2013. In 2019, she was elected as deputy chair of the General and Group Works Council. After Bernd Osterloh left as chair to became the new Chief Human Resources Officer at the Volkswagen commercial vehicle subsidiary Traton, Cavallo took over on 23 April 2021 as the chair.

== Reception ==
According to Die Tageszeitung and Manager Magazin, Cavallo "is now in what is probably the most powerful position on the employee side in German industry". Cavallo's predecessor Osterloh describes her as "strong leadership, empathic and so strategically thinking that many will be surprised".

== See also ==
- Volkswagen and unions
