= Works agreement =

Special agreement concluded between works council and employer

A works agreement (German: Betriebsvereinbarung; plural: Betriebsvereinbarungen; BV) is a special type of agreement in German labour law between a works council and the employer, described in §77 of the Works Constitution Act. It is distinct from collective agreements negotiated by trade unions.

== Parties ==
The works agreement must be recorded in writing and signed with a wet-ink signature by both parties, the employer (typically the executive director) and the works council chair. Alternatively, the chair of the conciliation committee appointed by both parties may sign the document in the event of a failed negotiation. The employer and the works council can unilaterally terminate a works agreement unless otherwise specified.

Central works agreements and group works agreements are not defined in the Works Constitution Act. Rather, they are a popular naming convention to describe works agreements concluded by central works councils and group works councils.

The employer is usually responsible for implementing the works agreement. The signing works council and individual employees mentioned in the scope can also enforce the terms of the works agreement, for example going to labour court if the employer does not comply with it.

== Scope ==
§77 of the Works Constitution Act specifies that works agreements cannot deal with matters, primarily dealt through collective bargaining, i.e., wage increases. Section §87(1) outlines 14 different areas of enforceable co-determination, insofar as they are not already regulated in existing collective agreements specific to that company and industry, unless such collective agreements explicitly permit supplementary works agreements.

Works agreements can be concluded for topics internal to the works council itself, for example a central works agreement on its membership size.

== Types of agreements ==
The Works Constitution Act distinguishes between enforceable and voluntary works agreements.

§87(2) specifies in the event of a failed negotiation for the 14 enforceable topics covered in §87(1), a conciliation committee can provide an award in the form of a works agreement. For matters covered in §88, the employer and works council can only conclude a works agreement on a voluntary basis, with no possibility of escalating to a conciliation committee.

== Duration and expiration ==
A works agreement can be valid for an unlimited period of time or be scoped to a specific time period or action. If a "short time work" works agreement was introduced for the year 2021, it would expire in 2022, while a works agreement on regular working hours would be valid for an unlimited time period, unless otherwise specified.

The notice period for terminating a works agreement is typically 3 months and can be terminated unilaterally by either the employer or the works council per §77(5). For enforceable works agreements, there is an after-effect, which means even if the works agreement expires or is terminated, the agreement remains valid until a new one is concluded. This after-effect does not apply to voluntary works agreements.

== In practice ==
The Hans Boeckler Foundation has a non public database of 17,000 works agreements (Im Archiv Betriebliche Vereinbarungen, 'In the archive of works agreements'), the largest such collection.

In a 2017 survey by the Economic and Social Research Institute (WSI) of the Hans Boeckler Foundation, they interviewed members of 2,000 works councils and found that each works council had on average 22 works agreements. Small works councils (representing 50 employees or less) had an average of 12 works agreements, while larger works councils (representing 500+ employees) had an average of 44 works agreements.

Companies covered by collective agreements were more likely to also have works agreements. Collective agreements can be complementary and contain opening clauses that expand or encourage works agreements.

Around 15 percent of all companies with at least one works agreement, have a works agreement that was awarded through a conciliation committee. In larger companies, this ratio increases to 25 percent.

The Works Constitution Act specifies that local works councils are not subordinate to central and group works councils, however in practice, central works councils are increasingly given more responsibility and influence in the workplace. A 2006 survey commissioned by the Economic and Social Research Institute (WSI) interviewed members of 2,000 works councils and their corresponding 283 central works councils. The survey responses indicated that central works councils signed (central) works agreements more frequently than local works councils in 15 out of 23 categories.
