= Marie-Luise Hilger =

Marie-Luise Hilger (17 August 1912 – 25 December 1996) was a German lawyer and chair judge at the Federal Labour Court.

Hilger was appointed in 1959 as one of the first women at a supreme court of the federal government to judge at the Federal Labour Court. This was followed in 1973 by her appointment as chairwoman judge at the Federal Labour Court.
