= Degenkolb =

Degenkolb is a German surname. Notable people with the surname include:

- Carl Degenkolb (1796–1862), German industrialist
- Henry J. Degenkolb (1913–1989), American structural engineer
- John Degenkolb (born 1989), German cyclist
