= German company law =

German company law (Gesellschaftsrecht) is an influential legal regime for companies in Germany. The primary form of company is the public company or Aktiengesellschaft (AG). A private company with limited liability is known as a Gesellschaft mit beschränkter Haftung (GmbH). A partnership is called a Kommanditgesellschaft (KG).

== History ==
In Germany, through most of the 19th century the Kommanditgesellschaft (société en commandite in France) was the typical form of business organisation. A "KG" had at least one member with unlimited liability, but other investors' liability was limited to their contribution. A special concession was not required for setting up this company. The first German public company statute was the Prussian Act of 1794. In 1861 the Allgemeines Deutsches Handelsgesetzbuch or the General Commercial Code for all of Germany, as well as Austria, was enacted, which devoted a section to joint stock companies. This allowed incorporation with limited liability. Companies would be constituted with a single board of directors, though they had the option of a two-tiered board system, involving shareholders appointing a supervisory board, which could in turn elect the management board.

There were updates to the Allgemeines Deutsches Handelsgesetzbuch in the Aktiennovelle von 1870 (New Company Act 1870) and again in 1884. The 1884 reform mandated that companies have a two-tier board, with the justification that free registration rather than a system of state concession meant a supervisory board was needed to take over the state's monitoring role. The members of the supervisory board were not allowed to serve on the management board. However, shareholders could still directly elect management board members if they so wished. Further reforms led to the Handelsgesetzbuch of 1897, but without changing the basic structure.

== Public listed companies ==
=== Shareholder rights ===
Shareholders have a list of specific rights allocated to them by the Aktiengesetz, although this is circumscribed by the general principle in AktG §119(2) that issues concerning 'business leadership' can only be determined by the executive directors. The voting rights of shareholders are heavily influenced by the banks. Banks appropriate the votes of people who must deposit their share certificates in banks' accounts. The notable rights for shareholders are as follows

- the right to vote, with one share one vote. Preferential shares without voting rights can, however, be issued.
- to call a meeting with 20% of the votes, AktG §122
- a non-binding say on pay, AktG §120
- changes to the constitution by a three quarter majority, AktG §179
- the right to vote or veto 'substantial' property transactions. There is no fixed percentage for this doctrine, which was developed by the courts, but it will be triggered if the management attempts to sell off assets that compose a large or important part of the business, Holzmüller (1982) BGHZ 83, 122.
- the use of profits from the accounts, AktG §119(1)(ii)
- appointment of auditors, AktG §119(1)(iv and vii)
- raising or reducing capital, AktG §119(1)(vi)
- winding up, AktG §119(1)(viii)

There is no right to control political donations (cf AktG §58).

=== Directors' duties ===
German directors have similar duties to most jurisdictions, primarily a duty of loyalty, and a duty to exercise competent judgment. First, the duty of loyalty, or Treuepflicht, derives from the good faith provision in the civil code (BGB §242).

Second, there is a particular prohibition on taking corporate opportunities and a duty of secrecy, AktG §93(1).

Third, there is a specific prohibition on competing with the company, AktG §88.

Fourth, recently introduced was a 'business judgment rule'. A new provision, AktG §93(1) says, 'executive members have to exercise the care of an ordinary and conscientious business leader'.

=== Derivative litigation ===
While German corporate theory posits that the supervisory board should do the work of protecting minority shareholders, and is expected to do the litigating against the executive (AktG §111), minority shareholders may also bring claims against directors. Under AktG §147, ten per cent of shareholders, or those with over €1,000,000 may bring a claim against a director for breach of duty. They will have a special representative appointed to carry out the litigation and the company will pay the costs. There is also a procedure for one per cent of shareholders, or those with an interest over €100,000 to bring a claim (AktG §148). Here the court is more stringent, and like the derivative claim in the UK can strike out an application if it finds reasons for it are lacking. There have been cases where the courts have held that majority shareholders owe a duty of good faith to minority shareholders, but also that minorities who can block actions by the company owe duties to the majority.

=== Corporate governance ===
Analogous to the UK Corporate Governance Code, which is also a 'comply or explain' law, is the Deutsche Corporate Governance Kodex (AktG §161). It replicates a lot of rules already found in the Aktiengesetz.

- AktG §87, requires that pay for the executive is set by the supervisory board. In 2009, this was amended so that (1) pay could not exceed the normal level without special justifications, and (2) if performance had deteriorated, executive pay could be reduced to an equitable level.
- AtkG §120(4) was added so that the general meeting of shareholders (not employees!) have a non-binding say on pay.
- AktG §113 says that the pay for supervisory board members can either be fixed by the company constitution, and changed by ordinary majority vote, or be determined on a resolution of the shareholders.
- AktG §119(1)(iv and vii) auditors are appointed by the shareholders. Apart from that the supervisory board should also have an audit committee, which handles the audit business.

=== Employees ===
Under the Mitbestimmungsgesetz, in companies with more than 2,000 employees, workers elect just under half of the members of the supervisory board, although shareholders retain a casting majority through the chair. In companies with more than 500 employees, one third of the supervisory board must be composed of employee representatives under the Drittelbeteiligungsgesetz. Companies with fewer than 500 employees have no automatic statutory requirement for employee representation on the supervisory board.

At workplace level, employees are represented through elected works councils under the Betriebsverfassungsgesetz (Works Constitution Act). In establishments with at least five employees eligible to vote, workers may elect a works council, which has information, consultation, and in some areas codetermination rights on matters such as working time arrangements, workplace rules, health and safety measures, and the introduction of technical systems used to monitor employees. In businesses with more than 20 employees, the employer must consult the works council over planned dismissals, and in cases of major operational changes, including mass redundancies, employees may seek a reconciliation of interests and a social plan, with unresolved disputes subject to conciliation procedures.

German labour law also provides protections against unfair dismissal through the Kündigungsschutzgesetz, which generally applies to establishments above a minimum size threshold and after a qualifying period of employment. Collective bargaining between employers and trade unions plays a central role in determining wages and working conditions, and collective agreements may operate alongside statutory codetermination rights.

=== Directors ===
A large German company is required to have a two tier board system. The basic difference to the law, for instance, in the UK, Sweden or the US, is that an executive directors cannot be removed directly by the members of the company (i.e. shareholders typically, and sometimes employees) but only by a second tier "supervisory" board. The Aktiengesetz §76 the executive's primary role is to manage the company, or look after its day-to-day affairs. By contrast under Aktiengesetz §111 the supervisory board's role is stated to be to "supervise" (überwachen). Originally a supervisory board was a default requirement, so companies could choose whether to have one or not. The practice became utilised in most companies by the 1920s, however in the Aktiengesetz 1937, German law made it a requirement to have a supervisory board. This remained in the post-war reforms.

Members of the executive ("Vorstand", often translated as 'management board') are generally appointed for five years. They can be removed by the supervisory board, but only for a "good reason" (AktG §84(3) ein wichtiger Grund). This includes a vote of no confidence by the shareholders. However, the supervisory board is not bound to act upon a shareholder vote. Within the executive although all members will generally be appointed by the supervisory board, in companies with over 2000 people there must be one 'staff director', Arbeitsdirektor, on the executive who is intended to hold the confidence of the employees, under Mitbestimmungsgesetz 1976 §33. Typically this will mean that staff director is nominated by the unions, though no formal procedure is prescribed.

In companies with over 2000 employees, the supervisory board ("Aufsichtsrat") is composed of half shareholder appointees (Aktiengesetz §§102 and 119) who can only remove the supervisory board members on a 75% vote (AktG §§102-103). The other half is elected by the employees, though in companies with over 8000 employees the employees can let the unions vote on their behalf (Mitbestimmungsgesetz §§7 and 9). However, one chairperson with the casting vote invariably is chosen by shareholders. Initially both the shareholder and employee sides are meant to reach a consensus on the chair. If they cannot reach consensus, it will go to arbitration, and if a solution is still not reached, the shareholders get to choose (Mitbestimmungsgesetz §27).

== See also ==
- German law
- German contract law
- UK company law
- US corporate law
- List of company registers
