= Conciliation committee =

Conciliation committee may refer to:

- Conciliation committee (works council), an arbitration process for German Works council
- Trilogue meeting, a part of the European Union legislative procedure
- Conciliation Committee for Woman Suffrage, 1910-1912 British committee chaired by Lord Lytton
- Lytton Commission, 1931-1932 League of Nations committee also chaired by Lord Lytton
