= Control Council Law No 22 =

1946 German labour law

Control Council Law No 22, Works Councils (10 April 1946) was a German labour law drafted by the Allied Control Council to enable the formation of work councils in rebuilding the economy and society after World War II. Work councils, which employees of a firm organised and elected democratically to determine workplace issues, had existed in Germany in various forms since 1889. They had been abolished by Adolf Hitler's Nazi party. The new Control Council Law No 22 provided a template for democratic German trade unions to re-organise through collective agreements with employers.

== Contents ==
The key provisions of the new Law were articles I and V, empowering trade unions to organise work councils, and providing a template set of rights for elected representatives.

Article I

The organization and activities of Works Councils (Betriebsräte) to represent the professional, economic and social interests of the workers and employees in each individual enterprise are hereby permitted throughout Germany.

[...]

Article V

1. Works Councils may have as their basic functions any of the following matters relating to the protection of the interests of the workers and employees of an enterprise except insofar as these matters are governed by or are subject to any restriction by regulations having the force of law:

a) Negotiations with employers on the application of collective agreements and of internal regulations to individual enterprises.
b) Negotiations of agreements with the employers regarding factory regulations for the protection of labor, including such matters as safety pre-cautions, medical facilities, factory hygiene, working conditions, rules for engagements, dismissals, and settlement of grievances.
c) Submission of proposals to the employer for the improvement of methods of work and organization of production for the purpose of avoiding unemployment.
d) Investigation of grievances and discussion thereof with the employer; assistance to the workers, employees and Trade Unions in the preparation of cases for submission to factory inspectors, social insurance and labor protection authorities, labor courts and other agencies for settling labor disputes.
e) Co-operation with the authorities in the prevention of all war production and in the denazification of public and private enterprises. Participation in the creation of management of social works designed for the welfare of the workers of an enterprise, including nurseries, medical assistance, sports, etc.

2. Each Works Council shall determine its specific functions and procedure within the limits set forth in this law.

== Development ==
The Control Council Law No 22 was replaced by a more comprehensive Betriebsverfassungsgesetz 1952 (Work Constitutions Act 1952) once the new German constitution had passed in 1949, and a democratic government had been elected.

== See also ==
- Codetermination
- Control Council Law No. 1 - Repealing of Nazi Laws
