= University of Stirling v UCU =

UK Supreme Court case from 2015

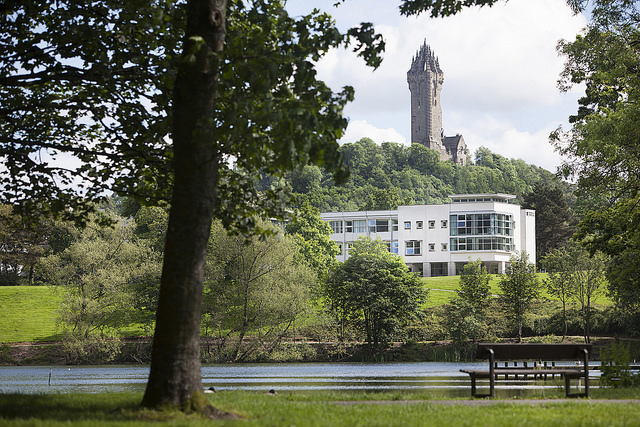
- Court: Supreme Court
- Citation: [2015] UKSC 26

Court membership
- Judges sitting: Baroness Hale; Lord Wilson; Lord Sumption; Lord Reed; Lord Hughes

Case opinions
- Baroness Hale

Keywords
- Information and consultation

University of Stirling v UCU [2015] UKSC 26 is a UK labour law case, concerning the information and consultation in the European Union.

== Facts ==
In 2009 to deal with a budget deficit, the University of Stirling proposed 140 redundancies. Under TULRCA 1992 section 188, it consulted with UCU but did not do so for employees on limited term contracts, which ended in the consultation period. UCU claimed they should be included and were dismissed as redundant.

The Tribunal held the employees were dismissed as redundant in three cases, but not a fourth. The EAT held all four were dismissed, but none as redundant. The Inner House agreed.

== Judgment ==
Baroness Hale held that the employees were dismissed as redundant. Expiry was a dismissal. And second, the dismissal was ‘for a reason not related to the individual concerned’ under TULRCA 1992 s 195(1). The fact that a person entered a contract for a limited could not mean that expiry was for a reason related to the individual. Parliament never intended to narrow the scope of consultation duties.

4. Dr Harris was employed as a post-doctoral research assistant. Her contract was due to expire on 16 August 2009 and the University resolved not to renew it. Dr Doyle was employed to co-ordinate and deliver three undergraduate modules in English Studies in the spring semester of 2009. Her contract was not renewed when the semester ended on 29 May 2009. Ms Fife was employed to provide maternity cover, initially until 2 May 2009, extended until 4 September 2009, and again until 9 October 2009. Between 10 October 2009 and 10 September 2010 she was employed on a casual basis. Ms Kelly was originally employed to provide sick leave cover for one month in July 2007, and then from 1 October 2007 to 31 March 2008. Her employment was then extended until 30 September 2008 and then to 30 September 2009, partly because she was a named researcher on a number of projects and partly to cover for a colleague who was working reduced hours after returning from maternity leave.

[...]

21. The context and content of the duty to consult all suggest that it is concerned with the needs of the business or undertaking as a whole. The employer has to explain why he wishes to make a substantial number of employees redundant, which descriptions of employee he proposes to make redundant, and how he proposes to choose among the employees within those descriptions. Employees on LTCs might be a description of employees for this purpose, and being on an LTC might be a criterion for selecting for dismissal, but it is a collective description rather than a reason relating to the individual concerned.

22. Where an LTC comes to an end, the "dismissal" in question is the non-renewal of the LTC – or rather the failure to offer a new contract, the LTC having come to an end. The fact that it was an LTC, or even that the employee agreed to it, cannot by itself be a reason for the non-renewal. Many LTCs are in fact renewed or new contracts offered. The question is whether the reasons for the failure to offer a new contract relate to the individual or to the needs of the business. Sometimes, no doubt, it will relate to the individual. The employer may still need to have the work done, but for one reason or another considers that this employee is not suitable to do it. That would not be a dismissal for redundancy. But the ending of a research project or the ending of a particular undergraduate course would not be a reason related to the individual employee but a reason related to the employer's business. The business no longer has a need for someone to do the research or someone to teach the course. The same would usually be true of the ending of maternity or sickness cover. The need for the job would not have ended but the need for the job to be done by someone other than the person who usually does it would have ended. That too is not a reason related to the individual employee but a reason related to the employer's business.

23. In short, the Employment Appeal Tribunal stated an admirable test: "A reason relates to the individual if it is something to do with him such as something he is or something he has done. It is to be distinguished from a reason relating to the employer, such as his (or in the case of insolvency, his creditors') need to effect business change in some respect". The error was to place the coming to an end of an LTC into the first rather than the second category.

Lord Wilson, Lord Sumption, Lord Reed and Lord Hughes agreed.

== See also ==
- UK labour law
- Codetermination
