= Carl Degenkolb =

German industrialist

Carl Degenkolb (1796-1862) was a German industrialist, who is generally understood to have pioneered the first codetermination plans in his factories, as well as participating in drafting the first codetermination law during the failed 1848 Revolutions.

== See also ==
- German labour law
