= Trade unions in Germany =

- National organization(s): DGB
- Regulatory authority: Federal Ministry of Labour and Social Affairs
- Primary legislation: Article 9, Paragraph 3 of the Basic Law

International Labour Organization
- Germany is a member of the ILO

Convention ratification
- Freedom of Association: March 20, 1957
- Right to Organise: June 8, 1956

Trade unions in Germany have a history reaching back to the German revolution in 1848, and still play an important role in the German economy and society.

The most important labor organization is the German Confederation of Trade Unions (Deutscher Gewerkschaftsbund, or DGB), which is the umbrella association of eight single trade unions for individual economic sectors, representing more than 6 million people as of 2014. The largest single trade union is the IG Metall, which as of 2014 organizes about 2.3 million members in metal (including automobile and machine building), electronics, steel, textile, wood and synthetics industries.

In 2022, half of all German workers were covered by collective bargaining agreements. In Germany, unions and employer associations bargain at the industry-region level. These large-scale agreements have broad coverage and lead to considerable standardization in wages and employment conditions across the country. Some bargaining occurs at the firm level.

== Current situation ==
The German Confederation of Trade Unions ("Deutscher Gewerkschaftsbund" (DGB)) is the largest umbrella organization of unions in Germany. The eight different unions that belong to it cover many sectors of German industry, public services such as police, and higher and professional education. In 2001, DGB united 84% of all union members in Germany. While the number of members was over eleven million in 1991, it has reduced to 6.19 million in 2010. Of these members, about two thirds were actively employed. The following list shows the unions belonging to DGB:

- IG Metall (IGM)
- Vereinte Dienstleistungsgewerkschaft (ver.di)
- IG Bergbau, Chemie, Energie (IG BCE)
- IG Bauen-Agrar-Umwelt (IG BAU)
- Gewerkschaft Nahrung-Genuss-Gaststätten (NGG)
- Eisenbahn- und Verkehrsgewerkschaft (EVG)
- Gewerkschaft Erziehung und Wissenschaft (GEW)
- Gewerkschaft der Polizei (GdP)

In the 1990s, about three quarters of members of worker councils belonged to the DGB. This number has slightly reduced since then: in 2010, it was 68%.

== Other umbrella organizations ==
Other umbrella organizations that are not part of the DGB are:

- German Civil Service Federation (DBB) with 1.28 million members. (2015) and a focus on civil service representation. In the public sector, DBB member unions compete with the DGB unions ver.di, GEW, and GdP..
- Christian Trade Union Federation of Germany (CGB) with, according to its own figures, approximately 280,000 members in 12 individual unions.

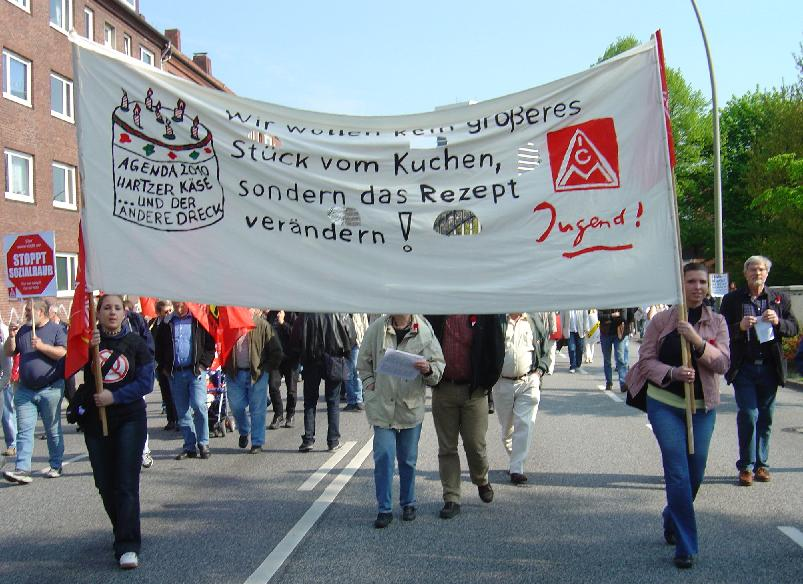
DGB Trade Union Youth

== Legal status ==
Unions are considered to be social policy coalitions that are especially protected under the constitutionally guaranteed right of forming associations for the preservation and promotion of working and economic conditions. Agreements that restrict or obstruct this right are therefore invalid and illicit (Basic Law for the Federal Republic of Germany, article 9, paragraph 3).

== History ==
=== 1329: Strike of the journeymen ===
There are sources of strikes and labor conflicts from the early Middle Ages in Germany. They were first fought by journeymen. In 1329, in Breslau, a group of brass locksmiths put down their work. In 1389, in Konstanz, it was the tailors, and in 1469, in Altenberg, it was the miners. More known is the uprising of the weavers in Schlesien in 1844.

=== 1848/49 and 1865: The first trade unions ===
While workers' associations were representing the workers' class in the pre-March era, the first trade unions were founded on a national level in the revolution of 1848/49. In the tradition of the guild constitution, these unions restricted themselves to single occupational groups.

After the establishment of the association of pressmen, associations of cigarette, textile, and metal workers were founded in the expanding German cities. In addition, there were associations of miners, tailors, bakers, shoe makers and construction workers.

The Association of Cigarworkers Germany was founded in Berlin in 1848. In 40 other German cities, similar associations followed. The General German Cigar Workers Society ("Allgemeiner Deutsche Cigarrenarbeiter-Verein"), established in Leipzig in 1865, was the first centrally organized union in Germany. This union became the model for many newly founded unions and is a predecessor for the Food, Beverages and Catering Union. In 1867, the Society of German Engineers (Verein Deutscher Lokomotivführer (VDL)) was established. After the Weimar Constitution allowed civil servants the right of freedom of association, VDL became the Union of German Engineers (Gewerkschaft Deutscher Lokomotivführer (GDL)). The GDL is still active today and is therefore the oldest union in Germany.

=== Obstructions against unions ===
After decades of repression and obstructions through authorities, unionist organizations emerged in the pre-March era and during the German revolutions of 1848–1849 and articulated their demands. The failure of the revolution and the following phase of restoration, however, lead to a loss of strength in the union movement and caused new repressions against unions. Only new reforms in 1869 and 1871, enabled unions to develop as trade partners of entrepreneurs' associations. An example of these reforms is the trade regulation act that introduced the freedom of association and the freedom of trade. The workers' class had to fight for a living wage, while the business owners enjoyed feudalistic privileges. The unions were first interested to improve the situation of their members. They led labor conflicts, strikes and boycotts against the business owners. This increase in power and the danger for the governing system caused authorities to ban unions or to obstruct them by law. Generally prohibited were unionist activities between 1878 and 1890 through Otto von Bismarck's Socialist Law ("Bismarcksches Sozialistengesetz").

Only with the Halbergerstadter Congress in 1892, the unions gained power and influence again. On March 14, 1892, Carl Legien convened the Charter Conference of the General Commission of Unions in Germany ("Gründungskonferenz der Generalkommission der Gewerkschaften Deutschlands"). The unions with the largest numbers of members were thereby joining an umbrella organization in the German Reich. according to John A. Moses, the German trade unions were not directly affiliated with the Social Democratic Party. The SPD leadership insisted on the primacy of politics, and refused to emphasize support for union goals and methods. The unions led Carl Legien (1861–1920) developed their own nonpartisan political goals.

=== Classification based on professional and political orientation ===
The German unions oriented themselves based on the policies of political parties and occupation or occupation groups, and not based on the principle of one company equals one union. These occupational unions are going back to the traditional guild constitution and the stipulations of the Halberstadter Congress. The ADGB and Afa-Coalition were close to the Social Democratic Party (SPD), the Christian Unions were close to the Catholic Center Party, the RGO was close to the Communist Party of Germany (KPD), the DHV was close to the right-conservative German National People's Party (DNVP), and in the final phase of the Weimar Republic, it was even close to the Nazi Party (NSDAP). The syndicalist Free Workers-Union Germany ("Freie Arbeiter-Union Deutschlands (FAUD)") completely opposed party politics.

=== Enforced political conformity during National Socialism ===
On 2 May 1933, the Sturmabteilung occupied the union halls and the Nazi government enforced political conformity among the unions. The wealth of the unions was transferred to the Nazi German Labour Front ("Deutsche Arbeitsfront (DAF)") under Robert Ley. In the DAF, many former union members were represented, although membership was not enforced. In 1944, the DAF was the largest mass organization in Nazi Germany, with about 25 million members.

=== Rebuilding the unions after the Second World War ===
After the Second World War, the unions were rebuilt in Germany. The first leader of the German Trade Union Confederation, Hans Böckler, wanted all employees to be in a single unified labor union that had no political affiliation. However, the IG Metall, among others, resisted this idea.

In 1949, the Charter Congress of the Federation of German Trade Unions took place in Munich under the leadership of Hans Böckler. Both the prime minister of the Free State of Bavaria, Hans Ehard, CDU, and the labor secretary of the Federal Republic of Germany, Anton Storch, CDU, attended this congress.

Despite the calls to unite, the occupationally oriented association of civil servants and the German Salaried Employees' Union ("Deutsche Angestellten-Gewerkschaft (DAG)") were founded. In 1950, the Christian Trade Union Federation of Germany ("Christlicher Gewerkschaftsbund") was established but it never reached a high number of members.

The German unions DGB, DAG and the German Civil Service Federation became partners in collective bargaining with companies and the German government. They also influenced law making in the labor and social sectors.

=== Unions in the German Democratic Republic ===
After World War II, the Free German Trade Union Federation (German: Freier Deutscher Gewerkschaftsbund, FDGB) was founded in the Soviet occupation zone. The Soviet Military Administration in Germany increasingly required Communists to be represented in trade union leadership. After the foundation of the Socialist Unity Party of Germany (German: Sozialistische Einheitspartei Deutschlands, SED) through a forced merger between the KPD and the SPD in 1946, purges were implemented immediately. Christian-social and other independent social-democratic union members were dismissed and had to flee to West Germany.

After the failed uprising in the GDR on June 17, 1953, the remaining independent unionists were considered to be "reenlistee" (German: Kapitulanten) or western agents and were dismissed from their office. This included the leader of the "IG Bau Holz", Franz Jahn, and almost all members of its board. The FDGB thus finally became a mass organization in the GDR controlled by the governing party.

=== Unions After the German Reunification ===
Even in 1989, the FDGB was not at the head of the democratic movement. While forced reelections brought new leaders into the FDGB, it was considered to be impossible to reform and was dissolved in early 1990. Although the unions of the different economic branches of the GDR made contact with the corresponding unions in West Germany, the unions of the DGB decided to create new regional and local union structures. This decision was supported by a lot of union members from the GDR.

The unions first gained multiple millions of new members. However, after the collapse of the east German industry, the unions lost a lot of their new members. In the 1990s, the number of unions in the DGB was reduced from sixteen to eight. This was achieved by merging multiple unions into a single union for a whole economic branch. The DAG also joined the DGB as part of the merged union "ver.di".

=== Branch Specific Unions ===
Because certain specialized branches considered themselves to be poorly represented through the DGB, they founded their own separate unions. Examples for this are the VC, GdF, GDL and the Marburger association of clinicians. Some of these smaller unions have a degree of organization that is much higher than the average, up to 80%.

=== Weakening of the DGB ===
In 2007, an attempt of a company to influence unions became publicly known that had been unprecedented in the history of German unions. Already in the late 1970s, the Siemens AG made arrangements to weaken the impact of the DGB. The first goal was to reduce the power of the DGB in the supervisory board. The essential execution of this plan started in the 1980s. The Association of Independent Employees (German: Arbeitsgemeinschaft Unabhängiger Betriebsangehöriger, AUB) was founded. As "the other union", the AUB positions itself today deliberately against "traditional unions". Although the AUB has only about 32,000 members, the AUB chairman Schelsky said in 2003: "In ten years, we will be the only competitor in Germany to the DGB." And then his organization was supposed to have stronger political power. After it became public that Siemens had made payments of about 14 million euro to Wilhelm Schelsky, a business consultant and AUB chairman, the offices of Schelsky, Siemens and the AUB were searched by police. On February 14, 2007, Schelsy was arrested on suspicion of offenses in connection with taxes. The payments from Siemens to Schelsky are now estimated to be about 54 million euros. However, direct payments from Siemens to the AUB could not be proven.

=== Loss of Members ===
In the 1990s, the German unions lost many members. In the unions belonging to the DGB, there were about 6.8 million members in 2005. This number corresponded to about 25% of the total number of employees in Germany. According to the DGB, the number of members was 6.4 million in 2007 (including retirees and unemployed). The union density (excluding retirees and unemployed) was 21.3% in 2000.

== Structure ==
Employees' representation in Germany has a dual structure: trade unions that set the framework for working conditions, such as collective wage agreements, for whole sectors or single companies, defining wage levels and working time on the one hand - and works councils ("Betriebsräte") that are elected by employees and represent their interests on plant and company level. They shape and supervise the execution of the frameworks set by trade unions, company policies and negotiate works agreements.

German industrial relations are characterized by a high degree of employee participation up to co-determination in supervisory boards ("Aufsichtsrat"), where trade unionists and works councils elected by employees have full voting rights. Local trade union representatives are democratically elected by union members and formally largely autonomous. Management boards of directors ("Vorstand") are elected by delegates.

== Influence ==
Trade unions in Germany define themselves as being more than a "collective bargaining machine", but as important political players for social, economical and also environmental subjects, especially also for labor market policy and professional education.

== See also ==
- Allgemeiner Deutscher Gewerkschaftsbund, operated 1919–1933
- Christian Trade Union Federation of Germany (CGB) in operation since 1959
- Free Association of German Trade Unions, operated 1897–1919
- German labour law
- German Trade Union Confederation, founded 1949 in West Germany
