= Works Constitution Act =

German works council law

The Works Constitution Act (German: Betriebsverfassungsgesetz, pronounced [bəˈtʁiːpsfɛɐ̯fasʊŋsɡəˌzɛt͡s]), abbreviated BetrVG, is a German federal law governing the rights and duties of a works council.

== History ==
In the Stinnes–Legien Agreement of 1918, during the collapse of the German Empire in the aftermath of World War I, an agreement was reached between trade union confederation leader Carl Legien and industrialist leader Hugo Stinnes, so that capital and labour would cooperate on an equal footing in all aspects of economic management. This was codified in the Weimar Constitution, §165. To implement this principle, in 1920 the legal predecessor Betriebsrätegesetz (Works Councils Act) mandated consultative bodies for workers in businesses with more than 20 employees. All voting rights and work councils were, however, abolished by Hitler in 1933, and replaced with Nazi controlled management bodies.

After World War II and the defeat of fascism, work councils were revived by collective agreements promoted under the Control Council Law No 22 (Kontrollratsgesetz No. 22) of the Allied-occupying forces in 1946. This enabled unions to create work councils with binding participation rights and enforcement of collective agreements.

=== 1952 ratification ===
Subsequently, work council regulation was codified in the Works Constitution Act, passed on 11 October 1952 in West Germany. However, trade unions wanted stronger rights, including the formalisation of works council members as union representatives, and the expansion of the 1951 Coal Codetermination Act for all industries. The Works Constitution Act reserved 1/3rd of Supervisory Board seats for employee representatives, in contrast to the Coal Codetermination Act which reserved 1/2 of the Board for the coal industry. The Conservative government emphasized instead, the legal restrictions on works councils and their formal independence from trade unions.

=== 1972 major reform ===
In 1972 the Works Constitution Act was significantly updated, and largely forms the current basis of the law. It strengthened works council power on the plant level, while subordinating works councils to trade union when it came to collective bargaining.

=== Subsequent reforms ===
The 2001 reform was passed by the SPD-Green cabinet in June 2001. It expands the number of works council members released from work, introduces a simplified election procedure for small workplaces, increased participation rights in environment, anti-racism, retraining, promotion of secure job contracts and more flexibility in setting up alternative works council structures that match modern corporate structures. It expands women participation through gender quotas, new provisions for part-time works council members (many who are women) and acknowledges the tension of work and family life balance.

Twenty years later in 2021, the Betriebsrätemodernisierungsgesetz (Works Council Modernization Act) passed, expanding codetermination rights to include artificial intelligence in the workplace, a new framework for online/hybrid meetings of works council proceedings, expanded simplified election procedure and lowers the voting age to 16 years old.

== Sections of the Act ==
The BetrVG is divided up into 132 different sections (§1 – 132) which are grouped in the following topics.

=== General provisions § 1 – 5 ===
The eligibility criteria for forming works council in large and small establishments, and their relation to trade unions and employer associations.

=== Election procedures § 7 – 20 ===
The works council election procedures, including formation of electoral board, size of works council, voter and candidate eligibility, timelines, gender quota of candidates and contesting elections.

=== Term of office of the works council § 21 – 25 ===
The duration of the works council office, substitute members when a works council member is temporarily or permanently unavailable, termination of membership, both voluntarily and involuntarily.

=== Conduct of business of the works council § 26 – 41 ===
The internal organization of the works council, including its committees, working groups, responsibilities of the chairperson, structure of internal meetings, decision making mechanisms and the honorary nature of the work. Additionally the youth and trainee delegation, disabled person's delegation and trade unions' rights to participate in works council meetings are outlined.

=== Works meeting § 42 – 46 ===
Every 3 months, the works council must organise works meetings for all employees in the workplace, to give updates about their works council activities and also the company performance.

=== Central works council § 47 – 53 ===
When two or more works councils exist at the same company, a central works council must be established.

=== Combine works council § 54 – 59a ===
When two or more subsidiaries of the same corporate group have (central) works council representation, a combine works council can be established.

=== Youth and trainee delegation § 60 – 73b ===
After a works council is formed, if there are youth and trainees in the workplace, the youth and trainee delegation should be established. It represents all workers under the age of 18 and in-plant training employees (trainees, apprentices, working students) below the age of 25.

The delegation is able to attend all internal works council meetings, and even delay voting decisions if the interests of youth and trainees are not taken into account. In companies with a central or combine works councils, a corresponding central or combine youth and trainee delegation can be formed, with similar rights in the respective councils.

=== Collaboration by employees and co-determination – General § 74 – 80 ===
The employer and works council must meet monthly to discuss and negotiate topics relevant to them. In the event, that neither the employer nor the works council are able to conclude a works agreement on matters with binding codetermination, either side can establish a conciliation committee.

Works council members are entitled to any information necessary to carry out their duties. Works council members are eligible to receive business secrets and personal data, so they are bound to secrecy beyond what is expressly permissible to share.

=== Employees’ rights to participate and to make complaints – General § 81 – 86a ===
The rights of individual employees represented by a works council, including complaint procedures. In the most severe cases, if the works council determines the employer did not satisfactorily address an employee complaint, it can establish a conciliation committee.

=== Social matters § 87 – 89 ===
The strongest co-determination rights include the ability to conclude works agreements on 14 different social matters defined in § 87(1).

Voluntary works agreements can also be made on social matters defined in § 88. Unlike § 87, a conciliation committee cannot be called if negotiations fail. Additionally, the works council has the right to be consulted/involved in health and safety inspections.

=== Financial matters § 106 – 113 ===
All financial matters are prescribed in § 106 – 113, which includes the creation of a finance committee, information rights on financial matters, and in the event of significant workplace changes or alterations, such as mass-layoffs, the works council has the right to conclude a social compensation plan for all affected employees.

=== Special regulations for particular types of establishments § 114 – 118 ===
Special provisions regarding formation of works council apply to maritime, aviation and social, charitable, religious organizations.

=== Offences punishable by imprisonment or fines § 119 – 121 ===
Obstruction of a works council or other bodies mentioned is a criminal offense. Similarly, if any members of works council, trade union leak business secrets of the company, that too is a criminal offense. It is a form of protection against union busting.

=== Amendment of other laws § 122 – 124 ===
(obsolete)

=== Transitional and final provisions § 125 – 132 ===
Amendments to existing sections, and also temporary measures are listed here. The election procedures for running a Works Council election are regulated by the Ministry of Labour through modifications to the Election Ordinance according to §126. Expired measures, such as hybrid digital/video meetings during Corona times are mentioned in §129.

== See also ==
- German labour law
- Codetermination Act 1976
