= Mitbestimmungsgesetz =

German law

Mitbestimmungsgesetz 1976 or the Codetermination Act 1976 is a German law that requires companies of over 2000 employees to have half the supervisory board of directors as representatives of workers, and just under half the votes.

== Background ==
From 1922 to 1933, and again from 1951 Germany had had board level codetermination laws, inspired by collective agreements between worker unions and management. The 1919 Weimar Constitution said that, “Workers and employees shall be called upon to cooperate in common with employers, and on an equal footing, in the regulation of salaries and working conditions, as well as in the entire field of the economic development of the forces of production.” The coal and steel industry had required half worker and half shareholder seats on the company supervisory board, but outside these sectors, the Works Constitution Act 1952 merely required one third representation.

By 1976, and given the success of worker participation, the governing social-liberal coalition decided that this should be raised. The 1976 Act was passed on May 4 after long consultations and debates in Parliament (the Bundestag). This law was a political compromise between the Social Democrats and FDP coalition members; it reconciled views of individual employee participation in decision-making with the less conservative view of collective codetermination of labor. The 1976 law applies to all corporations with more than 2,000 employees; a similar law was passed in 1951 but only applied to coal and steel companies. (It remains in force and applies from 1,000 employees on in these branches' companies.)

== Content ==
It applies to all German capital companies, including public companies (Aktiengesellschaft), cooperatives (eingetragene Genossenschaft), private limited companies (Gesellschaft mit beschränkter Haftung) and partnerships (Kommanditgesellschaft auf Aktien) if they have over 2000 employees. Employees and national unions have equal representation on the supervisory board with the stockholders, but the board’s chairman must be a stockholder who has a tie-breaking vote.

The principle is to have almost equal representation between employee representatives and shareholder representatives on the supervisory board (Aufsichtsrat). Germany company law has two levels of boards of directors. The supervisory board then elects a management board which leads the company. The head of the supervisory board is always a shareholder representative who has two votes in case of a deadlock. (Coal and steel industry companies' co-determination goes even further with full parity and a neutral tie-breaking member, instead)

Under the Codetermination Act, the supervisory board must have 12, 16 or 20 members depending on the company's size. Two or three seats will usually be reserved for union representatives. the other seats will be workers, officials and appointees of other interest groups.

Companies with equal representation on their boards must have a dedicated management board position for labor affairs. Codetermination allows employees and not only unions to influence the operations of firms and their surplus.

== Effects ==
While this law was in some ways an extension of the codetermination law of 1951, it differed in key ways. Unlike the 1951 law, however, employees choose their representatives rather than being chosen by the national union; this had the effect of weakening union power. However, employees can use codetermination to protect themselves against wage cuts, layoffs and restructuring, and for this reason, it is believed that wage structure in Germany is remarkably stable.

== Developments ==
Former Chancellor Gerhard Schröder established a Commission on Codetermination (Mitbestimmungskommission), which in 2005, came to no conclusion about possible reforms of the law. Different members disagreed with one side wanting to reduce worker influence and the other side increase it.

== See also ==
- Labour law
- Works council
