= German labour law =

Regulation of employment relationships and industrial partnerships in Germany

German labour law (German: Arbeitsrecht, lit. 'work law') refers to the regulation of employment relationships and industrial partnerships in Germany.

== Timeline ==
- General Commission of German Trade Unions (1892–1919)
- Free Association of German Trade Unions (1897–1919)
- Weimar Constitution 1919
- Betriebsrätegesetz 1920
- Allgemeiner Deutscher Gewerkschaftsbund (1919–1933)
- Free Workers' Union of Germany (1919–1933)
- Arbeitsordnungsgesetz of 1934
- German Labour Front, the nationalised Nazi controlled union (1933–1945)
- Strength Through Joy
- Council of Trust and Factory leader
- Confederation of German Trade Unions (est 1949)
- Mitbestimmungsgesetz 1976

== Court ==
Labour court (German: Arbeitsgericht) has the right to handle legal issues on labours. Federal Labour Court is the highest labour court in Germany.

== Individual labour law ==
=== Contract of employment ===
- Bürgerliches Gesetzbuch (Civil Code) §§ 611–630
- Teilzeit- und Befristungsgesetz (Part-time and Fixed-term Work Act), §14(2) two-year fixed term limit
- Arbeitnehmerüberlassungsgesetz (Employee Leasing Act)
- Urlaubsgesetz (Holidays Act)
- Mutterschutzgesetz
- Arbeitszeitgesetz
- Entgelttransparenzgesetz (Transparency in Wage Structures Act)
- On October 15, 2024, the German Federal Employment Agency (Bundesagentur für Arbeit) updated its interpretations of the Employee Leasing Act (Arbeitnehmerüberlassungsgesetz, or AÜG), with significant implications for EOR services. For the first time, the guidelines extend the licensing requirement under the AÜG to cover virtual employees based abroad but working for German companies.

=== Dismissal ===
- Kündigungsschutzgesetz (Dismissal Protection Act)

== Collective labour law ==
=== Codetermination ===
- Betriebsverfassungsgesetz (Works Constitution Act) requires establishment of Works Councils where there are five or more employees
- Mitbestimmungsgesetz (Codetermination Act)

=== Collective bargaining ===
- Tarifvertragsgesetz (Collective Agreement Act)

== Minimum wage law ==
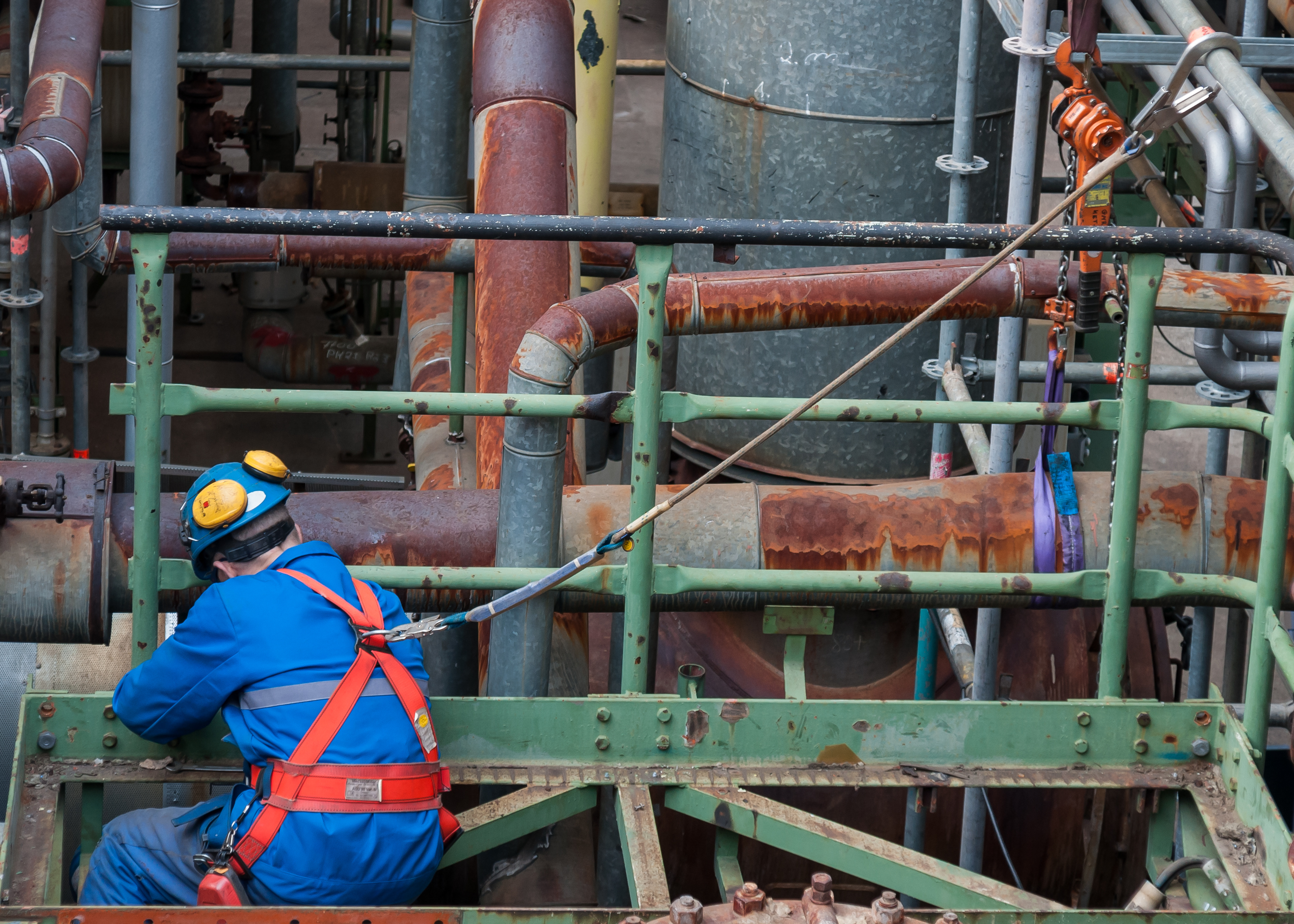
Industrial worker in Cologne, Germany

Minimum wage in Germany is €13.90 per hour, pre-tax since 1 January 2026. The legislation (German: Gesetz zur Regelung eines allgemeinen Mindestlohns) was introduced on 1 January 2015, by Angela Merkel's third government, a coalition between the SPD and the CDU. The implementation of a minimum wage was the SPD's main request during the coalition's negotiations as its central electoral promise during the 2013 federal election campaign. Previously, Germany had minimum wages only in specific sectors, negotiated by trade unions, and some were below the minimum wage level introduced in 2015.

The initial minimum wage was 8.50 euros per hour, pre-tax. Since then, Germany's Minimum Wage Commission (Mindestlohnkommission) regularly proposes adjustments to the minimum wage level. It was last increased to 12 euros per hour pre-tax in October 2022.

Due to inflation, in December 2022 this wage was worth as much as 9.80 euros were worth in January 2015. A €12 wage implies a gross nominal monthly salary of €2,080 for a full-time employee, meaning someone working forty hours per week. The increase to €12 was decided on 3 June 2022 by the Bundestag (400 to 41, with 200 abstentions).

There remain exceptions to the wage minimum for workers on a traineeship, employees during their vocational training, volunteers, internships up to three months, young people and the long-term unemployed.

== See also ==
- German company law
- German contract law
- European labour law
- United Kingdom labour law
