= European Works Council =

European information and consultation bodies

European Works Councils (EWC) are information and consultation bodies representing employees in European multinational companies.

== Purpose ==
The rationale behind the establishment of European Works Councils is related to the economic and political integration of the European Union. As companies became more transnational, the local information and consultation bodies (such as works councils) lacked a direct link to the level on which the real decisions are taken. As EWCs bring employee representatives of all over Europe together with the European management, they have an opportunity to be informed and consulted on the transnational companies strategy and status.

== Legal basis ==
European Works Councils are regulated by two European directives. The first EWC directive was adopted in 1994 (94/45/EC) and a revised directive was adopted in 2009 (2009/38/EC; aka "EWC Recast Directive" and "Transnational Works Council Directive"). These directives are transposed into national legislation in all European Union and European Economic Area countries.

In 2005, the EU Commission issued a draft proposal to update the 1994 Directive, noting particularly that while 820 European Works Councils existed, that represented merely 36% of the enterprises falling within the scope of the directive and around 60% of total employees. It also took the position that works councils as they stood were not 'up to the task of playing their full role in anticipating and managing change and building up a genuine transnational dialogue between management and labour'. The adoption of the 'EWC Recast Directive' came after a long period of discussion on the desirability of giving these councils extra rights and putting an extra burden on companies. In the end, the EWC Recast Directive adopted in 2009 contained some important changes regarding the definitions of information, consultation and transnational issues, included a right to training for employee representative and provided some more requirements for EWC agreements.

== Companies ==
European Works Councils can be established in multinationals operative in more than two EEA countries if they pass a certain threshold of number of employees. Currently, the company (or the group of companies) needs to employ at least 1000 employees in the EEA and at least 150 employees in two member states. If a company passes these thresholds, an initiative can be taken by the employer or the employees to establish a European Works Council.

After such an initiative, a Special Negotiation Body enters into negotiation on the practicalities of the European Works Council: the composition, the competences, the amount of meeting, the need for translation and interpretation in the meetings and much more. This negotiation results in an EWC agreement which forms the basis for all EWC functioning.

== History ==
In 2005, the EU Commission issued a draft proposal to update the 1995 Directive, noting particularly that while 820 European Works Councils existed, that represented merely 36% of the enterprises falling within the scope of the directive and around 60% of employees. It also took the position that works councils as they stood were not 'up to the task of playing their full role in anticipating and managing change and building up a genuine transnational dialogue between management and labour'.

Since the first Directive on European Works Councils was adopted, over 1000 EWCs have been created. According to estimations, they would cover an estimated amount of 19 million employees in the EEA. Most EWCs are established in companies from the metal, chemical and services industries. Geographically, most EWCs are established in companies headquartered in Germany, the US, France and the UK.

According to the EWC Recast Directive, the implementation of the Directive was to be evaluated no later than 5 June 2016. This evaluation was however postponed to the end of 2016 and further postponed to 2017. In the meantime, several evaluation studies have been published from the ETUC, the Leuven University; and the ETUI.

== See also ==
- European company law
- Employee Involvement Directive 2001
