= Federal Labour Court =

Supreme court for labour cases in Germany

Coordinates: 50°58′39″N 11°00′51″E

- Bundesarbeitsgericht

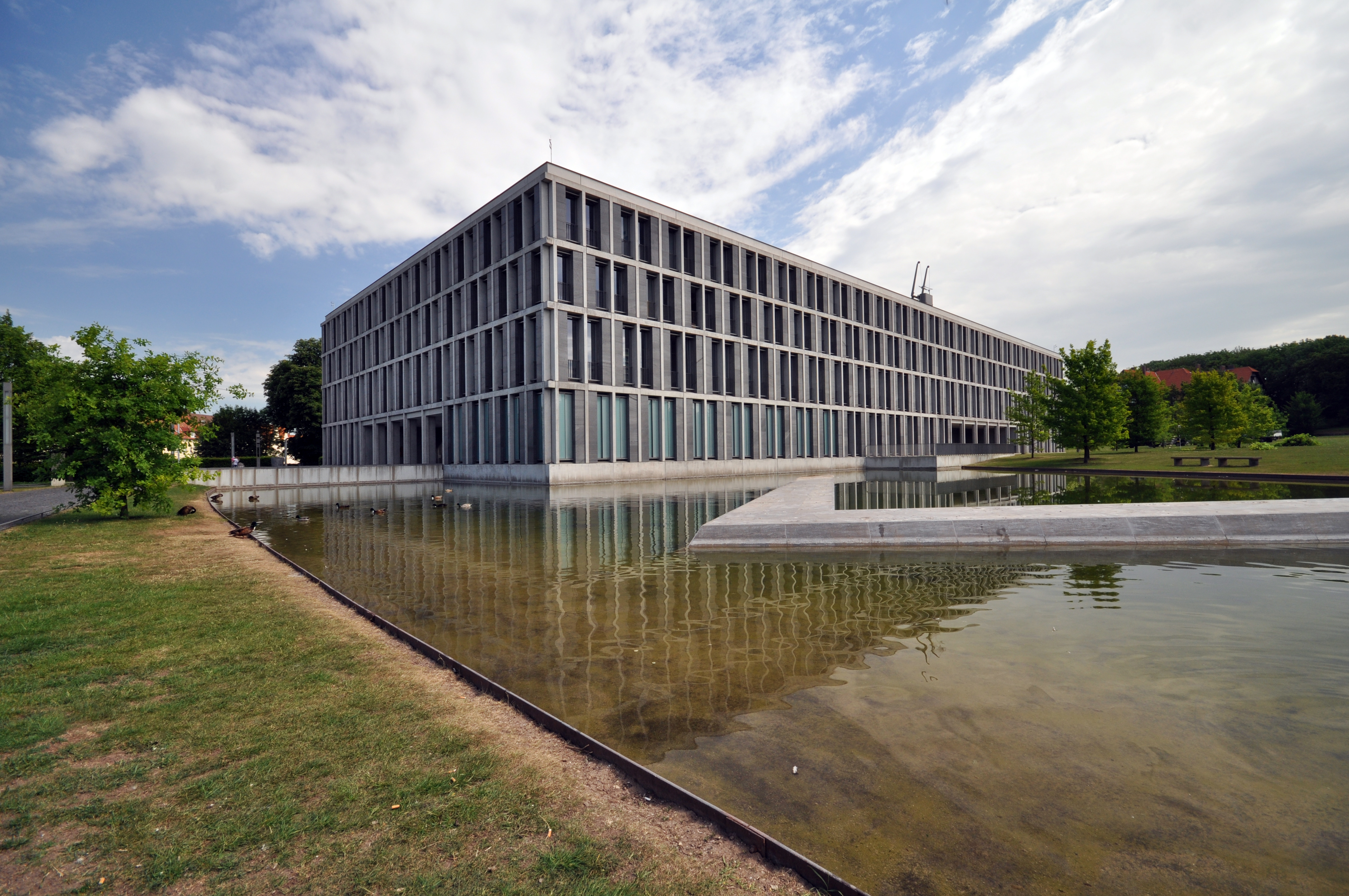
- The court building, opened in 1999
- Established: April 1954
- Jurisdiction: Federal Republic of Germany
- Location: Erfurt, Thuringia
- Authorised by: Basic Law of Germany
- Language: German
- Website: bundesarbeitsgericht.de

President of the Federal Labour Court
- Currently: Inken Gallner

The Federal Labour Court (German: Bundesarbeitsgericht pronounced [bʊndəsˈʔaʁbaɪtsɡəˌʁɪçt], BAG [beːʔaːˈɡeː]) is the court of the last resort for cases of labour law in Germany, both for individual labour law (mostly concerning contracts of employment) and collective labour law (e.g. cases concerning strikes, collective bargaining and works agreements). The court hears cases from the Landesarbeitsgerichte (superior State Labour Courts), which, in turn, are the courts of appeals against decisions of the Arbeitsgerichte (inferior local Labour Courts).

The Bundesarbeitsgericht is located in the city of Erfurt.

== History and seat ==
Labour jurisdiction was not completely separated from ordinary jurisdiction until after World War II. The Basic Law, which came into force in 1949, provided in Article 96 (1), which corresponds in principle to today's Article 95 (1), for labour jurisdiction as an independent branch of the legal system with its own supreme court. This constitutional provision was implemented by the Labour Court Act, which entered into force on October 1, 1953, and established the Federal Labour Court. It began its judicial activities in Kassel in April 1954.

In the course of German unification, the Independent Federalism Commission decided in May 1992 to relocate the Federal Labour Court to Thuringia. In 1993, the state capital of Erfurt was determined to be the future seat of the court. Since the move from Kassel to Erfurt in 1999, the court has been based on the site of the former hornworks of the Petersberg citadel.

Especially since 2020, there has been an increased discussion about the reappraisal of Nazi pasts of former judges and their influence on the jurisprudence of the Federal Labour Court.
