= Central Works Council =

A Central Works Council also called a General Works Council (German: Gesamtbetriebsrat; GBR) must be established in German companies where two or more Works Councils exist within the same legal entity per BetrVG § 47(1). Sections § 47-53 of the Works Constitution Act (BetrVG) pertain to Central Works Councils and their functions.

== Structure ==
As soon as two or more Works Councils exist within the same company (legal entity), a Central Works Council must be formed. By default, each Works Council represented in the Central Works Council may send 1 member if the local Works Council has 3 or fewer members, otherwise they may send 2 members to the Central Works Council per BetrVG § 47(2). The size of the Central Works Council can optionally deviate through a Central Works Agreement and or a collective agreement per BetrVG § 3. In the case of a Central Works Council with over 40 members, a Central Works Agreement between the Central Works Council and the employer is mandatory.

== Competence ==
According to BetrVG § 50, the Central Works Council has "original competence" over issues that affect one or more workplace establishments and or that cannot be solved by a single Works Council. This also includes establishments without a Works Council. Additionally, a local Works Council may refer an issue to the Central Works Council.

The Works Constitution Act specifies that local Works Councils are not subordinate. In practice however, Central Works Councils are increasingly given more responsibility and influence in the workplace. A 2006 survey commissioned by the Economic and Social Research Institute (WSI) of the Hans Boeckler Foundation interviewed members of 2,000 local Works Councils and their corresponding 283 Central Works Councils. The survey responses indicated that Central Works Councils signed Works Agreements more frequently than local Works Councils did in 15 out of 23 categories.

In companies with more than 100 employees, a Works Council appoints members of the Finance Committee. If a Central Works Council exists, they appoint the members of the Finance Committee instead according to § 107(2).

== External ==
- Works Constitution Act legal text (English)
