= Group Works Council =

A Group Works Council also called a Combine Works Council (German: Konzernbetriebsrat; KBR) can optionally be established by any Central Works Council belonging to the corporate group headquartered in Germany according to BetrVG § 54(1). Sections § 54-59a of the Works Constitution Act (BetrVG) directly pertain to Group Works Councils.

== Structure ==
If two or more Central Works Councils exist within the same corporate group that is headquartered in Germany, a Group Works Council can optionally be formed. This is contrasts with Central Works Councils, which are mandatory to establish. One or more Central Works Councils must approve through resolution, the establishment of a Group Works Council. They must represent at least 50% of all employees of the entire group.

Every Central Works Council sends 2 of its members to the Group Works Council per BetrVG § 55(1). The size of the Central Works Council can optionally deviate through a Group Works Agreement and or collective agreement per BetrVG § 3. In the case of 40 plus members, a Group Works Agreement between the Group Works Council and the employer is mandatory.

== Competence ==
According to BetrVG § 58, the Group Works Council has "original competence" over issues that affect two or more subsidiaries cannot be solved by any individual Central Works Councils. This also includes establishments without a central works council. Additionally, a Central Works Council may refer an issue to the Group Works Council.

== External ==
- Works Constitution Act legal text (English)
