= Codetermination in Germany =

Worker board participation in Germany

Codetermination in Germany is a concept that involves the right of workers to participate in management of the companies they work for. Known as Mitbestimmung, the modern law on codetermination is found principally in the Mitbestimmungsgesetz of 1976. The law allows workers to elect representatives (usually trade union representatives) for almost half of the supervisory board of directors. The legislation is separate from the main German company law Act for public companies, the Aktiengesetz. It applies to public and private companies, so long as there are over 2,000 employees. For companies with 500–2,000 employees, one third of the supervisory board must be elected.

There is also legislation in Germany, known as the Betriebsverfassungsgesetz whereby workers are entitled to form Works Councils at the local shop floor level.

== Goals of codetermination ==
Views differ on the goals of codetermination in general. Some social reformers maintain that workers are not merely factory parts, but citizens with equal rights. The Prussian state aimed for a conciliatory policy between capital and labour, and worker committees were one way to involve and bind workers into a system, and avoid conflict. In return unions conceded objectives on the establishment of a socialist state.

Codetermination aims principally to give workers a voice in the company decisions. This means matters on organisation of the business, the conditions of work and the management of personal and economic decisions affecting the future of the company and jobs. Workers therefore choose Works council representatives and members of the supervisory board to represent them.

=== Interests of workers ===
On the assumption that the primary goal of employers is to maximize profits in the interests of shareholders, codetermination can reorient the company's goals in the interests of workers. A better balance may be struck so that the company interests are not so one sided. For trade unions, codetermination is part of democratizing the economy. It is also a way for workers to better the terms and conditions of their contracts in an orderly and regulated way.

=== Interests of employers ===
Much economic discussion mentions the thesis that employers also have an interest in codetermination. Some economists find that it can be an instrument for long term increase in productivity of the company, while others dispute this on the basis that the losses in efficiency in production outweigh any gains in productivity.

== Types of codetermination ==
Several forms of codetermination are distinguished,

=== Operational codetermination ===
Operational codetermination (Betriebliche Mitbestimmung) concerns the organisation of the business, job arrangements, personal planning, guidelines for hiring, social services, time registration and performance assessments. This is found in the Betriebsverfassungsgesetz (BetrVG, Works Constitution Act).

The Betriebsrat or works council is the organ of operational codetermination. In the public sector it is known as the Personalrat or staff council.

=== Corporate codetermination ===
Corporate codetermination (Unternehmensmitbestimmung) concerns private (GmbH) and public limited companies (AktG). The Drittelbeteiligungsgesetz provides for one third of the supervisory board to be elected by workers in companies with more than 500 employees. For companies with more than 2000 employees the Mitbestimmungsgesetz requires half of the Supervisory Board (Aufsichtsrat) to be representative of the workers (subject to the chairman of the board being a shareholder appointee).

In the coal, mining and steel industry the Montan-Mitbestimmungsgesetz allows complete parity between workers and shareholders for companies with over 1000 workers.

In December 2005 there were 729 companies with supervisory boards regulated by the Mitbestimmungsgesetz and around 30 under the Montan-Mitbestimmungsgesetz.

== Historical development ==
- 1848 The Frankfurt Parliament processed a minority proposal for the first codified codetermination that included setting up works councils and 1/3 seats on the supervisory board.
- 1850 The first workers' committees were established in four printing houses in Eilenburg, Saxony.
- 1891 After the repeal of the Sozialistengesetz, workers' committees could be founded freely. However, this happened only where there were active unions.
- 1905 In reaction to a strike in the Ruhr coalmines, the Prussian Berggesetz introduced workers' committees in mining companies with more than 100 workers.
- 1916 The Auxiliary Services Act (1916) (Gesetz des Vaterländischen Hilfsdiensts) created workers' committees for all companies producing for the war effort with more than 50 workers. These committees had the right to be consulted in social affairs.
- 1920 The Betriebsrätegesetz (Works Councils Act) mandated consultative bodies for workers in businesses with more than 20 employees. The social and economic interests of workers were to be represented and considered to the management.
- 1934 After the Nazis seized power, works councils were abolished and unions were broken up.
- 1946/47 The Allied Control Council, through the Kontrollratsgesetz No. 22, allowed works councils as in the Weimar Republic.
- 1951 The Montan-Mitbestimmungsgesetz (Coal, Steel and Mining Codetermination Act) required codetermination in businesses with more than 1,000 employees through workers' representatives making up one half of the supervisory boards.
- 1952 The Betriebsverfassungsgesetz mandated participation of workers at shop floor level through works councils.
- 1955 The Bundespersonalvertretungsgesetz allowed codetermination among members of the civil services in the Federation and the German states.
- 1972 The Betriebsverfassungsgesetz was updated and reissued.
- 1976 The Mitbestimmungsgesetz required codetermination in all companies with more than 2,000 employees.

== Codetermination laws ==
=== Coal and Steel Codetermination Act of 1951 ===
After threats of massive strikes by Metalworker unions, the Montan-Mitbestimmungsgesetz was passed in 1951 in West Germany. It applied to workplaces with over 1,000 employees, which impacted 105 companies at the time. It provided for equal representation on the supervisory board of directors for workers and employers.

On the worker side, representatives are to name an "additional member" who acts explicitly in the interests of the community. The purpose was that in the lead up to World War II, these companies were openly supporting the Nazis financially. To prevent a stalemate on the board, a neutral member is to be appointed, which the parties must agree on. On the management board, one member must be a Staff-director (Arbeitsdirecktor) who cannot be appointed against the votes of the worker directors on the supervisory board.

Companies attempted to avoid the effects of the law after it was passed. The steel company Mannesmann registered another holding company outside the steel industry, intended to evade the law. In response, the Mitbestimmungsergänzungsgesetz (The Codetermination Supplement Act, known as "Lex Mannesmann") was passed to prevent the practice by allowing subsidiary companies to vote for the supervisory board of the parent companies.

=== Works Constitution Act ===
In West Germany, the 1952 Works Constitution Act introduce one third selection of Supervisory Board directors by workers (BetrVG § 76). An exception is made for family companies. For every two shareholder members, the Works Council can send a third worker representative. They may also participate in committees of the Supervisory Board.

On 15 January 1972, the Act of 1952 was largely replaced by the 1972 Act, giving more powers for participation in personal and social affairs of company employees. Individual worker rights were strengthened in relation to trade unions.

=== Codetermination Act of 1976 ===
Mitbestimmungsgesetz 1976 or the Codetermination Act 1976 is a German law that requires companies of over 2000 employees to have half the supervisory board of directors as representatives of workers, and just under half the votes.

=== Third Participation Act 2004 ===
On 18 May 2004 the Drittelbeteiligungsgesetz retired provisions of the 1952 Works Constitution Act, leaving the 1972 Works Constitution Act intact. It applied to workplaces between 500–999 employees who are not already covered under the (Montan-)Mitbestimmungsgesetz and all other workplaces with 500–1999 employees not covered by the broader Mitbestimmungsgesetz (Codetermination Act).

== See also ==
- Co-determination
- Worker representation on corporate boards of directors
- Employee stock ownership
- Worker cooperative
- Market socialism
- Social ownership
- German labour law
