= Hans Böckler =

German politician and trade union leader (1875–1951)

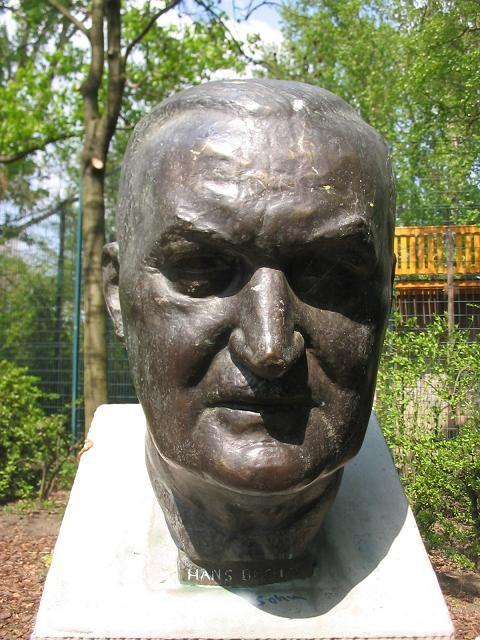
- Memorial bust of Böckler at the Landwehrkanal in Berlin-Kreuzberg
- Born: 26 February 1875; Trautskirchen, Kingdom of Bavaria, German Empire
- Died: 16 February 1951 (aged 75); Düsseldorf, West Germany
- Occupations: Trade unionist; politician

Hans Böckler (26 February 1875 – 16 February 1951) was a German politician and trade union leader. He was the most influential re-founder of the unions in post-war Germany and became the first president of the German Trade Union Confederation.

== Biography ==
Böckler was born on 26 February 1875, in Trautskirchen, near Neustadt an der Aisch, and grew up in a family with limited means. When his father died in 1888, he quit school and worked as an apprentice goldbeater to support his family. In 1894, he joined the Social Democratic Party of Germany (SPD) and the German Metal Workers' Union. (Note: The Deutschen Metallarbeiter-Verband was refounded in 1949 as IG Metall.)

From 1914 to 1915, Böckler fought in World War I. He was badly injured and relieved from military service. He worked for the unions in Danzig, Kattowitz und Siegen until the end the war. From 1924 to 1926, he was an SPD city councilor in Cologne. In 1928, he was elected to the Reichstag where he remained until 1933.

In 1945, Böckler was instrumental in the reorganisation of the unions in the British Zone of Occupation. In April 1947, several unions joined to form the Gewerkschaftsbund in der britischen Besatzungszone and elected him as the president. In 1949, he became the first president of the German Trade Union Confederation.

On 25 January 1951, three weeks before his death, Böckler signed an agreement with German Chancellor Konrad Adenauer to establish full co-determination in the coal and steel industries. Böckler died on 16 February 1951, aged 75, of a heart attack, in Düsseldorf. He was buried in the Melaten-Friedhof in Cologne.

== Works ==
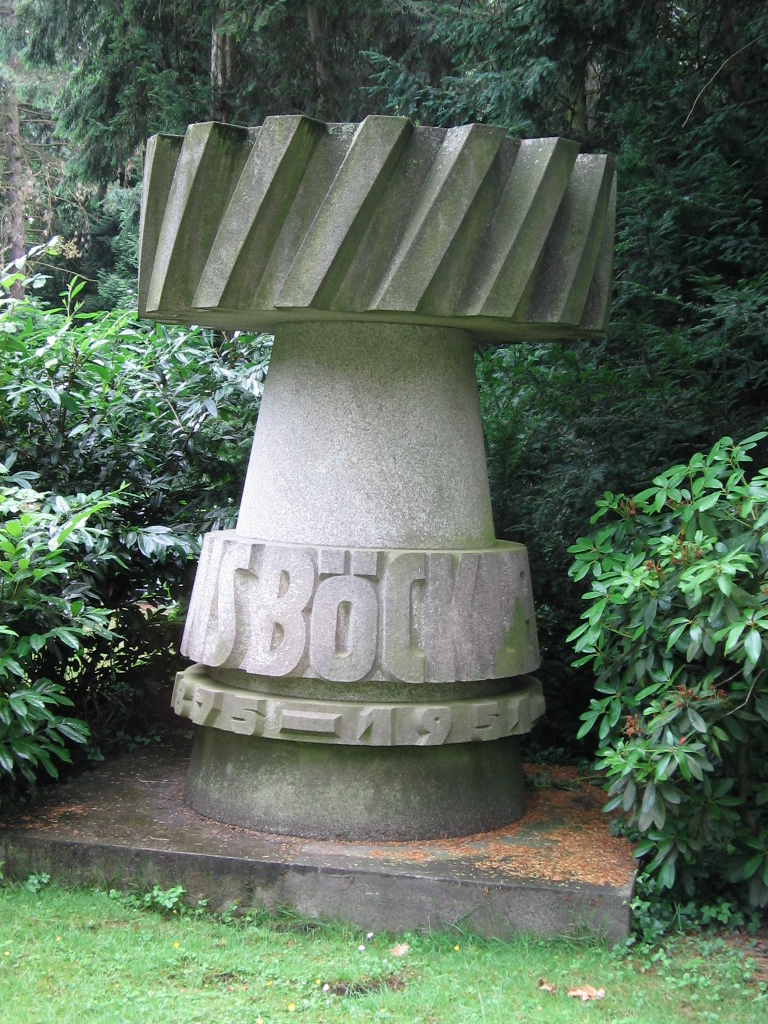
Böckler's grave in the Melaten-Friedhof

- 1906: Es werde Licht! In ernster Zeit – Ein ernstes Wort an die Hüttenleute und Metallarbeiter im Saargebiet – Verlag von J. Böckler, Saarbrücken

== Hans-Böckler-Stiftung ==
The Hans-Böckler-Stiftung (Hans Böckler Foundation) is named in Böckler's honour. It was established by the German Confederation of Trade Unions in 1977 with the merger of the Hans-Böckler-Gesellschaft (Hans Böckler Society) and the Stiftung Mitbestimmung (Co-determination Foundation). In 1995 the Wirtschafts- und Sozialwissenschaftliches Institut (Institute of Economics and Social Sciences) was integrated into the foundation. Based in Düsseldorf, the foundation has several research institutes and publishes a variety of books, journals and working papers. It also provides scholarships and student work placements with funding by the German government.

From 1980 until 2001, the foundation jointly awarded the Hans Böckler Prize with the German Confederation of Trade Unions. The prize was given annually to individuals or organizations for their achievements in improving the working and living conditions of workers and their families and promoting social cohesion and solidarity. The first recipient was Oswald von Nell-Breuning.
