= Works council =

Local/firm-level equivalent of a trade union

A works council is a shop-floor organization representing workers that functions as a local/firm-level complement to trade unions but is independent of these at least in some countries. Works councils exist with different names in a variety of related forms in a number of European countries, including the United Kingdom (Joint Consultative Committee or Employees' Council); Germany and Austria (Betriebsrat, Personalvertretung); Luxembourg (comité mixte, délégation du personnel); the Netherlands (Ondernemingsraad, Personeelsvertegenwoordiging) and Flanders in Belgium (Ondernemingsraad); Italy (comitato aziendale); France (Comité Social et Économique); Wallonia in Belgium (conseil d'entreprise), Spain (comité de empresa) and Denmark (samarbejdsudvalg).

One of the most commonly examined (and arguably most successful) implementations of this institution is found in Germany. The model is basically as follows: general labour agreements are made at the national level by national unions (e.g. IG Metall) and German Employer Associations (e.g. Gesamtmetall), and local plants and firms then meet with works councils to adjust these national agreements to local circumstances. Works council members are elected by the company workforce for a four-year term. They don't have to be union members; works councils can also be formed in companies where neither the employer nor the employees are organized.

Works council representatives may also be appointed to the board of directors.

As with co-determination, there are three main views about why works councils primarily exist: to reduce workplace conflict by improving and systematising communication channels; to increase bargaining power of workers at the expense of owners by means of legislation; and to correct market failures by means of public policy.

== Europe ==
On 22 September 1994, the Council of the European Union passed a Directive (94/45/EC) on the establishment of a European Works Council (EWC) or similar procedure for the purposes of informing and consulting employees in companies which operate at European Union level.

The EWC Directive applies to companies with at least 1,000 employees within the EU and at least 150 employees in each of at least two EEA countries.

European Works Councils were created partly as a response to increased transnational restructuring brought about by the Single European Act. They give representatives of workers from all European countries in big multinational companies a direct line of communication to top management. They also make sure that workers in different countries are all told the same thing at the same time about transnational policies and plans. Lastly, they give workers' representatives in unions and national works councils the opportunity to consult with each other and to develop a common European response to employers' transnational plans, which management must then consider before those plans are implemented.

The EWC Directive was revised by the Council and the European Parliament in May 2009. The changes contained in the new ("Recast") Directive must be transposed into national law by 5 June 2011, and have important implications for all companies in scope of the legislation, both those with an existing European Works Council and those yet to have set one up.

A similar transnational consultative body exists for employees of Societates Europaeae, called SE-Representative-Body or SE Works Council. This went into effect in 2004 with the Employee Involvement Directive (2001/86/EC). SE Works Councils are comparable with European Works Councils according to the European Trade Union Institute.

=== France ===
A comité d'entreprise (C.E. or works council) was mandatory in any company with 50 employees or more. It is being replaced by the comité social et économique (CSE or Business and Social Council) which must have been rolled out in all companies where applicable for 1 January 2020 the latest. Members of the CE are elected by all the employees, and have 20 hours of delegation per month. The main role of the CE or the CSE is being the interface between the employees and the members of the board which is constituted of the chairman and the HR director, mostly for collective issues, such as work organisation, training policy, benefits. Its consultation is compulsory in case of certain economic events, such as any company strategic moves, The number of members depends on the number of people in the company. All members of the CE or CSE have a monthly meeting with the board, in which very specific points are dealt with.

=== Germany ===
Works councils (singular: Betriebsrat, plural: Betriebsräte) in Germany have a long history, with their origins in the early 1920s in the post World War I Weimar Republic, established by the Works Councils Act (Betriebsrätegesetz), later updated in 1952 with the establishment of the Works Constitution Act in West Germany. Initially, unions were very skeptical of works councils, seeing them as a way for management to negotiate with employees without collective bargaining, but eventually they developed clearly defined responsibilities with works councils forbidden from calling for strikes or negotiating wage increase. In recent years with a decline in union membership, works councils have come to be seen as a way for unions to recruit members, specifically by having works councils campaign for people to join them. In 2019, depending on sector, between 16% and 86% of employees worked at an employer with a works council.

While membership in a trade union is explicitly not required, according to the Hans Boeckler Stiftung analysis of year 2014 Works Council elections, depending on sector; between 60 and 80% of Works Councillors elected were members of affiliated trade unions in the German Trade Union Confederation. Unions can offer protections to works council members. For example, unions provide training courses to ensure legally compliant works council elections, which can preempt attacks from management bodies who are hostile to the founding of a works council.

In Germany, they serve two functions. The first is called co-determination, through which works councils elect members of the board of directors of German companies. The second is called participation, and means that works councils must be consulted about specific issues and have the right to make proposals to management. One of the characteristics of works councils is producing harmonious relations between management and workers, leading to a situation with strong unions and a relatively-low strike rates.

Works councils in Germany have been correlated with a number of positive effects. They promote higher wages, even more than collective bargaining does, and workplaces with both works councils and trade unions promote the highest wages. They are also associated with firm productivity, and do not inhibit investment or innovation. Works councils have also been shown to benefit women, East German, and foreign workers. However, they are associated with lower profitability, likely due to higher wages, and they may not be as beneficial in smaller companies as they are in larger ones. Obstructing the works council is a criminal offence.

==== History ====
Workers' rights to codetermine working conditions in Germany began at least as far back as 1850, when four social-liberal entrepreneurs, led by Carl Degenkolb, joined forces in Eilenburg to introduce workers committees to their factories, in part to mitigate worker unrest and inoculate against socialist and union agitation. Statutory workers' committees (Arbeiterausschüsse) were first introduced in Germany in mining companies in Bavaria in 1900 and in Prussia in 1905. The Auxiliary Service Act of 1916, passed during the First World War, provided for the introduction of permanent workers' committees in all companies important to the war economy with at least 50 employees. These workers' committees only had advisory and consultation rights, but they could appeal to an arbitration committee with equal representation and a neutral chairman, to whose decision the employer had to submit.

The current structure and mandate of works councils can be traced to the soviet movement that swept through Europe in the early twentieth century. In Germany, self-governing workers' (Arbeiter-) and soldiers' councils (Soldatenräte) formed in 1918 in the November Revolution. Demands for a soviet-led German republic were eventually neutralized by the Social Democratic Party (SPD), with the Works Constitution Act (Betriebsrätegesetz) of 1920 emerging as a concession to the movement. This Act made works councils compulsory for all companies with over 20 employees. In the Weimar Republic, the ADGB unions discussed expanding the powers of the works councils to include production control in the name of economic democracy, thus initiating socialist transformation. However, this concept failed in the global economic crisis that began in 1929.

The rise of fascism brought a "revised, anti-Marxist version of socialism." The Nazis launched ambitious "corporatist" policies that "rejected class struggle and replaced it with the idea of cooperation between employers and workers." Works councils were banned by the 1934 Work Order Act and replaced by so-called councils of confidence (Vertrauensräte).

With the Allied Control Council Law No. 22 of April 10, 1946, works councils were permitted again in Germany. The first Works Constitution Act (BetrVG 1952) was passed on October 11, 1952. It followed the tradition of the Works Council Act of 1920, whose basic ideas were largely adopted. In 1972, after a controversial social debate, the Works Constitution Act (BetrVG 1972) was fundamentally revised, and it was reformed again in 2001.

Among other things, the working and organizational principles of the works councils were changed. The election procedure was simplified, an "equality quota" (minimum seats for the gender in the minority, see electoral regulations Works Constitution Act § 15 WO) was introduced, the separation between blue-collar and white-collar workers was abolished, the exemption thresholds for works council members were lowered and the works council's involvement in the introduction of group work was made possible, as was the involvement of consultants in the event of operational changes.

=== Netherlands ===
In the Netherlands, all companies with more than 50 employees must establish a works council (ondernemingsraad, abbreviated OR) and companies with between 10 and 49 employees must establish one if requested by a majority of employees or stipulated in a collective agreement. The law requires that ORs are consulted on every "important change" but does not clarify the threshold for what is considered important. Dutch law supplements EU law and updates to the OR regime will be required when Directive (EU) 2025/2450 is updated in 2028/29.

=== United Kingdom ===
UK labour law does not provide for statutory works councils, but some corporations especially in the retail sector have in-house advisory schemes which may be equated to either works councils or company unions; examples include the John Lewis Partnership's PartnerVoice and Marks and Spencer's Business Involvement Group.

== Africa ==
=== Morocco ===
Morocco has a works council system derived from the French one. Because many French corporations have call centres in Morocco, there is interaction with French works councils and trade unions especially in Morocco's telecommunications sector. In November 2014 the UMT affiliate in the sector, FNCAMO, decided to contest the June 2015 national works council elections. They coordinated with the French CGT and union activists organised direct action protests and social events to campaign among workers. Activity was focused in 14 larger companies. FNCAMO won 24,000 votes and more than 120 seats across the telecommunications sector, becoming the largest bloc and the only trade union force in the sector, while 6195 UMT candidates were elected across all works councils in Morocco. FNCAMO successfully won union recognition in the 14 target companies, but failed to consolidate its gains and many militant workers were "isolated and weeded out" in the following two years.

== See also ==
- Co-determination
- Joint industrial council
- Workers' council
