= European organisational law =

Aspect of EU law

European organisational law is a part of European Union law, which concerns the formation, operation and insolvency of public bodies, partnerships, corporations and foundations in the entire European Union. There is no substantive European company law as such, although a host of minimum standards are applicable to companies throughout the European Union. All member states continue to operate separate companies acts, which are amended from time to time to comply with EU Directives and Regulations. There is, however, also the option of businesses to incorporate as a Societas Europaea (SE), which allows a company to operate across all member states.

== History ==
There have been, since the European Community was founded in 1957, a series of directives creating minimum standards for business across the European Union. A central aim restated in each Directive is to reduce the barriers to freedom of establishment of businesses in the European Union through a process of harmonising the basic laws. The object is that when laws are harmonised, business will not be deterred by different or more onerous laws, but at the same time harmonisation provides a basic level of protection for investors in each member state, none of which are forced into regulatory competition.

== Types ==
=== Existing ===
Except for the EEIG which is an unlimited partnership, all of the following types have full EU/EEA-wide juridical personality.

Name (in Latin)	Abbrev.	English translation	Established as a legal form	Number of registrations (2014)	Comment
N/A	EEIG	European economic interest grouping	1985	several thousand	e.g. ARTE
Societas Europaea	SE	European company	2004	2423	
Societas cooperativa Europaea	SCE	European cooperative society	2006		
N/A	EGTC	European grouping of territorial cooperation	2006	78	
N/A	ERIC	European Research Infrastructure Consortium	2009	22	
N/A	Europarty	European political party	2014	10	defined already in 2003, but a legal form in its own right only since 2014
N/A	Eurofoundation	European political foundation	2014	9	defined already in 2007, but a legal form in its own right only since 2014

=== Proposed ===
Name (in Latin)	Abbrev.	English translation	Comment
Societas privata Europaea	SPE	European private company	proposal withdrawn, foreseen alternative: SUP
Societas unius personae	SUP	Sole proprietorship	
Fundatio Europaea	FE	European foundation	
N/A	ME	European mutual society	
Association Europaea	AE	European association	

== European treaties ==
- Gebhard v Consiglio dell'Ordine degli Avvocati e Procuratori di Milano [1995] ECR I-4165 (C-55/94)
- Centros Ltd v Erhversus-og Selkabssyrelsen [1999] ECR I-1459 (C-212/97)
- Überseering BV v Nordic Construction Company Baumanagement GmbH (C-208/00)
- Kamer van Koophandel en Fabrieken voor Amsterdam v Inspire Art Ltd [2003] ECR I-10155 (C-167/01)

== Harmonised fields of national law ==
=== Formations and civil law ===
- First Company Law Directive 68/151/EEC, on co-ordination of safeguards (...) for the protection of the interests of members and others, repealed by 2009/101/EC. This concerns company registrations, transactional validity, the effect of ultra vires transactions, or transactions by improperly incorporated businesses. Now replaced by Directive 2017/1132
- Eleventh Company Law Directive 89/666/EEC, on disclosure requirements in respect of branches opened in a Member State by certain types of company governed by the law of another State
- Twelfth Company Law Directive 89/667/EEC, on single-member private limited-liability companies, repealed by 2009/102/EC
- Draft Fourteenth Company Law Directive, on cross-border transfer of the registered offices of limited liability companies

=== Corporate governance ===
- Shareholder Rights Directive 2007/36/EC, on the exercise of certain rights of shareholders in listed companies
- Draft Fifth Company Law Directive, on the structure of public companies, shareholder rights to determine director pay and codetermination
- Draft Ninth Company Law Directive, on corporate groups

=== Capital maintenance ===
- Second Company Law Directive 77/91/EEC, on formation of public companies and the maintenance and alteration of capital, updated by 2006/68/EC and 2009/109/EC, repealed by 2012/30/EU

=== Mergers and acquisitions ===
- Third Company Law Directive 78/855/EEC, on mergers of public limited liability companies, repealed by 2011/35/EU
- Sixth Company Law Directive 82/891/EEC, on division of public companies, amended by 2007/63/EC
- Tenth Company Law Directive 2005/56/EC, on cross-border mergers of limited liability companies
- Thirteenth Company Law Directive 2004/25/EC, on takeover bids
- Merger Tax Directive 90/434/EEC, on the common system of taxation applicable to mergers, divisions, transfers of assets and exchanges of shares concerning companies of different Member States, repealed by 2009/133/EC

=== Accounting and audit ===
- Fourth Company Law Directive 78/660/EEC, on accounting standards, repealed by the EU Accounting Directive 2013/34/EU
- Seventh Company Law Directive 83/349/EEC, on group accounts, repealed by the EU Accounting Directive 2013/34/EU
- Eighth Company Law Directive 84/253/EEC, on the approval of persons responsible for carrying out the statutory audits of accounting document, repealed by 2006/43/EC, on statutory audits of annual accounts and consolidated accounts

=== Market regulation ===
- Market Abuse Directive 2003/6/EC
- Transparency of Listed Companies Directive 2004/109/EC

== See also ==
- UK company law
- European Union shipping law
- German company law
- US corporate law
- List of company registers
- Swiss referendum "against corporate Rip-offs" of 2013
