= Workplace participation in the United Kingdom =

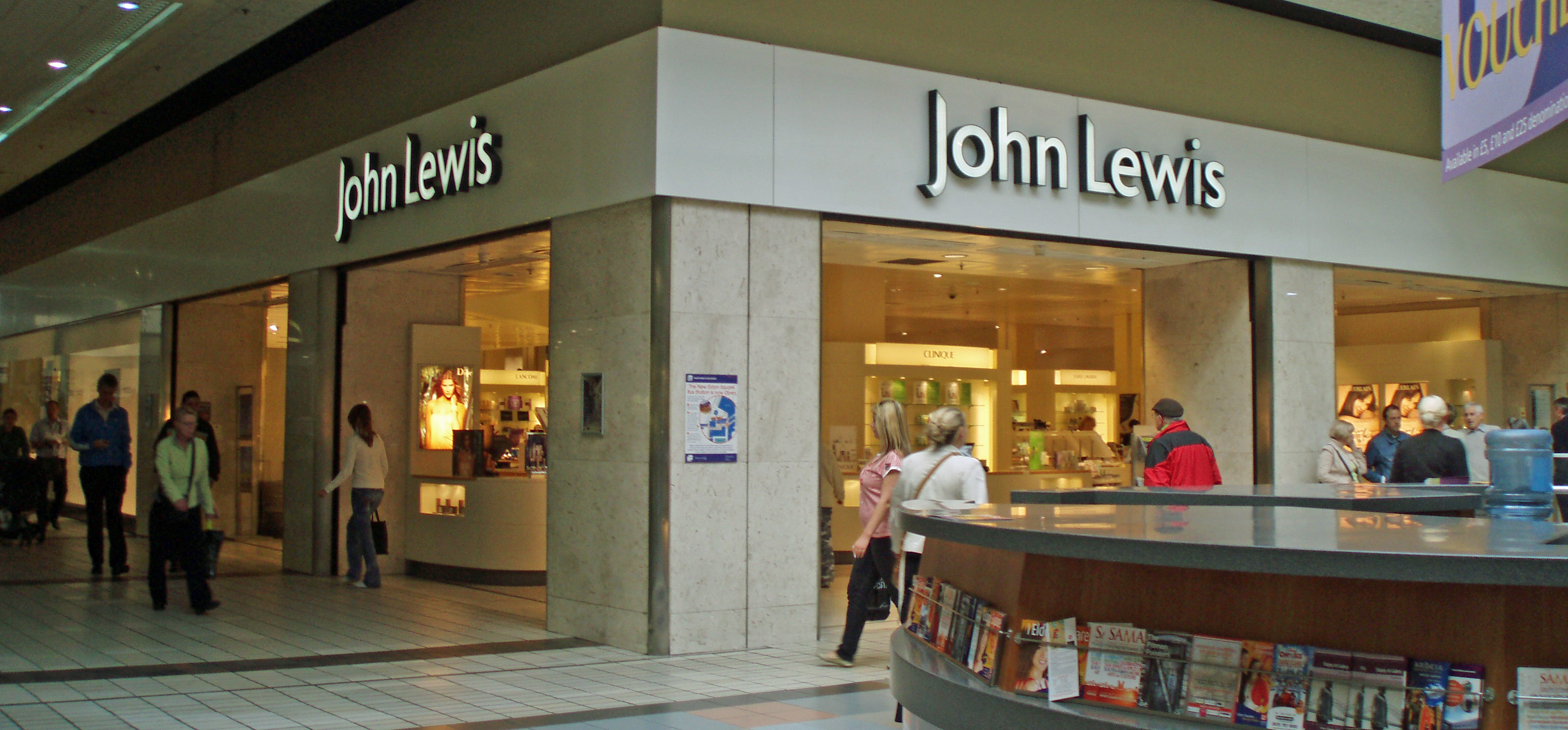
The UK has not yet implemented proposals to allow worker participation in companies, as seen in successful cooperatives like John Lewis.

Workplace participation in the United Kingdom refers to the structures that people at work have to participate in the way their organisation is managed. UK labour and company law generally leaves this up to the management of the company, appointed by shareholders and banks, to determine, and in contrast to most European jurisdictions requires only a minimum participation practices. Workers have the right to,

- organise a works council which must be informed and consulted on major business changes, particularly redundancies
- organise a health and safety committee, with the right to input on workplace health and safety practices

Otherwise UK workers participate outside a firm's own structure through self-organisation of trade unions, which can pressure management to enter into a collective agreement through the threat of industrial action. Businesses are free in UK law to voluntarily grant employees participation rights, or to reach a collective agreement with the trade union, to be members in the general meeting, or the right to elect specific board members, though orthodox companies do not do this.

== History ==
In the 1977 Report of the committee of inquiry on industrial democracy the Government proposed, in line with developments in Germany, and mirroring an EU Draft Fifth Company Law Directive, that the board of directors should have an equal number of representatives elected by employees as there were for shareholders. However the only reform introduced after the 1979 election was that directors owed a duty to act in shareholders' and employees' interests alike.

== Workplace participation ==
New workplace participation practices have been emerging for larger companies, mostly through initiatives led by the European Union, supported by the British Government.

=== Information and consultation ===
Under the Information and Consultation of Employees Regulations 2004, companies with more than fifty employees must inform their workforce about major economic issues in their enterprise, and should consult about major changes, particularly redundancies.

=== Cross border companies ===
Under the Transnational Information and Consultation of Employees Regulations 1999, companies with over 1000 employees in more than one EU member state establish works councils to consult through the course of business. But beyond this model of encouraging "dialogue" the channels for employee participation in companies are limited to traditional systems of trade union collective bargaining and, as a final resort, industrial action or strikes.

=== Health and safety ===
- Health and Safety at Work etc. Act 1974

== European Company ==
Though no UK company appears yet to have chosen this route, businesses reincorporating under the European Company Statute may opt to follow the Directive for employee involvement. A Societas Europaea may adopt either a two or one-tier board structure. Where the board is two-tiered, as in German companies, shareholders and employees (in proportion no less than what existed for most employees in their home countries previously) elect a supervisory board that in turn appoints a management board responsible for day to day running of the company. An SE may also choose a one tiered board, the same as every company in the UK chooses, and employees and shareholders may elect board members in the desired proportion.

== Worker cooperatives ==
The exceptions to lack of worker participation are entities like the John Lewis partnership that are wholly managed and owned by the workforce.

== Employee share schemes ==
Some companies take advantage of tax breaks to implement employee share schemes, however this typically makes employees ordinary shareholders but at the cost of heavily under-diversifying risk.

== See also ==
- UK labour law
- UK company law
- Shareholder Rights Directive
