= Second Company Law Directive =

The Second Company Law Directive 2012/30/EU (sometimes also called the "Capital Directive") is a European Union Directive concerning the capital requirements of public companies that operating within the European Union. A number of its provisions have become increasingly controversial since its enactment in 1976, as many rules for the maintenance and alteration of capital have been abandoned within EU member states, particularly regarding the use of minimum capital (currently set at €25,000), and the accounting concept of nominal share value. Nevertheless, a large number of its rules are still seen as essential for the protection of creditors, to attempt to forestall insolvency.

== Contents ==
- art 1, application to public limited companies, but investment companies and cooperatives can be completely exempted
- art 2, information must be publicised when a company is incorporated on its name, objects, capital subscriptions, and governance rules
- art 3, information to go to the registrar
- art 4, liability rules for people who begin companies without proper registration
- art 5, companies with one person should not be automatically abolished
- art 6, minimum capital of €25,000 for public companies, revisable every five years
- art 7, an undertaking to do work cannot be part of a company's subscribed capital
- art 8, no issue of shares at a discount on nominal value
- art 9, shares should be paid up to at least 25% of their nominal value
- arts 10–13, if shares are bought with assets, rather than cash, they must be independently valued
- art 17, distributions below subscribed capital not allowed
- art 18, shareholders must return money if the must have known of an infringement
- art 19, a meeting must be called if there is a serious capital loss
- art 20, companies cannot subscribe for their own shares
- arts 21–22, companies can buy back their own shares so long as shareholders are treated equally, and subject to a series of other conditions
- arts 23–24, also buy backs
- art 25, financial assistance for share purchase
- art 26, ensure no conflicts of interest for related party transactions
- art 28, if a public company's subsidiary, which is under a dominant influence, buys shares then the public company itself is regarded as buying the shares. Defines the concept of dominant influence.
- arts 29–33, increases in capital, rights of pre-emption
- arts 34–42, reductions in capital
- art 43, redeemable shares, conditions attached
- art 45(1) member states can derogate from the "first paragraph of Article 9, the first sentence of point (a) of Article 21(1) and Articles 29, 30 and 33 to the extent that such derogations are necessary for the adoption or application of provisions designed to encourage the participation of employees". (2) "Member States may decide not to apply the first sentence of point (a) of Article 21(1) and Articles 34, 35, 40, 41, 42 and 43 to companies incorporated under a special law which issue both capital shares and workers' shares, the latter being issued to the company's employees as a body, who are represented at general meetings of shareholders by delegates having the right to vote."
- art 46, principle of equal treatment of shareholders
- arts 47–50, final transitional and temporal provisions

== Court of Justice decisions ==
The Directives provisions on freedom of establishment had determined that minimum capital was a disproportionate means to achieve the aim of protecting creditors. These decisions have only been made in relation to national laws regarding private companies, and not yet the EU Directive itself. It is unclear to what extent it would be regarded as compatible with the TFEU.

- Gebhard v Consiglio dell'Ordine degli Avvocati e Procuratori di Milano [1995] ECR I-4165 (C-55/94)
- Centros Ltd v Erhversus-og Selkabssyrelsen [1999] ECR I-1459 (C-212/97)
- Überseering BV v Nordic Construction Company Baumanagement GmbH (C-208/00)
- Kamer van Koophandel en Fabrieken voor Amsterdam v Inspire Art Ltd [2003] ECR I-10155 (C-167/01)

== See also ==
- EU company law
- UK company law
- German company law
