= Worker representation on corporate boards of directors =

Aspect of corporate law

Worker representation on corporate boards of directors, also known as board-level employee representation (BLER), refers to the right of workers to vote for representatives on a board of directors in corporate law. In 2018, a majority of Organisation for Economic Co-operation and Development, and a majority of countries in the European Union, had some form of law guaranteeing the right of workers to vote for board representation. Together with a right to elect work councils, this is often called codetermination.

The first laws requiring worker voting rights include the Oxford University Act 1854 and the Port of London Act 1908 in the United Kingdom, the Act on Manufacturing Companies of 1919 in Massachusetts in the United States (although the act's provisions were completely voluntary), and the Supervisory Board Act 1922 (Aufsichtsratgesetz 1922) in Germany, which codified collective agreement from 1918 and expanded it in the 1976 Mitbestimmungsgesetz.

== Overview ==
There are three main views as to why codetermination exists: to reduce management-labour conflict by improving and systematizing communication channels; to increase bargaining power of workers at the expense of owners by means of legislation; and to correct market failures by means of public policy. The evidence on "efficiency" is mixed, with codetermination having either no effect or a positive but generally small effect on enterprise performance.

== By country ==
The following is a list of 35 countries in the Organisation for Economic Co-operation and Development and their practices of worker representation on corporate boards of directors.

Country	Law	Minimum worker representation	Minimum number of employees at which law applies	Notes
Austria (private companies)	Labour Constitution Act 1975	33.3%	300	One-third of the supervisory board from 300 employees in private companies; no employee threshold for public limited companies.
Austria (public limited companies)	Labour Constitution Act 1975	33.3%	0	One-third of the supervisory board from 300 employees in private companies; no employee threshold for public limited companies.
Belgium			N/A	No general law, but some public companies have employee representatives.
Bulgaria		0%	N/A	No general law, but employees have rights to speak at shareholder general meetings.
Croatia (limited companies)	LL 2009 art 166	"One"	300	Employee representative on the supervisory board if the company has over 300 employees (limited companies); no employee threshold for public limited companies
Croatia (public limited companies)	LL 2009 art 166	"One"	0	Employee representative on the supervisory board if the company has over 300 employees (limited companies); no employee threshold for public limited companies
Cyprus		0%	N/A	No general law
Czech Republic (private companies)		0%	N/A	No general law. Before 2014, private companies over 50 employees had one-third employee representation.
Czech Republic (state-owned companies)		33.3% (may be increased up to 50% voluntarily)	1	
Denmark	Companies Act 2010 s 140	≤33.3% (two members minimum)	35	At least two members of the board, up to one-third of the board's membership.
Estonia		0%	N/A	No general law
Finland	Co-operation Act 2021 s 31	20%	150	From 150 employees, there must be an agreement on employee representation. If there is none, employee representation automatically defaults to one-fifth of board members.
France (private companies)	Commercial Code Art. L. 225-79	"One" or "Two"	1000 (or 5000 worldwide)	Private companies over 1000 employees in France or 5000 worldwide must have at least one or two board members.
France (state-owned companies)	Commercial Code Art. L. 225-79	33.3%	1	Private companies over 1000 employees in France or 5000 worldwide must have at least one or two board members.
Germany	Drittelbeteiligungsgesetz 2003 (One-third Participation Act 2004), Mitbestimmungsgesetz 1976 (Codetermination Act 1976), Montanmitbestimmungsgesetz 1951 (Coal and Steel Codetermination Act 1951)	33.3%	500	Enterprises with over 500 employees must have one-third representation on a supervisory board.
Germany	Drittelbeteiligungsgesetz 2003 (One-third Participation Act 2004), Mitbestimmungsgesetz 1976 (Codetermination Act 1976), Montanmitbestimmungsgesetz 1951 (Coal and Steel Codetermination Act 1951)	50%	2000	Enterprises with over 2000 employees must have one-half representation on a supervisory board, but the chair of the supervisory board is a shareholder representative and has a casting vote. In coal and steel companies shareholder representatives do not have a deciding vote.
Greece (private companies)		0%	N/A	No general law
Greece (state-owned companies)		"One"	1	
Hungary		33.3%	200	From 200 employees, one-third of supervisory board members are employees.
Ireland (state-owned companies)	Workers Participation (State Enterprises) Act, 1977	33.3%	1	
Italy		0%	N/A	No general law
Latvia		0%	N/A	No general law
Lithuania		0%	N/A	No general law
Luxembourg (private companies)		≤33.3%	≤1000	A third of the board in companies with 1,000 or more employees, up to a third in others
Luxembourg (private companies)		33.3%	1000	A third of the board in companies with 1,000 or more employees, up to a third in others
Luxembourg (state-owned companies)		33.3%	1	
Malta		0%	N/A	No general law
Malta		?	1	For companies owned by unions or the Labour Party.
Netherlands	Works Constitution Act 1971, amended in 2004	≤33.3%	100	
Norway	Limited Liability Companies Act 1973	"One"	30-50	One director in companies with 30 to 50 employees; one-third of the seats in companies with more than 50, with the possibility of an extra seat in companies with more than 200
Norway	Limited Liability Companies Act 1973	33.3%	51-200	One director in companies with 30 to 50 employees; one-third of the seats in companies with more than 50, with the possibility of an extra seat in companies with more than 200
Norway	Limited Liability Companies Act 1973	33.3%+1	201	One director in companies with 30 to 50 employees; one-third of the seats in companies with more than 50, with the possibility of an extra seat in companies with more than 200
Poland (private companies)	Law on Workers’ Self Management of 1981	0%		No general law
Poland (state-owned companies)	Law on Workers’ Self Management of 1981	33.3%	1	In state-owned companies employees have one-third of supervisory board seats, and a seat on the management board.
Portugal	1976 Constitution, Arts. 30 and 33 and Law 46/79			No co-determination, but, in state owned companies, workers have a right to be consulted. In private companies work councils may elect representatives, but the number is determined by the employer.
Romania		0%	N/A	No general law, but unions can be heard at meetings.
Slovakia (private companies)	Labour Code (Law 311/2001), Art. 233-236	33.3% (may be increased up to 50% voluntarily)	50	
Slovakia (state-owned companies)		50%	1	Half the supervisory board in state-owned companies.
Slovenia	1991 Constitution art 75, and 1993 law.	50% - 33.3%	50	Between a third and a half of seats in companies with supervisory board plus management board member if more than 500 employees; around a third in companies with single tier board
Spain	Law 41/1962, repealed 1980	0%	N/A	Some state-owned companies retain two board members though it has not been compulsory since 1980 to have employee representation in private companies.
Sweden	Board Representation (Private Sector Employees) Act (1987:1245)	33.3%	25	Over 25 employees, around one-third representation on boards.
Switzerland		0%	N/A	Representation in postal services. No general law, but there was employee representation in railways.
United Kingdom	Cambridge University Act 1856, Higher Education Governance (Scotland) Act 2016, Education Act 2002 s 19, National Health Service Act 2006 etc.	0%	N/A	No general law, although staff participation required in universities, schools, and in NHS foundation trusts. The Financial Reporting Council has a comply or explain rules for employee representation in the UK Corporate Governance Code
Australia		0%	N/A	No general law
Canada		0%	N/A	No general law
New Zealand		0%	N/A	No general law
United States		0%	N/A	No general law, although in Massachusetts manufacturing firms may voluntarily have employees on boards. Any collective agreement can achieve the same result.
Chile		0%	N/A	No general law
Israel (private companies)		0%	N/A	No general law
Israel (state-owned companies)	1977 Law and a 1985 High Court decision, Dapey Shituf (Tel-Aviv 1985)	?	1	Worker representation in government companies
Japan		0%	N/A	No general law
South Korea		0%	N/A	No general law
Turkey		0%	N/A	No general law

=== Canada ===
During the 2021 federal election, Conservative Party leader Erin O'Toole pledged to require that federally regulated employers with over 1,000 employees or $100 million in annual revenue include worker representation on their boards of directors should he be elected Prime Minister.

=== China ===
In China, during the late twentieth century, worker representation on corporate boards of directors was mandated by law for state-owned enterprises and permitted in non-state-owned collectives and companies via "Staff and Worker Representative Congresses" (SWRCs), composed of workers directly elected by all workers in the workplace to represent them. As of the 1980s and 1990s, SWRCs were, in principle, broadly similar to continental European and Japanese workers' workplace councils in terms of rights and powers and consensus building. Research based on interviews in 1997 suggested that in practice, SWRCs did have some real power, including some cases of dismissing managers.

=== Germany ===
The first codetermination plans began at companies and through collective agreements. Prior to 1976, German coal and steel producers employing more than 1,000 workers already commonly maintained a board of directors composed of 11 members: five directors came from management, five were workers' representatives, with the eleventh member being neutral. (Note: Boards could be larger as long as the proportion of representation was maintained.) In 1976, the law's scope was expanded to cover all firms employing more than 2,000 workers; with some changes concerning to the board structure, which has an equal number of management and worker representatives, with no neutral members (except in the Mining-and-steel industries where the old law remained in force). The new board's head would represent the firm's owners and had the right to cast the deciding vote in instances of stalemate. (The original law comprising coal-and-steel industries thus remained unchanged in force)

=== New Zealand ===
The Companies Empowering Act 1924 allowed companies to issue shares for labour and have them represented by directors, but it was little used, even its chief promoter, Henry Valder, being unable to get his company board to agree to it. It was consolidated into the Companies Act in 1933. The Law Commission recommended its abolition in 1988 for lack of use. The Companies Act 1993 did not allow for labour shares.

=== United Kingdom ===
In the UK, the earliest examples of codetermination in management were codified into the Oxford University Act 1854 and the Cambridge University Act 1856. In private enterprise, the Port of London Act 1908 was introduced under Winston Churchill's Board of Trade.

While most enterprises in the UK do not have worker representation, universities there have done so since the 19th century. Generally the more successful the university, the more staff representation on governing bodies: Cambridge, Oxford, Edinburgh, Glasgow and other Scottish universities.

=== United States ===
Massachusetts has one of the world's oldest codetermination laws that has been continually in force since 1919, although it is voluntary and only for manufacturing companies.

== Impact ==
A 2020 study in the Quarterly Journal of Economics found that codetermination in Germany had no impact on wages, the wage structure, the labor share, revenue, employment or profitability of the firm, but it increased capital investment.

A 2021 study by the Bureau of Economic Research found that "the European model of codetermination is neither a panacea for all of the problems faced by 21st-century workers, nor a destructive institution that is dramatically inferior to shareholder primacy. Rather, as currently implemented, it is a moderate institution with, on net, nonexistent or small positive effects. Board-level and shop-floor worker representation cause at most small increases in wages, possibly lead to slight increases in job security and satisfaction, and have largely zero or small positive effects on firm performance."

== History ==
Some of the first codetermination laws emerged in universities in the UK during the 19th century, such as the Oxford University Act 1854 and the Cambridge University Act 1856. Further acts included the South Metropolitan Gas Act 1896 (59 & 60 Vict. c. ccxxvi) and the Port of London Act 1908. In Germany, there were experiments with worker representation through work councils over the late 19th century, after the first attempts to introduce worker voice by an ex-member of the Frankfurt Parliament named Carl Degenkolb. At the end of World War I, the German trade unions made an historic collective agreement with representatives of German business for full partnership in economic management throughout the country. This was put into the Weimar Constitution article 165, and resulted in a work council law in 1920, and a board representation law in 1922. The fascist government abolished codetermination in 1934, but after World War II, German unions again made collective agreements to resurrect work councils and board representation. These agreements were codified in law in 1951 and 1952.

In most countries around Europe, different forms board representation law spread slowly, especially from the 1970s. In the UK there were repeated experiments from iron and steel to the post office, with worker directors. However, after the Bullock Report of 1977 failed to pass and Margaret Thatcher won the 1979 election, almost all worker participation was ended. Germany recast and extended its laws in 1972 and 1976. The European Commission did propose a Draft Fifth Company Law Directive, but it did not complete passage. In the United States, growing interest in worker "involvement" through Scanlon plans led to unions such as the United Steelworkers at Chrysler, or at United Airlines to negotiate board representation, although usually this was forcibly linked to employee share schemes. Notably, the share scheme at Enron failed in 2003. Almost all modern worker representation laws enable votes without any requirement to invest money. In 2013, France became the largest country to create a modern board representation law to mandate workers with equal rights to all other directors to be on boards.

== See also ==
- Codetermination in Germany
- Cooperative
  - Worker cooperative
- Corporatism
- Employee stock ownership
- Joint industrial council
- Labour law
  - European labour law and European company law
  - UK labour law and UK company law
  - German labour law
  - French labour law
  - Indian labour law
  - US labor law and US corporate law
- Labor union
- Market socialism
- Paritarian Institutions
- Polder model
- Social Partnership
- Social ownership
- Works council
- Workers' council
- Workplace democracy
