= SUP =

Sup or SUP may refer to:

- Samoa Uniting Party
- Saskatchewan United Party, a political party in Saskatchewan
- Supremum or sup, in mathematics, the least upper bound
- Societas unius personae, proposed EU type of single-person company
- SUP Media or Sup Fabrik, a Russian internet company
- Sailors' Union of the Pacific
- Scottish Unionist Party (1986), established in the mid-1980s
- Simple Update Protocol, dropped proposal to speed RSS and Atom
- Singapore United Party, a Singaporean political party
- Software Upgrade Protocol
- Standup paddleboarding
- Stanford University Press
- Sydney University Press
- Syracuse University Press
- Sup squark, the supersymmetric partner of the up quark
- <sup>, an HTML tag for superscript
- Supangle or sup, a Turkish dessert

== See also ==
- Socialist Unity Party (disambiguation)
- Syriac Union Party (disambiguation)
- Supper, a meal that is consumed before bed
- Super (disambiguation)
- What's Up (disambiguation)
