= Commission v Germany (C-112/05) =

EU law case

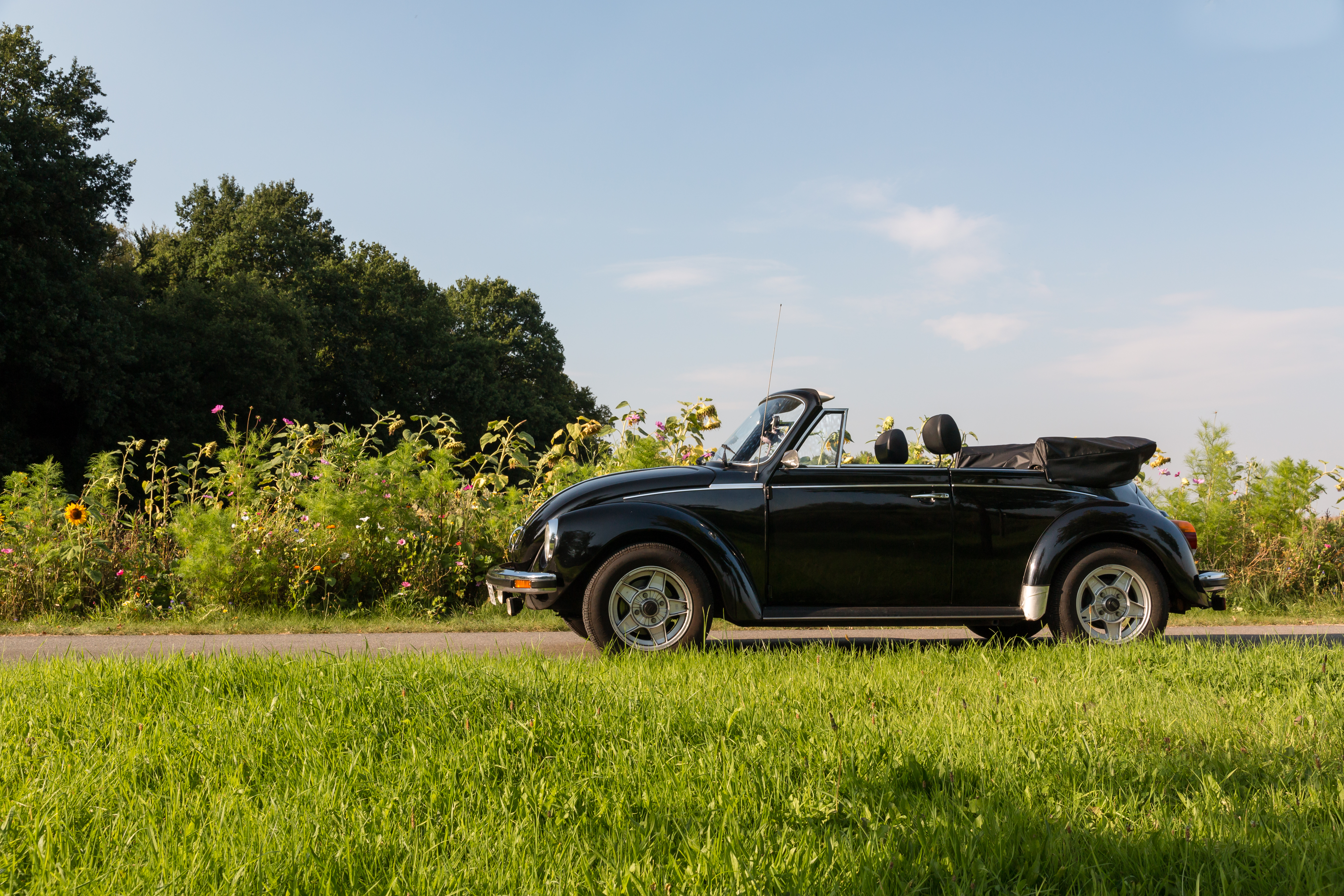
- Volkswagen car
- Court: Court of Justice of the European Union
- Citation: (2007) C-112/05

Keywords
- Golden shares, corporate power

Commission v Germany (2007) C-112/05 is an EU law case, relevant for UK enterprise law, concerning European company law. Following a trend in cases such as Commission v United Kingdom, and Commission v Netherlands, it struck down public oversight, through golden shares of Volkswagen by the German state of Lower Saxony. Soon afterwards, the management practices leading to the Volkswagen emissions scandal began.

== Facts ==
The Commission claimed that the Volkswagen Act 1960 provisions on golden shares violated free movement of capital under the Treaty on the Functioning of the European Union article 63. The VA 1960 §2(1) restricted the number of shareholder voting rights to 20% of the company, and §4(3) allowed a minority of 20% of shareholders to block any decisions. The Lower Saxony government held those shares. Germany argued that the 1960 law was based on a private agreement between workers, trade unions and the state, and so was not within the free movement of capital provisions under TFEU article 63, which did not have horizontal direct effect. Workers and trade unions had relinquished a claim for ownership over the company for assurance of protection against any large shareholder who could gain control over the company.

== Judgment ==
The Grand Chamber of the Court of Justice of the European Union held that the Volkswagen Act 1960 violated TFEU art 63. It was disproportionate for the government's stated aim of protecting workers or minority shareholders, or for industrial policy.

26 Even if, as the Federal Republic of Germany submits, the VW Law does no more than reproduce an agreement which should be classified as a private law contract, it must be stated that the fact that this agreement has become the subject of a Law suffices for it to be considered as a national measure for the purposes of the free movement of capital.

27 The exercise of legislative power by the national authorities duly authorised to that end is a manifestation par excellence of State power.

[...]

38 As the Federal Republic of Germany has observed, the capping of voting rights is a recognised instrument of company law.

39 It is common ground, moreover, that, while the first sentence of Paragraph 134(1) of the Law on public limited companies lays down the principle that voting rights must be proportionate to the share of capital, the second sentence thereof allows a limitation on the voting rights in certain cases.

[...]

50 Paragraph 4(3) of the VW Law thus creates an instrument enabling the Federal and State authorities to procure for themselves a blocking minority allowing them to oppose important resolutions, on the basis of a lower level of investment than would be required under general company law.

51 By capping voting rights at the same level of 20%, Paragraph 2(1) of the VW Law supplements a legal framework which enables the Federal and State authorities to exercise considerable influence on the basis of such a reduced investment.

52 By limiting the possibility for other shareholders to participate in the company with a view to establishing or maintaining lasting and direct economic links with it which would make possible effective participation in the management of that company or in its control, this situation is liable to deter direct investors from other Member States.

53 This finding cannot be undermined by the argument advanced by the Federal Republic of Germany to the effect that Volkswagen’s shares are among the most highly-traded in Europe and that a large number of them are in the hands of investors from other Member States.

54 As the Commission has argued, the restrictions on the free movement of capital which form the subject-matter of these proceedings relate to direct investments in the capital of Volkswagen, rather than portfolio investments made solely with the intention of making a financial investment (see Commission v Netherlands, paragraph 19) and which are not relevant to the present action. As regards direct investors, it must be pointed out that, by creating an instrument liable to limit the ability of such investors to participate in a company with a view to establishing or maintaining lasting and direct economic links with it which would make possible effective participation in the management of that company or in its control, Paragraphs 2(1) and 4(3) of the VW Law diminish the interest in acquiring a stake in the capital of Volkswagen.

[...]

64 Paragraph 4(1) of the VW Law thus establishes an instrument which gives the Federal and State authorities the possibility of exercising influence which exceeds their levels of investment. As a corollary, the influence of the other shareholders may be reduced below a level commensurate with their own levels of investment.

[...]

66 By restricting the possibility for other shareholders to participate in the company with a view to establishing or maintaining lasting and direct economic links with it such as to enable them to participate effectively in the management of that company or in its control, Paragraph 4(1) of the VW Law is liable to deter direct investors from other Member States from investing in the company’s capital.

67 For the same reasons as those set out in paragraphs 53 to 55 of this judgment, this finding cannot be undermined by the Federal Republic of Germany’s argument that there is a keen investment interest in Volkswagen shares on the international financial markets.

68 In the light of the foregoing, it must be held that Paragraph 4(1) of the VW Law constitutes a restriction on the movement of capital within the meaning of Article 56(1) EC.

[...]

70 In the alternative, the Federal Republic of Germany submits that the provisions of the VW Law criticised by the Commission are justified by overriding reasons in the general interest. That Law, which is part of a particular historical context, established an ‘equitable balance of powers’ in order to take into account the interests of Volkswagen’s employees and to protect its minority shareholders. The Law thus pursues a socio-political and regional objective, on the one hand, and an economic objective, on the other, which are combined with objectives of industrial policy.

71 According to the Commission, which disputes the relevance of those historic considerations, the VW Law does not address requirements of general interest, since the reasons relied on by the Federal Republic of Germany are not applicable to every undertaking carrying on an activity in that Member State, but seek to satisfy interests of economic policy which cannot constitute a valid justification for restrictions on the free movement of capital (Commission v Portugal, paragraphs 49 and 52).

Findings of the Court

72 The free movement of capital may be restricted by national measures justified on the grounds set out in Article 58 EC or by overriding reasons in the general interest to the extent that there are no Community harmonising measures providing for measures necessary to ensure the protection of those interests (see Commission v Portugal, paragraph 49; Commission v France, paragraph 45; Commission v Belgium, paragraph 45; Commission v Spain, paragraph 68; Commission v Italy, paragraph 35; and Commission v Netherlands, paragraph 32).

73 In the absence of such Community harmonisation, it is in principle for the Member States to decide on the degree of protection which they wish to afford to such legitimate interests and on the way in which that protection is to be achieved. They may do so, however, only within the limits set by the Treaty and must, in particular, observe the principle of proportionality, which requires that the measures adopted be appropriate to secure the attainment of the objective which they pursue and not go beyond what is necessary in order to attain it....

74 As regards the protection of workers’ interests, invoked by the Federal Republic of Germany to justify the disputed provisions of the VW Law, it must be held that that Member State has been unable to explain, beyond setting out general considerations as to the need for protection against a large shareholder which might by itself dominate the company, why, in order to meet the objective of protecting Volkswagen’s workers, it is appropriate and necessary for the Federal and State authorities to maintain a strengthened and irremovable position in the capital of that company.

75 In addition, as regards the right to appoint representatives to the supervisory board, it must be stated that, under German legislation, workers are themselves represented within that body.

76 Consequently, the Member State’s justification based on the protection of workers cannot be upheld.

== Significance ==
Soon after the decision, which removed shareholder control from the State of Lower Saxony, the management practices leading to the Volkswagen emissions scandal began. In 2015, it was revealed that Volkswagen management had systematically deceived US, EU and other authorities about the level of toxic emissions from diesel exhaust engines. VW engineers fixed software to switch off emissions reduction filters while VW cars were driving, but switch on when being tested in regulator laboratories. This occurred while the major shareholders, who directly acquired dominance from the decision, were members of the Porsche family with a controlling share and appointing 5 of the supervisory board members, and the petroleum-based economy's Qatar Investment Authority with a 17% stake.

== See also ==
- European environmental law
- United Kingdom enterprise law
