= Employee Involvement Directive 2001 =

The Employee Involvement Directive 2001/86/EC is an EU Directive concerning the right of workers to elect members of the supervisory board in a European Company. It is a supplement to the European Company Regulation and inspired by the European Works Council Directive.

== History ==
The Directive is largely modeled after the European Works Council Directive 94/45/EC. Conversely, according to the European Economic and Social Committee, the updated EWC Recast Directive 2009/38/EC was inspired by the Employee Involvement Directive.

=== Court case ===
In 2020, a dispute between SAP union representatives and management, concerning SAP's conversion from a German Aktiengesellschaft into a European Company, the German Federal Labour Court referred a question to the European Court of Justice (C-677/20), whether German legislation on trade union representation in Supervisory Boards was compatible with Article 4 of the Employee Involvement Directive, specifically whether distinct elections for employee representatives and trade union representatives must be maintained. The Court Advocate-General agreed that national laws regarding trade union representatives and electoral procedures remained applicable even after the conversion of an Aktiengesellschaft into a European Company. While trade unions ver.di and IG Metall would continue to be able to nominate representatives, they would no longer be able to hold separate elections as previously done in the prior Aktiengesellschaft form.

== Content ==
EU member states differ in the degree of worker involvement in corporate management. In Germany, most large corporations are required to allow employees to elect a certain percentage of seats on the supervisory board. Other member states, have no such requirement, and furthermore in these states such practices are largely unknown and considered a threat to the rights of management.

These differing traditions of worker involvement have held back the adoption of the Statute for a European Company Regulation 2001 for over a decade. States without worker involvement provisions were afraid that the European Company ("Societas Europaea" - SE) regulation might lead to having such provisions being imposed on their companies; and states with those provisions were afraid they might lead to those provisions being circumvented.

A compromise, contained in the Directive, was worked out as follows: worker involvement provisions in the SE will be decided upon by negotiations between employees and management before the creation of the SE. If agreement cannot be reached, provisions contained in the Directive will apply. The Directive provides for worker involvement in the SE if a minimum percentage of employees from the entities coming together to form the SE enjoyed worker involvement provisions. The Directive permits Member States to not implement these default worker involvement provisions in their national law, but then an SE cannot be created in that member state if the provisions in the Directive would apply and negotiations between workers and management are unsuccessful.

=== Definition ===
Definition of employee participation: it does not mean participation in day-to-day decisions, which are a matter for the management, but participation in the supervision and strategic development of the company.

=== Participation ===
- If the two parties do not reach a satisfactory arrangement, a set of standard principles set out in the Annex to the Directive becomes applicable.
- Several models of participation are possible: firstly, a model in which the employees form part of the supervisory board or of the administrative board, as the case may be; secondly, a model in which the employees are represented by a separate body; and finally, other models to be agreed between the management or administrative boards of the founder companies and the employees or their representatives in those companies, the level of information and consultation being the same as in the case of the second model. The general meeting may not approve the formation of an SE unless one of the models of participation defined in the Directive has been chosen.
- The employees' representatives must be provided with such financial and material resources and other facilities as enable them to perform their duties properly.
- With regard to a European company formed through a merger, the standard principles relating to worker participation will apply where at least 25% of the employees had the right to participate in decisions before the merger. Here a political agreement proved impossible until the Nice summit in December 2000. The compromise adopted by the Heads of State or Governments allowed a Member State not to apply the Directive to SEs formed from a merger, in which case the SE could not be registered in the Member State in question unless an agreement had been concluded between the management and employees, or that no SE employee had the right of participation before the formation of the SE.

=== Employment contracts and pensions ===
Employment contracts and pensions are not covered by the Directive. With regard to occupational pension schemes, the SE is covered by the provisions laid down in the proposal for a directive on institutions for occupational schemes, presented by the Commission in October 2000, in particular in connection with the possibility of introducing a single pension scheme for all their employees in the European Union.

== See also ==
- European Works Council
- Societas cooperativa Europaea
- European economic interest grouping
- Societas privata Europaea
