= Societas unius personae =

A societas unius personae (SUP; Latin for "single-person company") was a legal form for a single-member private limited liability company proposed by the European Commission. However, the Commission withdrew the proposal in 2018 due to opposition within the European Parliament.

== See also ==
- European corporate law
  - Societas Europaea
  - Societas cooperativa Europaea
  - Societas privata Europaea
