= Share capital =

Portion of a company's equity

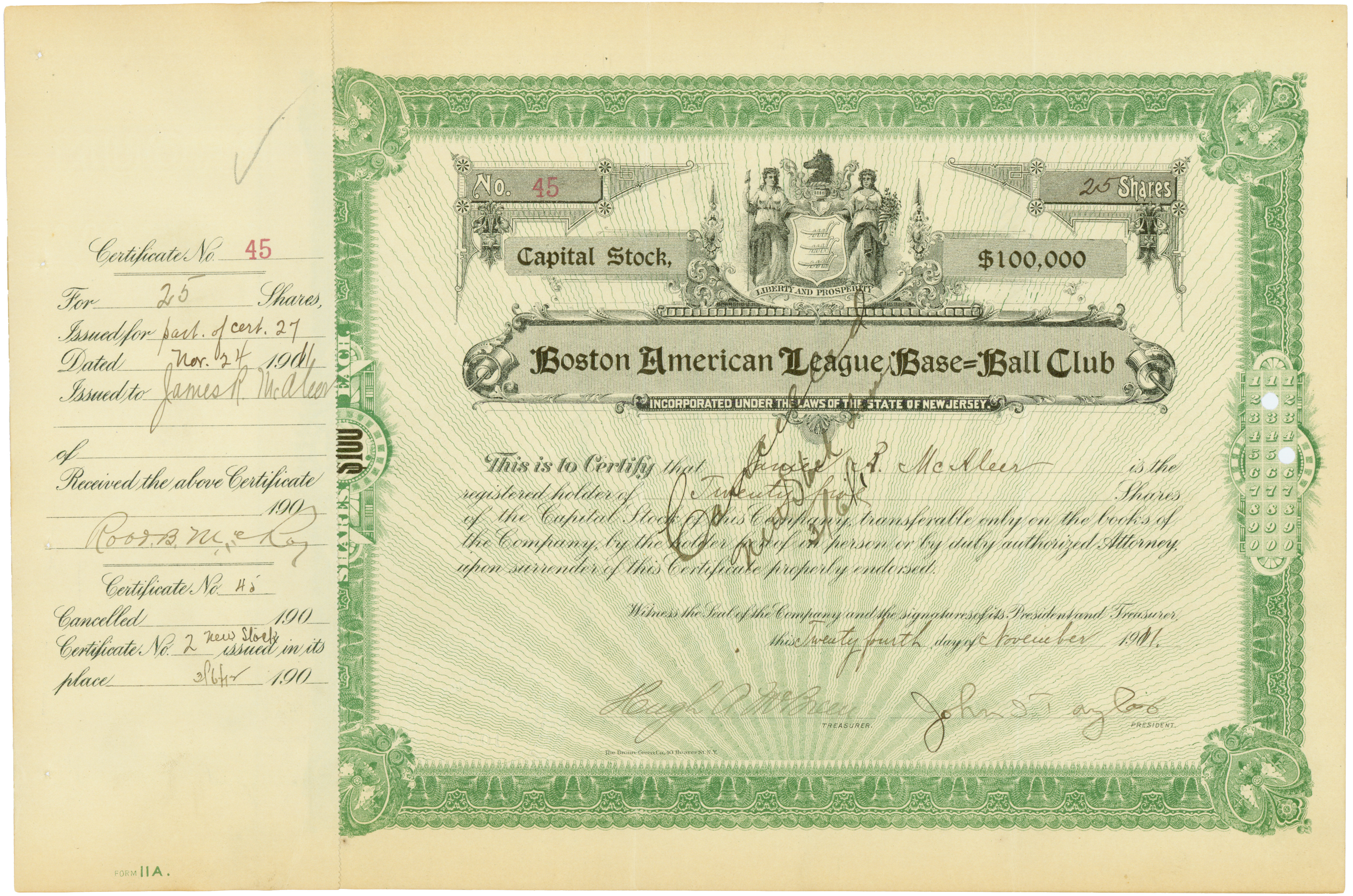
Share certificate of the Boston American League Base-Ball Club shows a capital stock of $100 000

A corporation's share capital, commonly referred to as capital stock in the United States, is the portion of a corporation's equity that has been derived by the issue of shares in the corporation to a shareholder, usually for cash.

== Definition ==
In accounting, the share capital of a corporation is the nominal value of issued shares (that is, the sum of their par values, sometimes indicated on share certificates). If the allocation price of shares is greater than the par value, as in a rights issue, the shares are said to be sold at a premium (variously called capital surplus or share premium, additional paid-in capital or paid-in capital in excess of par).

This equation shows the constituents that make up a company's real share capital:

$$\sum\text{Share capital = Number of shares issued} \times \text{(Par value + Share premium)}$$

This is differentiated from share capital in the accounting sense, as it presents nominal share capital and does not take the premium value of shares into account, which instead is reported as additional paid-in capital.

== Legal capital ==
Legal capital is a concept used in European corporate and foundation law, United Kingdom company law, and various other corporate law jurisdictions to refer to the sum of assets contributed to a company by shareholders when they are issued shares. The law often requires that this capital is maintained and that dividends are not paid when a company is not showing a profit above the level of historically recorded legal capital.

== See also ==
- Balance sheet
- Capital impairment
- Market capitalization
- Paid-in capital
- Share dilution
