= Netherlands v Essent NV =

Netherlands v Essent
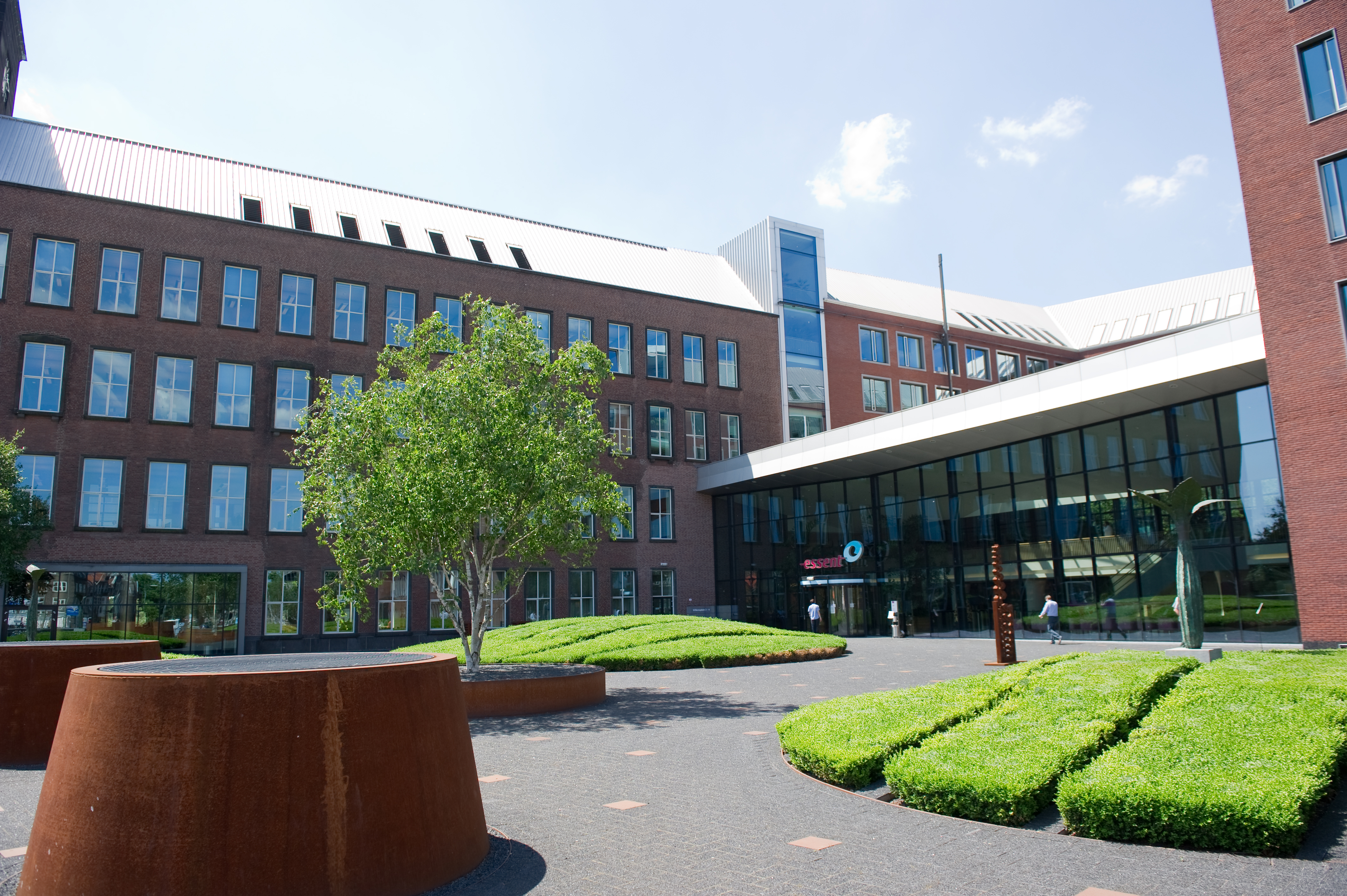
- Essent NV headquarters.
- Court: Court of Justice of the EU
- Citation: (2013) C‑105/12 to C‑107/12

Keywords
- Public ownership, energy

Netherlands v Essent NV (2013) C‑105/12 is an EU law case relevant for UK enterprise law on electricity generation governance.

== Facts ==
Essent NV claimed that Dutch law violated the Gas and Electricity Directives requirement of ‘unbundling of transmission systems owners’, to separate organisation and management of transmission systems (but not ownership of assets). It also claimed a violation of TFEU art 63 on free movement of capital. Under Dutch law there was (1) a prohibition on privatisation of shares in electricity or gas distribution system operators, all of which had to be public, and (2) a group prohibition, so that system operators must not be part of the same group as companies that generate, supply or trade electricity, and (3) a prohibition on members of a group burdening themselves with debts and other things that ‘may adversely affect system operation’. The Dutch government argued all measures fell within the protection of TFEU art 345, that member states can determine rules ‘governing the system of property ownership’.

== Judgment ==
The Court of Justice held that Dutch law was compatible with the Directives.

30 In that regard, it is apparent from the Court’s case-law that the Treaties do not preclude, as a general rule, either the nationalisation of undertakings (see, to that effect, Case 6/64 Costa [1964] ECR 585, at 598) or their privatisation (see, to that effect, Case C‑244/11 Commission v Greece [2012] ECR, paragraph 17).

31 It follows that Member States may legitimately pursue an objective of establishing or maintaining a body of rules relating to the public ownership of certain undertakings.

[...]

36 However, Article 345 TFEU does not mean that rules governing the system of property ownership current in the Member States are not subject to the fundamental rules of the FEU Treaty, which rules include, inter alia, the prohibition of discrimination, freedom of establishment and the free movement of capital...

53 Accordingly, as regards the prohibition of privatisation, which falls within the scope of Article 345 TFEU, it has indeed been held that that provision cannot justify a restriction on the rules relating to the free movement of capital (see Case C‑171/08 Commission v Portugal, paragraph 64 and the case‑law cited, and Commission v Poland, paragraph 44). That does not however mean that the interest underlying the choice of the legislature in relation to the rules on the public or private ownership of the electricity or gas distribution system operator may not be taken into consideration as an overriding reason in the public interest.

[...]

65 That finding is supported by Directives 2009/72 and 2009/73 which are designed, inter alia, to achieve the same objectives, as can be seen both from recitals 3, 4, 9 to 12, 15, 25 and 44 in the preamble to Directive 2009/72 and from recitals 3, 4, 6 to 13, 22 and 40 of Directive 2009/73. In particular, recitals 4, 9, 11, 15, 25, 26 and 44 of Directive 2009/72 and recitals 4, 6, 8, 12, 22, 25 and 40 in the preamble to Directive 2009/73 disclose the wish of the European Union legislature to ensure non‑discriminatory access to electricity or gas distribution systems and transparency in the markets, to prevent cross-subsidisation, to ensure adequate investment in the networks in order to guarantee the stable security of supply of electricity and gas and to prevent exchanges of confidential information between the system operators and the generation/production and supply undertakings.

66 Consequently, the objectives referred to by the referring court may, in principle, as overriding reasons in the public interest, justify the identified restrictions on fundamental freedoms.

== See also ==
- United Kingdom enterprise law
