= Hebdomad =

Hebdomad (Ancient Greek: ἑβδομάς) may refer to:

- On Hebdomads, a work of the Hippocratic Corpus
- Hebdomad, a term used by Neoplatonist philosophers such as Iamblichus and Proclus in reference to the intellect
- The Hebdomad, the seven world-creating archons in most Gnostic systems: see Archon (Gnosticism)#Hebdomad
- On Hebdomads (De hebdomadibus), a work of the Neoplatonist Boethius commented upon by Thomas Aquinas, in which the hebdomads are common mental conceptions or axioms
- The Celestial Hebdomad, the archons who make up the ruling council of Mount Celestia in Dungeons & Dragons

== See also ==
- Hebdomadal Council
