= Dunlop Report =

The Dunlop Commission on the Future of Worker-Management Relations: Final Report (1994), commonly called the Dunlop Report, was a major review of US labor law, containing recommendations for reform, established by the US Department of Labor and US Department of Commerce.

They reported to Secretary of Labor Robert B. Reich and Secretary of Commerce Ronald H. Brown.

== Contents ==
=== Introduction: The Workplace and Society ===
The Commission found that the labor market was influenced by,

- a long-term decline in the rate of productivity;
- an increased globalization of economic life;
- a shift in employment to service-producing industries from goods-producing industries;
- a shift in the occupational structure toward white-collar jobs that require considerable education; and
- a decline in the prevalence of collective bargaining.

=== Employee Involvement ===
The Commission found,

- where employee participation is sustained and integrated with other practices, it usually improves economic performance;
- the trends suggest employee participation programs will increase in future years; and
- survey data suggest that between 40 and 50 million workers would take part in employee participation programs, but do not have the chance.

=== Worker Representation and Collective Bargaining ===
The Commission found that on workplace representation,

- American society supports the right to join a union and to engage in collective bargaining if a majority of workers so desire;
- Representation elections are a highly conflictual activity for workers, unions, and companies; and
- Roughly one-third of workplaces that vote to be represented by unions do not obtain a collective bargaining contract with their employer.

=== Employment Litigation and Dispute Resolution ===
The Commission observed Federal workplace laws increased a lot since the 1960s, accompanied by more rules and administration. Also,

- Workplace litigation caseloads and costs rose faster than those in other areas of law;
- Employment cases in Federal courts increased by more than 400 percent between 1971 and 1991; and
- Neither mediation and arbitration nor the newer, more informal employee participation and alternative dispute resolution systems are being utilized to their full potential for dealing with issues and resolving disputes that are now regulated by law.

== See also ==
- US labor law
- Bullock Report (1977)
- UK labour law
- UK company law
