= Volkswagen Act =

1960 West German laws regarding privatisation and government control of companies

The Volkswagen Act is a set of German (originally West German) federal laws enacted in 1960, regulating the privatization of Volkswagenwerk GmbH into the Volkswagen Group. In order to maintain government control in the privately owned company, it stipulated that the votes in major shareholder meeting resolutions require 4/5th (80%) agreement. This part of the law was deemed to violate the "free movement of capital" principle of European Union corporate law. After a series of challenges from 2007 to 2013, the German parliament finally amended the part in 2013 to EU Court of Justice satisfaction.

== Law ==
The full title of the law is "Gesetz über die Überführung der Anteilsrechte an der Volkswagenwerk Gesellschaft mit beschränkter Haftung in private Hand", usually abbreviated to VW-Gesetz, 'VW law'. It was enacted on 28 July 1960, when Volkswagenwerk GmbH was privatized. The government of the German state Lower Saxony held a voting share of 20.2 percent, which gave it the ability to veto major decisions and prevent takeovers by other shareholders, regardless of the extent of the ownership. It also allowed the government of Lower Saxony to appoint two members to the Volkswagen Group's board of directors.

== Challenges and the EU court ruling ==
In October 2007, the European Court of Justice ruled that the VW law was illegal because of its protectionist nature. At that time, the Porsche SE holding company held 30.9% of VW Group shares and there had been speculation that Porsche SE would be interested in buying all shares if the law did not stand in its way. The Court of Justice also prevented the government appointing Volkswagen board members.

In 2008, the German government then rewrote the Volkswagen law, attempting to sidestep the ECJ judgment; removing restrictions on share ownership but still requiring an 80% majority for important decisions, so Lower Saxony would still be able to block major business decisions and takeovers. European Commission regulators took the German government to court again and requested a fine of €31,114 per day backdated to when the law was declared illegal in 2007, plus larger ongoing fines from the date of a second court judgment. In March 2012, the German government insisted that it would defend the Volkswagen Law in court.

In October 2013, the EU Court of Justice ruled that the redraft of the Volkswagen law “complied in full” with Union law, bringing "the matter to a close,” as Chantal Hughes, spokeswoman for EU Internal Markets Commissioner Michel Barnier said.

== Outcome ==
During the above developments, the Porsche SE holding company, which traditionally had close relationships with Volkswagen, increased its holding of Volkswagen Group's shares as follows:

Porsche SE holding shares in Volkswagen Group
| Oct 2005 | Nov 2006 | Mar 2007 | Sep 2008 | Jan 2009 |
|---|---|---|---|---|
| 18.53% | 27.4% | 30.9% | 35.79% | 50.76% |

Porsche had many difficulties financing the large investment, and agreed in August 2009 to sell its automobile manufacturing business to Volkswagen Group, while retaining the majority ownership in Volkswagen Group. Porsche SE officially became the controlling owner of Volkswagen Group when the 'Volkswagen Law' was amended to abolish the 20% owner veto rights in 2013, with 50.76% ownership.
