= Kamer van Koophandel en Fabrieken voor Amsterdam v Inspire Art Ltd =

Kamer van Koophandel v Inspire Art Ltd
- Court: European Court of Justice
- Full case name: Kamer van Koophandel en Fabrieken voor Amsterdam v Inspire Art Ltd
- Decided: 30 December 2003
- Citation: (2003) C-167/01

Keywords
- Right of freedom of establishment

Kamer van Koophandel en Fabrieken voor Amsterdam v Inspire Art Ltd (2003) C-167/01 is a leading corporate law case, concerning the EU law of freedom of establishment for companies.

== Facts ==
The art company "Inspire Art Ltd" claimed that the Dutch law requirement for a minimum capital to operate in the Netherlands was an unjustified restriction on its right to freedom of establishment (now under TFEU article 49). The company was incorporated in the United Kingdom, which accords to the "incorporation theory" rather than the "real seat theory" of establishing a business in conflict of laws. It wished to carry out business in the Netherlands, running an Amsterdam art studio. Dutch law, however, applied to pseudoforeign companies to impose minimum capital requirements on businesses operating within the country. When the Dutch authorities required the company to comply with Dutch law, the question was whether that disproportionately interfered with Inspire Art Ltd's right to freedom of establishment.

== Judgment ==
The Court of Justice held that creditor protection did not justify imposing additional requirements to those of the United Kingdom, where Inspire Art Ltd was incorporated. In this case, creditors were sufficiently protected by the fact that the company held itself out not as a Dutch company but one subject to UK law. The minimum capital requirements were a disproportionate method of achieving the aim of creditor protection.

132 The justifications put forward by the Netherlands Government, namely, the aims of protecting creditors, combating improper recourse to freedom of establishment, and protecting both effective tax inspections and fairness in business dealings, fall therefore to be evaluated by reference to overriding reasons related to the public interest.

133 It must be borne in mind that, according to the Court's case-law, national measures liable to hinder or make less attractive the exercise of fundamental freedoms guaranteed by the Treaty must, if they are to be justified, fulfil four conditions: they must be applied in a non-discriminatory manner; they must be justified by imperative requirements in the public interest; they must be suitable for securing the attainment of the objective which they pursue, and they must not go beyond what is necessary in order to attain it (see, in particular, Case C-19/92 Kraus [1993] ECR I-1663, paragraph 32; Case C-55/94 Gebhard [1995] ECR I-4165, paragraph 37, and Centros, paragraph 34).

134 in consequence, it is necessary to consider whether those conditions are fulfilled by provisions relating to minimum capital such as those at issue in the main proceedings.

135 First, with regard to protection of creditors, and there being no need for the Court to consider whether the rules on minimum share capital constitute in themselves an appropriate protection measure, it is clear that Inspire Art holds itself out as a company governed by the law of England and Wales and not as a Netherlands company. Its potential creditors are put on sufficient notice that it is covered by legislation other than that regulating the formation in the Netherlands of limited liability companies and, in particular, laying down rules in respect of minimum capital and directors' liability. They can also refer, as the Court pointed out in Centros, paragraph 36, to certain rules of Community law which protect them, such as the Fourth and Eleventh Directives.

136 Second, with regard to combating improper recourse to freedom of establishment, it must be borne in mind that a Member State is entitled to take measures designed to prevent certain of its nationals from attempting, under cover of the rights created by the Treaty, improperly to circumvent their national legislation or to prevent individuals from improperly or fraudulently taking advantage of provisions of Community law (Centros, paragraph 24, and the decisions cited therein).

137 However, while in this case Inspire Art was formed under the company law of a Member State, in the case in point the United Kingdom, for the purpose in particular of evading the application of Netherlands company law, which was considered to be more severe, the fact remains that the provisions of the Treaty on freedom of establishment are intended specifically to enable companies formed in accordance with the law of a Member State and having their registered office, central administration or principal place of business within the Community to pursue activities in other Member States through an agency, branch or subsidiary ( Centros, paragraph 26).

138 That being so, as the Court confirmed in paragraph 27 of Centros, the fact that a national of a Member State who wishes to set up a company can choose to do so in the Member State the company-law rules of which seem to him the least restrictive and then set up branches in other Member States is inherent in the exercise, in a single market, of the freedom of establishment guaranteed by the Treaty.

139 in addition, it is clear from settled case-law ( Segers, paragraph 16, and Centros, paragraph 29) that the fact that a company does not conduct any business in the Member State in which it has its registered office and pursues its activities only or principally in the Member State where its branch is established is not sufficient to prove the existence of abuse or fraudulent conduct which would entitle the latter Member State to deny that company the benefit of the provisions of Community law relating to the right of establishment.

140 Last, as regards possible justification of the WFBV on grounds of protection of fairness in business dealings and the efficiency of tax inspections, it is clear that neither the Chamber of Commerce nor the Netherlands Government has adduced any evidence to prove that the measure in question satisfies the criteria of efficacy, proportionality and non-discrimination mentioned in paragraph 132 above.

141 To the extent that the provisions concerning minimum capital are incompatible with freedom of establishment, as guaranteed by the Treaty, the same must necessarily be true of the penalties attached to non-compliance with those obligations, that is to say, the personal joint and several liability of directors where the amount of capital does not reach the minimum provided for by the national legislation or where during the company's activities it falls below that amount.

142 The answer to be given to the second question referred by the national court must therefore be that the impediment to the freedom of establishment guaranteed by the Treaty constituted by provisions of national law, such as those at issue, relating to minimum capital and the personal joint and several liability of directors cannot be justified under Article 46 EC, or on grounds of protecting creditors, or combating improper recourse to freedom of establishment or safeguarding fairness in business dealings or the efficiency of tax inspections.

== See also ==
- UK company law
- European company law

US cases

- Liggett v. Lee 288 U.S. 517 (1933)
