= Commission v Portugal =

EU law case

- Court: Court of Justice of the European Union
- Citation: (2010) C-171/08

Keywords
- Golden shares, corporate power

Commission v Portugal (2010) C-171/08 is an EU law case, relevant for UK enterprise law, concerning European company law. Following a trend in cases such as Commission v United Kingdom, and Commission v Netherlands, it struck down public oversight, through golden shares of Portuguese telecommunications companies.

== Facts ==
In January 2008, the European Commission referred Portugal to the European Court of Justice because it considered that the special rights conferred on the State by its golden shares in Portugal Telecom (PT) discouraged investment from other Member States in violation of the EC Treaty.

== Judgment ==
The Grand Chamber of the Court of Justice of the European Union held that the Portuguese law violated free movement of capital.

60 Thus, the Portuguese State’s holding of those golden shares, in so far as it confers on that State an influence on the management of PT which is not justified by the size of its shareholding in that company, is liable to discourage operators from other Member States from making direct investments in PT since they could not be involved in the management and control of that company in proportion to the value of their shareholdings (see, inter alia, Case C‑112/05 Commission v Germany [2007] ECR I‑8995, paragraphs 50 to 52).

61 Similarly, the structuring of the special shares at issue may have a deterrent effect on portfolio investments in PT in so far as a possible refusal by the Portuguese State to approve an important decision, proposed by the organs of the company concerned as being in the company’s interests, is in fact capable of depressing the value of the shares of that company and thus reduces the attractiveness of an investment in such shares (see, to that effect, Commission v Netherlands, paragraph 27).

62 In those circumstances, it must be found that the Portuguese State’s holding of the golden shares at issue constitutes a restriction on the free movement of capital for the purposes of Article 56(1) EC.

== See also ==
- United Kingdom enterprise law
