= Universities Tests Act 1871 =

Act of the Parliament of the United Kingdom

- Act of Parliament
- Parliament of the United Kingdom
- Long title: An Act to alter the law respecting Religious Tests in the Universities of Oxford, Cambridge, and Durham, and in the Halls and Colleges of those Universities.
- Citation: 34 & 35 Vict. c. 26
- Territorial extent: United Kingdom

Dates
- Royal assent: 16 June 1871
- Commencement: 16 June 1871 (Note: The Acts of Parliament (Commencement) Act 1793.)
Other legislation
Amends	See § Repealed enactments
Repeals/revokes	See § Repealed enactments
Amended by	Statute Law Revision Act 1883; Universities (Scotland) Act 1932; Church of England (Worship and Doctrine) Measure 1974

Status: Amended

Text of statute as originally enacted

Revised text of statute as amended

Text of the Universities Tests Act 1871 as in force today (including any amendments) within the United Kingdom, from legislation.gov.uk.

The Universities Tests Act 1871 (34 & 35 Vict. c. 26) is an act of the Parliament of the United Kingdom. It abolished religious "Tests" and allowed Roman Catholics, non-conformists and non-Christians to take up professorships, fellowships, studentships and other lay offices at the universities of Oxford, Cambridge and Durham. It also forbade religious tests for "any degree (other than a degree in divinity)".

The act built upon earlier acts that had limited religious tests in the universities concerned. The Oxford University Act 1854 (17 & 18 Vict. c. 81) had abolished tests at matriculation and for the degree of BA, but not for higher degrees. The Cambridge University Act 1856 (19 & 20 Vict. c. 88) abolished tests for all degrees in Arts, Law, Music and Medicine, but stated that the degree would not enable the holder to become a member of senate or hold "any Office … which has been heretofore always held by a Member of the United Church of England and Ireland" unless they made a declaration that they were "bona fide a Member of the Church of England" (the latter provisions were abolished by the 1871 Act). The Dean and Chapter of Durham Cathedral (the governing body of Durham University at that time) changed the university's regulations in 1865 to remove religious tests on degrees (except in theology).

Passed during the course of William Ewart Gladstone's first ministry, the act was to obtain support from the non-conformists since these were a major support group for the Liberal Party. Gladstone himself accepted the act reluctantly, and on the understanding that it would leave new collegiate foundations at Oxford and Cambridge free to impose tests, as Hertford College, Keble College and Selwyn College did.

The direct instigation for this legislation was the widely publicised case of Numa Edward Hartog, the first Jewish Senior Wrangler in the history of Cambridge University, who could not accept the fellowship that would otherwise routinely be offered, because he could not subscribe to the required test on account of his religion. His testimony before the House of Lords helped secure passage of the bill, after the Lords had twice blocked similar legislation in 1869 and 1870.

Numa Hartog would have been the first Jew after the passing of this act to be elected a fellow at the University of Cambridge, but he died of smallpox. The first Jew to be elected a fellow was Samuel Alexander at Lincoln College, University of Oxford in 1882.

== Provisions ==
=== Repealed enactments ===
Section 8 of the act repealed 5 enactments, listed in the schedule to the act.

Citation	Short title	Description	Extent of repeal
14 Cha. 2. c. 4 (Note: This is the citation in The Statutes of the Realm.)	Act of Uniformity 1662	An Act for the uniformity of public prayers and administration of sacraments and other rites and ceremonies, and for establishing the form of making, ordaining, and consecrating bishops, priests, and deacons in the Church of England.	So much of section six as is unrepealed; section eight; and section thirteen, except so far as it relates to the colleges of Westminster, Winchester, and Eton, or any governor or head thereof.
1 Geo. 1. St. 2. c. 13	Security of the Sovereign Act 1714	An Act for the further security of His Majesty's person and government, and the succession of the Crown in the heirs of the late Princess Sophia being Protestants, and for extinguishing the hopes of the pretended Prince of Wales, and his open and secret abettors.	So much as is unrepealed.
31 Geo. 3. c. 32	Roman Catholic Relief Act 1791	An Act to relieve upon conditions, and under restrictions, the persons therein described from certain penalties and disabilities to which Papists or persons professing the Popish religion are by law subjects.	So much of section fourteen as relates to any of the universities of Oxford, Cambridge, and Durham.
10 Geo. 4. c. 7	Roman Catholic Relief Act 1829	An Act for the relief of His Majesty's Roman Catholic subjects.	So much as relates to any of the said universities or any college therein.
19 & 20 Vict. c. 88	Cambridge University Act 1856	An Act to make further provision for the good government and extension of the University of Cambridge, of the colleges therein, and of the College of King Henry the Sixth at Eton.	Section forty-five from the words " but such degree " inclusive, to the end of the section.

== See also ==
- Universities Act 1825
