= Hebdomadal Council =

Governing body of the University of Oxford

The Hebdomadal Council was the chief executive body for the University of Oxford from its establishment by the Oxford University Act 1854 until its replacement, in the Michaelmas term of 2000, by the new University Council. Chaired by the Vice-Chancellor, the Hebdomadal Council held statutory responsibility for the management of the university's finances and property, university administration, and relations between the university and all outside institutions. Direct responsibility for academic administration was delegated to the General Board of the Faculties, with the Hebdomadal Council holding an oversight role.

Eighteen members of the council were elected by Congregation of the full faculty. In the 1980s, there were also two student observers, one undergraduate and one postgraduate, selected by the Oxford University Student Union and the Oxford University Graduate Union respectively. The students were permitted to speak on agenda items, but not to vote. Hebdomadal Council's agenda was typically in two parts, and the students were asked to leave before the second half of the meeting. The council had the prerogative of initiating resolutions and statutes, which were submitted to Congregation for approval. It met once every two weeks during university terms and twice during the long vacation.
