= Syriac Union Party =

Syriac Union Party may refer to:

- Syriac Union Party (Lebanon)
- Syriac Union Party (Syria)
