= Cambridge University Act 1856 =

Act of the Parliament of the United Kingdom

Cambridge University Act 1856 (Note: The citation of this act by this short title was authorised by section 1 of, and the first schedule to, the Short Titles Act 1896. Due to the repeal of those provisions it is now authorised by section 19(2) of the Interpretation Act 1978.)
- Act of Parliament
- Parliament of the United Kingdom
- Long title: An Act to make further Provision for the good Government and Extension of the University of Cambridge, of the Colleges therein, and of the College of King Henry the Sixth at Eton.
- Citation: 19 & 20 Vict. c. 88
- Territorial extent: United Kingdom

Dates
- Royal assent: 29 July 1856
- Commencement: 29 July 1856 (Note: The Acts of Parliament (Commencement) Act 1793.)
Other legislation
Amended by	Universities and College Estates Act 1858; Universities Tests Act 1871; Statute Law Revision Act 1875; Statute Law Revision Act 1892; Statute Law (Repeals) Act 2004
Relates to	Oxford University Act 1854

Status: Amended

Text of statute as originally enacted

Revised text of statute as amended

Text of the Cambridge University Act 1856 as in force today (including any amendments) within the United Kingdom, from legislation.gov.uk.

The Cambridge University Act 1856 (19 & 20 Vict. c. 88) is an act of the Parliament of the United Kingdom, which regulates corporate governance at the University of Cambridge. It requires that most members of full-time academic staff have voting rights over the Council of the Senate, which is ultimately the leading body in the university's administration. The act resulted in new subjects being introduced.

== Provisions ==
Sections 1 and 2 stipulated that commissioners must be appointed and for how long. This resulted in 8 commissioners being appointed.

Section 5, states that the Council of the Senate is the top management body.

Section 12, concerns "Votes of electors." It states:

In all elections of members of the Council every elector may vote for any number of persons, being heads of colleges, professors, or members of the Senate as aforesaid respectively, not exceeding the number of heads of colleges, professors, or members of the Senate respectively to be then chosen; and in case of an equality of votes for any two or more of such heads of colleges, professors, or members of the Senate respectively, the Vice-Chancellor shall name from amongst those persons for whom the number of votes shall be equal as many as shall be requisite to complete the number of heads of colleges, professors, or members of the Senate to be then chosen.

The act also removed some religious requirements and restrictions.

== Subsequent developments ==
Section 45 of the act, from the words " but such degree " inclusive, to the end of the section, was repealed by section 8 of, and the schedule to, the Universities Tests Act 1871 (34 & 35 Vict. c. 26), which came into force on 16 June 1871.

== See also ==
- UK labour law
- UK company law
- Universities in the UK

== Bibliography ==
- The Statutes: Second Revised Edition. HMSO. London. 1895. Volume 9. Pages 833 to 838.
