= Oxford University Act 1854 =

Act of the Parliament of the United Kingdom

Oxford University Act 1854 (Note: The citation of this act by this short title was authorised by section 1 of, and the first schedule to, the Short Titles Act 1896. Due to the repeal of those provisions it is now authorised by section 19(2) of the Interpretation Act 1978. This short title was previously conferred on this Act by the schedule to the Universities of Oxford and Cambridge Act 1877 (40 & 41 Vict. c. 48), and by the Short Titles Act 1892.)
- Act of Parliament
- Parliament of the United Kingdom
- Long title: An Act to make further Provision for the good Government and Extension of the University of Oxford, of the Colleges therein, and of the College of Saint Mary Winchester.
- Citation: 17 & 18 Vict. c. 81
- Territorial extent: United Kingdom

Dates
- Royal assent: 7 August 1854
- Commencement: 7 August 1854 (Note: The Acts of Parliament (Commencement) Act 1793.)
Other legislation
Amended by	Oxford University Act 1862; Statute Law Revision Act 1875; Statute Law Revision Act 1892; Statute Law (Repeals) Act 2004
Relates to	Cambridge University Act 1856

Status: Amended

Text of statute as originally enacted

Revised text of statute as amended

Text of the Oxford University Act 1854 as in force today (including any amendments) within the United Kingdom, from legislation.gov.uk.

The Oxford University Act 1854 (17 & 18 Vict. c. 81), also known as the Oxford University Reform Act 1854 or the University Reform Act 1854, is an act of the Parliament of the United Kingdom, which regulates corporate governance at the University of Oxford, England. It established the Hebdomadal Council, the leading body in the university's administration, stating that most members of full-time academic staff were to have voting rights over it. In the year 2000, the Hebdomadal Council was replaced by the University Council, which is responsible to the Congregation of staff members.

== Provisions ==
The act made substantial changes to how Oxford University was administered. It established the Hebdomadal Council as the university's governing body; appointed Commissioners to deal with emoluments and variations in historic endowments; and opened the university to students outside the Church of England, as there was no longer a requirement to undergo a theological test or take the Oath of Supremacy. In practice, this allowed many more Scots to attend the university.

In 1850, a parliamentary commission was set up to revise the statutes drawn up by Archbishop William Laud. The original Bill proposed by Lord John Russell was much more limited in scope, however dissenters effectively mobilised, threatening to block the bill, unless the theological tests were dropped.

The reforms curbed the power of heads of colleges, creating a more centralised university authority. Dons no longer had to be in holy orders.

== Theological tests ==
The subject of dropping the theological Test was not new as James Heywood described in the parliamentary debate:

"The subject was not a new one, for it had been brought before Parliament in 1772, when a petition was presented from a large number of clergymen on the subject of an alteration in clerical oaths, and in 1834 the late Mr. Alderman Wood brought in a Bill for the abolition of matriculation and degree oaths in the Universities of Oxford and Cambridge, which passed this House by a large majority, but was lost in the other House. The practical result of the defeat of this Bill was the establishment of the University of London, but, notwithstanding the success of that great institution, the Dissenters still considered they had a right to send their sons to the Universities of Oxford and Cambridge if they pleased. The Duke of Wellington, when Chancellor of Oxford University, endeavoured to persuade the University to consent to some alterations in these oaths, proposing that the Thirty-nine Articles should be laid aside, and that all students should be required to subscribe themselves members of the Established Church. The Hebdomadal Board laid the proposition before Convocation, which, however, rejected it. In 1843 the subject was introduced into Parliament by Mr. Christie, and now it was brought forward again. He thought he was justified in saying that there was nothing to be expected from the University itself on this subject, nor from the operation of a mere enabling Bill. Such an alteration as he now proposed was not one which could be expected to be made by an exclusively clerical body such as the University of Oxford; and he thought it was a question with which it was particularly the province of Parliament to deal."

== See also ==
- Universities Tests Act 1871

== Bibliography ==
- Paterson, William (ed). The Practical Statutes of the Session 1854. John Crockford. London. 1854. Pages 126 to 128.
- The Oxford University Calendar 1859. Pages 25 to 42.
