= Report of the committee of inquiry on industrial democracy =

The Report of the committee of inquiry on industrial democracy (1977) Cmnd 6706, also the Bullock Report for short, was a report proposing for a form of worker participation or workers' control, chaired by Alan Bullock. The idea was seen by some as a way to solve the chronic industrial disputes and to enhance participation of employees in their workplace.

== Background ==
A Committee of Enquiry into Industrial Democracy was set up by the Labour government of Harold Wilson in December 1975, in response to the European Commission's Draft Fifth Company Law Directive which sought to harmonise worker participation in management of companies across Europe. Its terms of reference started with the words,

Accepting the need for a radical extension of industrial democracy in the control of companies by means of representation on boards of directors, and accepting the essential role of trade union organisations in this process to consider how such an extension can best be achieved ...

== Content ==
The committee, chaired by Bullock, published its report in January 1977. This report was not unanimous. The majority report was signed by Bullock and as members of the committee: three trade unionists, two academics and a city solicitor.

=== Majority report ===
The key idea was that in all boards of companies with over 2000 employees, there would be a right to have representation for workers. A company wide codetermination referendum would be held in firms with over 2000 employees, with the entire workforce voting. After approval, only union members would be able to vote for candidates to the supervisory board. Shareholders and unions would appoint x representatives each. The deadlock breaker would be an independent y appointee from the government.

The Report further recommended that nondelegable board functions would be codified as the right to submit resolutions to shareholders concerning (1) winding up (2) capital structure changes (3) article alterations (4) dividends (5) disposal of substantial parts of the business. The board, not management, should have exclusive control of (1) appointment of management and (2) disposition of resources not concerning rules on capital structure and dividends. Shareholders would retain a veto power, however, over such decisions.

=== Minority report ===
The minority report, produced by the three industrialists on the committee, proposed a second tier board for workers to have input on. They recommended election of representatives to be open to nonunion members.

== Reception ==
The report was received with trepidation but not rejecting the principles laid down. In a publication of the City Company Law Committee, A reply to Bullock, the authors said,

The more people are able to influence decisions which closely affect their work the more effective will that involvement be; the more effective the involvement the greater the commitment to the company’s objectives which, in the final analysis, will be concerned with generating wealth or services for the community as a whole.

Nevertheless, they did not want direct participation because they viewed shareholders to be the "owners" of companies.

the fundamental basis of the joint stock company system... [is] a system based on the concept that the ultimate authority and control over a company rests with those who provide the capital (i.e. the shareholders) in general meeting. It is they who, at the outset, come together to incorporate the company as a legal entity and it is they who by the contract of incorporation embodied in the company’s original constitution agree between themselves what the company’s business and objects shall be and in what way the company shall be organised and managed.

There was also strong opposition to the report from many who might have been expected to support it, including the Institute for Workers' Control.

== See also ==
- British labour law
- UK company law
- Dunlop Commission (1994)
