= Software Upgrade Protocol =

The Software Upgrade Protocol (or SUP) System is a set of programs developed by Carnegie Mellon University in the 1980s (as was the Andrew File System). It provides for collections of files to be maintained in identical versions across a number of machines.

It was originally developed under the Mach operating system, but implementations are provided with Debian & Ubuntu Linux distributions.
