= Centros Ltd v Erhvervs- og Selskabsstyrelsen =

1999 European company law case

Centros Ltd v Erhvervs-og Selskabsstyrelsen
- Court: European Court of Justice
- Citations: (1999) C-212/97, [1999] ECR I-1459

Keywords
- Right of freedom of establishment

Centros Ltd v Erhvervs- og Selskabsstyrelsen (1999) C-212/97 is a European company law case, concerning the right of freedom of establishment.

== Facts ==
Centros Ltd, a wine import and export business, was registered in the United Kingdom and applied in Denmark, where it traded, to register there. The Danish authority, Erhvervs- og Selskabsstyrelsen, refused on the basis that the company was attempting to circumvent the Danish requirement for companies to pay up a minimum of share capital. In Denmark this was 200,000 Danish kroner, while in the UK the minimum capital requirement was £1. The Danish registry justified its enforcement of the rule as a way to protect creditors and prevent fraudulent insolvency. Centros Ltd argued that it had the right to be recognised in Denmark under the provisions of freedom of establishment in the EC Treaty, articles 52, 56 and 58. The Danish court referred the matter to the European Court of Justice (ECJ).

== Judgment ==
The European Court of Justice held that the Danish authorities' refusal to recognise the company was contrary to articles 52, 56 and 58, and that its rules on minimum capital were not justified by the aim of protecting creditors by anticipating the risks of fraudulent bankruptcy due to the insolvency of companies having inadequate initial capitalisation. The national authorities could adopt less restrictive measures, such as enabling creditors to obtain necessary guarantees, or could adopt measures preventing or penalising fraud, if necessary with the cooperation of another Member State.

== See also ==
- UK company law
- European company law
- Paul v Virginia, 75 US 168 (1869)
