= Societas privata Europaea =

A European Private Company (Latin: societas privata Europaea, SPE) was a legal form for a limited liability company proposed by the European Commission in 2008, to be introduced across the European Union. It would have formed a company of limited liability, similar to the English limited company, the Austrian or the German GmbH, the Dutch BV, the Belgian BVBA or the French SARL. The aim of the proposal was to remove the current need for limited companies to reincorporate themselves in the corresponding legal form in all the EU member countries in which they wanted to trade, which represents a substantial administrative burden for small and medium enterprises.

It was proposed that the SPE company form would be introduced across the EU and EEA area from July 2010. The SPE was finally set to arrive in 2011 and but was slowed down by the current ruling parties of Germany (CDU) to allow their own national alternative (the mini-GmbH) to grow first. The SPE could facilitate starting new businesses and European Integration and would thus help small businesses and entrepreneurs due to manageable capital requirements not too dissimilar to the British limited company (Ltd).

However, the European Commission withdrew the proposal in 2014 due to opposition within the European Parliament. Although the proposal acknowledged that employee participation in SPE structures would be covered by the national law of the Member State in which it was established and mentioned how laws would be applied if an SPE wanted to move its registered office to another Member State, MEPs were concerned that the proposed company format might compromise worker's co-determination rights.

== See also ==
- Societas Europaea
- Societas cooperativa Europaea
