= Shareholder Rights Directive 2007 =

The Shareholder Rights Directive 2007/36/EC, amended by the Directive (EU) 2017/828, establishes requirements in relation to the exercise of certain shareholder rights attached to EU-listed companies. It also establishes specific requirements in order to encourage shareholder engagement, in particular in the long term. (Note: Article 1, paragraph 1 of amended directive, as amended by Directive (EU) 2017/828.)

The Shareholder Rights Directive 2007 replaced the First Company Law Directive 68/151/EEC. It set out minimum requirements relating to the holding of meetings in the EU. The directive was amended and largely extended by Directive 2017/828/EU of 17 May 2017, also known as SRD II, as regards the encouragement of long-term shareholder engagement.

== Contents ==
The directive's structure is as follows:

- Chapter Ia. Identification of shareholders, transmission of information, facilitation of exercise of shareholders' rights
- Chapter Ib. Transparency of institutional investors, asset managers and proxy advisors
- Chapter II on General meetings of shareholders including the remuneration of directors and related party transactions:
  - art 5, shareholders should be given 21 days' notice of meetings, votes by electronic means should be facilitated
  - art 6, that a threshold no higher than 5% of shareholders must be able to table resolutions at meetings
  - art 9, to ask questions
  - art 10, to vote by proxy
  - art 14, voting results publishable on website

Under SRD II, companies must develop and publish a policy stating how voting rights operate and how shareholders are engaged in the running of the company. The principle known as "comply or explain" operates, i.e. companies are not obliged to adhere to this requirement but if they choose not to do so they must explain why.

== See also ==
- UK company law
- European company law
