= European company law =

Part of European Union law

European company law is the part of European Union law which concerns the formation, operation and insolvency of companies (or corporations) in the European Union. The EU creates minimum standards for companies throughout the EU, and has its own corporate forms. All member states continue to operate separate companies acts, which are amended from time to time to comply with EU Directives and Regulations. There is, however, also the option of businesses to incorporate as a Societas Europaea (SE), which allows a company to operate across all member states.

== History ==
There have been, since the European Community was founded in 1957, a series of directives creating minimum standards for business across the European Union. A central aim restated in each Directive is to reduce the barriers to freedom of establishment of businesses in the European Union through a process of harmonising the basic laws. The object is that when laws are harmonised, business will not be deterred by different or more onerous laws, but at the same time harmonisation provides a basic level of protection for investors in each member state, none of which are forced into regulatory competition.

A scheme for companies to have EU-level registrations have been in discussions since 1988; however it has not been finalized.

== Formations and civil law ==
=== Registration rules ===
- First Company Law Directive 68/151/EEC, on co-ordination of safeguards (...) for the protection of the interests of members and others, repealed by 2009/101/EC. This concerned company registrations, transactional validity, the effect of ultra vires transactions, or transactions by improperly incorporated businesses. Now replaced by Directive 2017/1132
- Eleventh Company Law Directive 89/666/EEC, on disclosure requirements in respect of branches opened in a Member State by certain types of company governed by the law of another State
- Twelfth Company Law Directive 89/667/EEC, on single-member private limited-liability companies, repealed by 2009/102/EC
- Draft Fourteenth Company Law Directive on cross-border transfer of the registered offices of limited liability companies
- Directive (EU) 2017/1132 replaced Directive 68/151/EEC and laid down rules concerning the disclosure and interconnection of central, commercial and companies registers of Member States
- Directive (EU) 2019/1151 amended Directive (EU) 2017/1132 as regards the use of digital tools and processes in company law, adopted 20 June 2019, requiring member state transposition, in most respects, by 1 August 2021, but at a later date if agreed by the Commission where there were "particular difficulties" with national implementation.

=== Common registers ===
All companies within the EU can be found in both the Business Registers Interconnection System (BRIS) and the VAT Information Exchange System (VIES). The former can be accessed through European e-Justice portal, and serves to fulfil the once-only principle. The latter helps suppliers easily identify VAT numbers, since the rules of where VAT must be paid in cross-border transactions vary.

=== European company forms ===
Since 2002, a "European Company" (or Societas Europaea, abbreviated to "SE") has been available for incorporation in the Statute for a European Company Regulation 2001. This sets out basic provisions on the method of registration (e.g. by merger or reincorporation of an existing company) but then states that wherever the SE has its registered office, the law of that member state supplements the rules of the Statute. The Employee Involvement Directive 2001 also adds that, when an SE is incorporated, employees have the default right to retain all existing representation on the board of directors that they have, unless the negotiate by collective agreement a different or better plan than is provided for in existing member state law.

=== Conflicts of law and free movement ===
The Court of Justice held in Centros that freedom of establishment requires companies operate in any member state they choose. This has been argued to risk a "race to the bottom" in standards, although the Court of Justice soon affirmed in Inspire Art that companies must still comply with proportionate requirements that are in the "public interest".

- Gebhard v Consiglio dell'Ordine degli Avvocati e Procuratori di Milano [1995] ECR I-4165 (C-55/94)
- Überseering BV v Nordic Construction Company Baumanagement GmbH (C-208/00)

== Corporate governance ==
Among the most important governance standards are rights to vote for who is on the board of directors for investors of labour and capital.

=== Shareholder rights ===
The Shareholder Rights Directive 2007 requires shareholders be able to make proposals, ask questions at meetings, vote by proxy and vote through intermediaries. This has become increasingly important as most company shares are held by institutional investors (primarily asset managers or banks, depending on the member state) who are holding "other people's money". A large proportion of this money comes from employees and other people saving for retirement, but who do not have an effective voice. Unlike Switzerland after a 2013 people's initiative, or the U.S. Dodd-Frank Act 2010 in relation to brokers, the EU has not yet prevented intermediaries casting votes without express instructions of beneficiaries.

- Draft Ninth Company Law Directive, on corporate groups

=== Employee rights ===
A Draft Fifth Company Law Directive proposed in 1972, which would have required EU-wide rights for employees to vote for boards stalled mainly because it attempted to require two-tier board structures, although most EU member states have codetermination today with unified boards.

=== Investor rights ===
A series of rights for ultimate investors exist in the Institutions for Occupational Retirement Provision Directive 2003. This requires duties of disclosure in how a retirement fund is run, funding and insurance to guard against insolvency, but not yet that voting rights are only cast on the instructions of investors. By contrast, the Undertakings for Collective Investment in Transferable Securities Directive 2009 does suggest that investors in a mutual fund or ("collective investment scheme") should control the voting rights. The UCITS Directive 2009 is primarily concerned with creating a "passport". If a firm complies with rules on authorisation, and governance of the management and investment companies in an overall fund structure, it can sell its shares in a collective investment scheme across the EU. This forms a broader package of Directives on securities and financial market regulation, much of which has been shaped by experience in the 2008 financial crisis. Additional rules on remuneration practices, separating depositary bodies in firms from management and investment companies, and more penalties for violations were inserted in 2014. These measures are meant to decrease the risk to investors that an investment goes insolvent. The Markets in Financial Instruments Directive 2004 applies to other businesses selling financial instruments. It requires similar authorisation procedures to have a "passport" to sell in any EU country, and transparency of financial contracts through duties to disclose material information about products being sold, including disclosure of potential conflicts of interest with clients. The Alternative Investment Fund Managers Directive 2011 applies to firms with massive quantities of capital, over €100 million, essentially hedge funds and private equity firms. Similarly, it requires authorisation to sell products EU wide, and then basic transparency requirements on products being sold, requirements in remuneration policies for fund managers that are perceived to reduce "risk" or make pay "performance" related. They do not, however, require limits to pay. There are general prohibitions on conflicts of interest, and specialised prohibitions on asset stripping. The Solvency II Directive 2009 is directed particularly at insurance firms, requiring minimum capital and best practices in valuation of assets, again to avoid insolvency. The Capital Requirements Directives contain analogous rules, with a similar goals, for banks. To administer the new rules, the European System of Financial Supervision was established in 2011, and consists of three main branches: the European Securities and Markets Authority in Paris, the European Banking Authority in London and the European Insurance and Occupational Pensions Authority in Frankfurt.

== Corporate finance ==
=== Capital maintenance ===
- Second Company Law Directive 77/91/EEC, on formation of public companies and the maintenance and alteration of capital, updated by 2006/68/EC and 2009/109/EC, repealed by 2012/30/EU

=== Mergers and acquisitions ===
- Third Company Law Directive 78/855/EEC, on mergers of public limited liability companies, repealed by 2011/35/EU
- Sixth Company Law Directive 82/891/EEC, on division of public companies, amended by 2007/63/EC
- Tenth Company Law Directive 2005/56/EC, on cross-border mergers of limited liability companies
- Thirteenth Company Law Directive 2004/25/EC, on takeover bids
- Merger Tax Directive 90/434/EEC, on the common system of taxation applicable to mergers, divisions, transfers of assets and exchanges of shares concerning companies of different Member States, repealed by 2009/133/EC

=== Accounting and audit ===
- Fourth Company Law Directive 78/660/EEC, on accounting standards, repealed by the EU Accounting Directive 2013/34/EU
- Seventh Company Law Directive 83/349/EEC, on group accounts, repealed by the EU Accounting Directive 2013/34/EU
- Eighth Company Law Directive 84/253/EEC, on the approval of persons responsible for carrying out the statutory audits of accounting document, repealed by 2006/43/EC, on statutory audits of annual accounts and consolidated accounts

=== Market regulation ===
- Market Abuse Directive 2003/6/EC
- Transparency of Listed Companies Directive 2004/109/EC

== Insolvency ==
European insolvency law governs the rules and procedures related to insolvency and bankruptcy within EU member states. It includes the EU Insolvency Regulation, which coordinates cross-border insolvency cases within the EU, except for Denmark. This regulation determines the jurisdiction and applicable law based on the debtor's center of main interests (COMI) and ensures automatic recognition of insolvency proceedings across member states. It promotes cooperation among administrators, courts, and creditors from different jurisdictions to streamline processes and protect the interests of all parties involved. In addition to the EU framework, individual countries have their own national insolvency laws, which complement the European regulations.

== See also ==
- UK company law
- European Union shipping law
- German company law
- US corporate law
- List of company registers
- Swiss referendum "against corporate Rip-offs" of 2013
