= Überseering BV v Nordic Construction Company Baumanagement GmbH =

Überseering BV v Nordic Construction GmbH
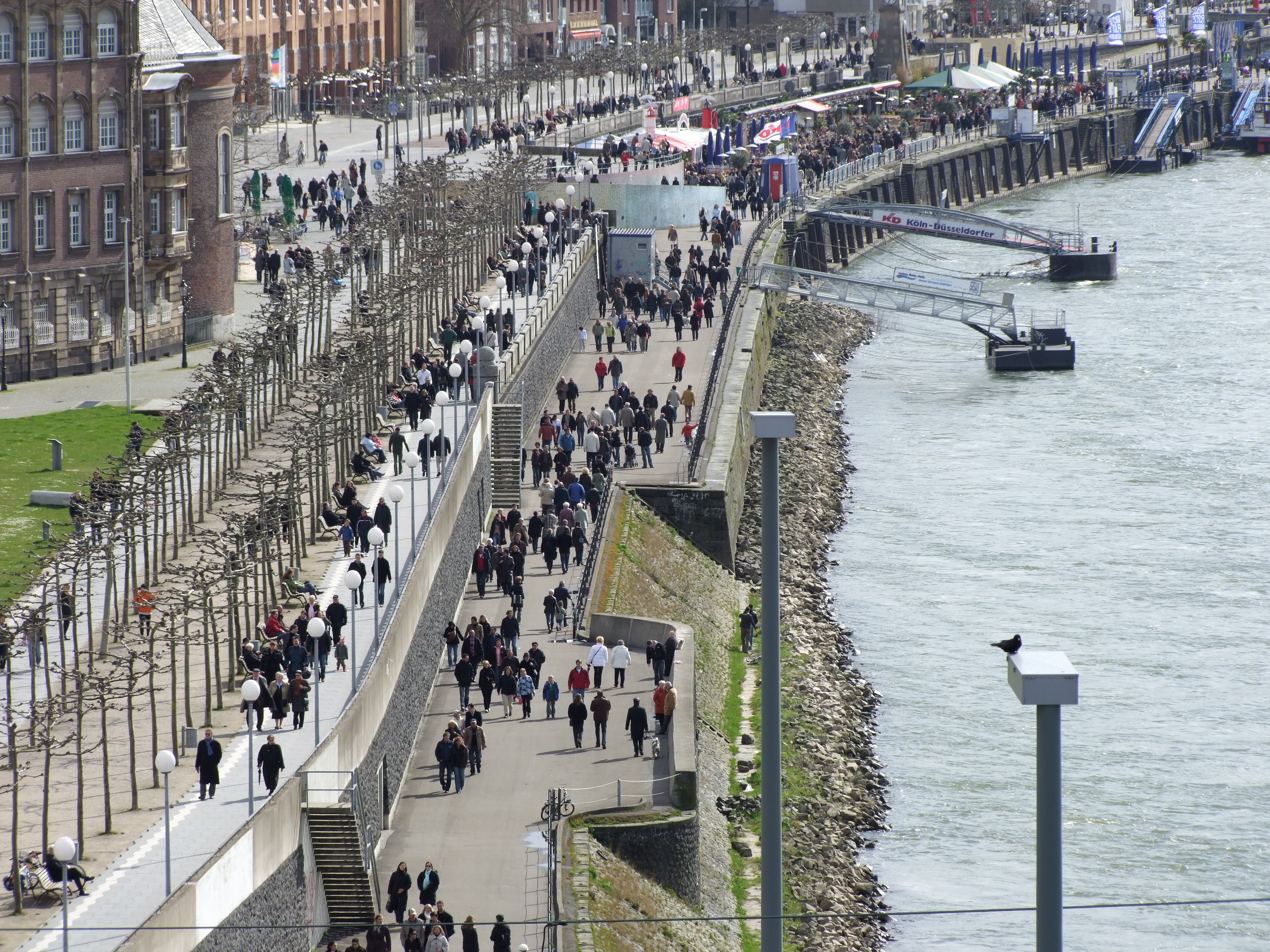
- Court: European Court of Justice
- Full case name: Überseering BV v Nordic Construction Company Baumanagement GmbH
- Decided: 5 November 2002
- Citations: (2002) C-208/00, [2002] ECR I-9919

Keywords
- Right of freedom of establishment

Überseering BV v Nordic Construction Company Baumanagement GmbH (2002) C-208/00 is a European company law case, concerning the right of freedom of establishment.

== Facts ==
Überseering BV, a Dutch company, was told that because its shares had been all acquired by two German nationals but it had failed to reincorporate under German law, it had no legal identity in Germany and could not, therefore, enforce a contract to develop land in Düsseldorf against Nordic Construction. German law took the view that companies should only be recognised as having legal rights under the law where their "real" seat was. This was Germany (as Überseering was "really" operating there), but it could not have legal standing unless it was first incorporated under German law. Thus, German law did not follow the "incorporation" view, that it would acknowledge legal standing according to a foreign law when a company was incorporated in the Netherlands. Überseering BV argued that this represented a restriction on its right to freedom of establishment, and this was prohibited by TEC article 43 and 48 (now TFEU articles 49 and 54). The German court referred to the ECJ the question of whether German law could lead to this result.

== Judgment ==
The European Court of Justice held that TEC articles 43 and 48 precluded German courts denying legal capacity to companies like Überseering BV, because it was fundamental that states recognised companies incorporated abroad, regardless of whether member states had conventions on mutual recognition of companies under article 293. Despite change in ownership, Überseering BV was still a valid company in the Netherlands. There was no countervailing justification by any overriding requirements relating to the general interest to not uphold the right of freedom of establishment.

3 The Zivilprozessordnung (German Code of Civil Procedure) provides that an action brought by a party which does not have the capacity to bring legal proceedings must be dismissed as inadmissible. Under Paragraph 50(1) of the Zivilprozessordnung any person, including a company, having legal capacity has the capacity to be a party to legal proceedings: legal capacity is defined as the capacity to enjoy rights and to be the subject of obligations.

4 According to the settled case-law of the Bundesgerichtshof, which is approved by most German legal commentators, a company's legal capacity is determined by reference to the law applicable in the place where its actual centre of administration is established (`Sitztheorie' or company seat principle), as opposed to the `Gründungstheorie' or incorporation principle, by virtue of which legal capacity is determined in accordance with the law of the State in which the company was incorporated. That rule also applies where a company has been validly incorporated in another State and has subsequently transferred its actual centre of administration to Germany.

5 Since a company's legal capacity is determined by reference to German law, it cannot enjoy rights or be the subject of obligations or be a party to legal proceedings unless it has been reincorporated in Germany in such a way as to acquire legal capacity under German law.

[...]

59 A necessary precondition for the exercise of the freedom of establishment is the recognition of those companies by any Member State in which they wish to establish themselves.

60 Accordingly, it is not necessary for the Member States to adopt a convention on the mutual recognition of companies in order for companies meeting the conditions set out in Article 48 EC to exercise the freedom of establishment conferred on them by Articles 43 EC and 48 EC, which have been directly applicable since the transitional period came to an end. It follows that no argument that might justify limiting the full effect of those articles can be derived from the fact that no convention on the mutual recognition of companies has as yet been adopted on the basis of Article 293 EC.

61 Second, it is important to consider the argument based on the decision in Daily Mail and General Trust, which was central to the arguments put to the Court. It was cited in order, in some way, to assimilate the situation in Daily Mail and General Trust to the situation which under German law entails the loss of legal capacity and of the capacity to be a party to legal proceedings by a company incorporated under the law of another Member State.

62 It must be stressed that, unlike Daily Mail and General Trust, which concerned relations between a company and the Member State under whose laws it had been incorporated in a situation where the company wished to transfer its actual centre of administration to another Member State whilst retaining its legal personality in the State of incorporation, the present case concerns the recognition by one Member State of a company incorporated under the law of another Member State, such a company being denied all legal capacity in the host Member State where it takes the view that the company has moved its actual centre of administration to its territory, irrespective of whether in that regard the company actually intended to transfer its seat.

[...]

66 ... unlike the case before the national court in this instance, Daily Mail and General Trust did not concern the way in which one Member State treats a company which is validly incorporated in another Member State and which is exercising its freedom of establishment in the first Member State.

[...]

68 At paragraph 20 of that judgment, the Court pointed out that the legislation of the Member States varies widely in regard both to the factor providing a connection to the national territory required for the incorporation of a company and to the question whether a company incorporated under the legislation of a Member State may subsequently modify that connecting factor.

69 The Court concluded, at paragraph 23 of the judgment, that the Treaty regarded those differences as problems which were not resolved by the Treaty rules concerning freedom of establishment but would have to be dealt with by legislation or conventions, which the Court found had not yet been done.

70 In so doing, the Court confined itself to holding that the question whether a company formed in accordance with the legislation of one Member State could transfer its registered office or its actual centre of administration to another Member State without losing its legal personality under the law of the Member State of incorporation and, in certain circumstances, the rules relating to that transfer were determined by the national law in accordance with which the company had been incorporated. It concluded that a Member State was able, in the case of a company incorporated under its law, to make the company's right to retain its legal personality under the law of that State subject to restrictions on the transfer of the company's actual centre of administration to a foreign country.

71 By contrast, the Court did not rule on the question whether where, as here, a company incorporated under the law of a Member State (`A') is found, under the law of another Member State (`B'), to have moved its actual centre of administration to Member State B, that State is entitled to refuse to recognise the legal personality which the company enjoys under the law of its State of incorporation (`A').

[...]

76 It follows from the foregoing considerations that Überseering is entitled to rely on the principle of freedom of establishment in order to contest the refusal of German law to regard it as a legal person with the capacity to be a party to legal proceedings.

[...]

82 In those circumstances, the refusal by a host Member State (`B') to recognise the legal capacity of a company formed in accordance with the law of another Member State (`A') in which it has its registered office on the ground, in particular, that the company moved its actual centre of administration to Member State B following the acquisition of all its shares by nationals of that State residing there, with the result that the company cannot, in Member State B, bring legal proceedings to defend rights under a contract unless it is reincorporated under the law of Member State B, constitutes a restriction on freedom of establishment which is, in principle, incompatible with Articles 43 EC and 48 EC.

As to whether the restriction on freedom of establishment is justified

[...]

84 The German Government has argued in the alternative, should the Court find that application of the company seat principle entails a restriction on freedom of establishment, that the restriction applies without discrimination, is justified by overriding requirements relating to the general interest and is proportionate to the objectives pursued.

[...]

92 It is not inconceivable that overriding requirements relating to the general interest, such as the protection of the interests of creditors, minority shareholders, employees and even the taxation authorities, may, in certain circumstances and subject to certain conditions, justify restrictions on freedom of establishment.

93 Such objectives cannot, however, justify denying the legal capacity and, consequently, the capacity to be a party to legal proceedings of a company properly incorporated in another Member State in which it has its registered office. Such a measure is tantamount to an outright negation of the freedom of establishment conferred on companies by Articles 43 EC and 48 EC.

== See also ==
- UK company law
- European company law
