= European Union shipping law =

European Union shipping law is the body of law developed by the European Union ("EU") relating to shipping or maritime matters.

== Introduction ==
Shipping is extremely important to the European Union. The EU is the world's second-largest trading bloc and therefore very dependent on shipping. About 90% of its trade with the rest of the world is carried by sea and around 40% of its internal trade is carried by sea. The EU has a coastline twice that of Russia and three times that of the US so it is acutely aware of maritime safety and environmental issues. More than 350 million passengers sail annually through its 1200 ports. It is also a major employer in the EC and a significant source of foreign income.

== Origins ==
In principle, all of EU law applies to the maritime sector. Nonetheless, despite the Treaty establishing the European Economic Community (now the European Community (the "EC")) having been signed on 25 March 1957, it was not until the 1970s, that there was any serious attempt to develop European laws relating to shipping. During the 1970s, a number of attempts were made to develop laws in particular areas such as liner conferences, the environment and pilotage. It was not however until the 1980s, particularly 1986, that a serious body of EC shipping law evolved. On 22 December 1986, the Council of Ministers adopted four Regulations which lay the foundations for most of EC shipping law. In the 1990s and 2000s so far, the law has developed in various areas including competition and anti-trust law but also in the areas as safety, the environment, ports and employment.

== Freedom to Provide Services ==
In principle, all EU shipowners are free to provide maritime services either between Member States or within Member States (i.e., provide cabotage services). The right to provide international maritime services (provided one EU port was involved) is enshrined in Regulation 4055/86. The freedom to provide services between ports within one and the same EU Member States (i.e., so-called "cabotage" services) provided more difficult to achieve and it was only accomplished when Regulation 3577/92 was adopted by the EU.

== Competition Law ==
One of the most controversial topics is the application of competition law to maritime transport and, in particular, liner conferences.

Competition law is the set of legal rules designed to ensure freedom or rivalry in the marketplace. It is known as "antitrust law" in the US.

Between 1986 and 2006, the EC had a special regime exempting many liner conferences from the application of the prohibition on anti-competitive arrangements (i.e. Article 81 of the EC Treaty (now Article 101 of the Treaty on the Functioning of the European Union)). This exemption was contained in Regulation 4056/86 which has now been repealed, effective October 2008. Many other countries such as Singapore, Japan and China, in an effort to prevent destructive competition, are allowing price-setting immunity of liner conferences.

EU State aid law is becoming of increasing significance in the sector. Ports have to ensure that developments are compliant with State aid law and Member States may therefore have to notify proposed aid schemes to the European Commission for prior approval.

== Sources ==
- Summaries of EU legislation > Transport > Waterborne transport
- European Commission > Transport > Maritime transport
- European Commission > Maritime Affairs
- See Vincent J G Power, EU Shipping Law (3rd ed., Routledge, London, 2019).
