= 2013 Swiss executive pay initiative =

Successful corporate governance initiative

The 2013 Swiss executive pay initiative of 2013 was a successful federal popular initiative in Switzerland to control executive pay of companies listed on the stock market and to increase shareholders' say in corporate governance. It was one of three questions put to the electorate in the March 2013 referendums. The vote took place on the 3 March 2013, and passed with a majority of 67.9%, with a 46% turnout. The initiative mandates the Federal Government to implement the provisions within one year, pending implementation of the final law.

The initiative partly reflected developments in the United States Dodd-Frank Wall Street Reform Act 2010 §957 that prohibited brokers from voting on their clients' money, and the Stewardship Code 2010 in the United Kingdom, which placed a duty on financial intermediaries to disclose their voting policies and make use of voting power. It also reflected a long running debate in Germany, which had not yet been reformed, about the position of banks. In German, the title of the referendum is the Eidgenössische Volksinitiative «gegen die Abzockerei», literally "Against Rip-off" and in French, the Initiative populaire « contre les rémunérations abusives », literally "against abusive remuneration".

== Background ==
Due to corporate scandals before the 2008 financial crisis, Thomas Minder launched a campaign "against rip-off salaries" (gegen die Abzockerei). By 26 February 2008, Minder had gathered 118,583 signatures to launch a referendum under the Swiss constitutional rules. Minder's concern focused on

- the excesses of executive pay
- the ability of banks, who in the Swiss (and German) system of shareholding hold all share certificates, to vote by proxy using shares owned by other people, and
- the inability of pension beneficiaries and policyholders to determine their deposits were being used for voting.

Supporters of the initiative spent 200,000 Swiss franc while opponents spent 8 million Swiss francs in their campaign to block the reform. The public campaign drew attention to the large payouts for executives of Novartis and major Swiss banks. On March 3, the referendum results showed that 67.9 per cent of voters supported the reforms.

A German initiative followed a month later, and if passed would represent a significant broadening of pay controls in Europe.

== Text of the initiative ==
The translation of the text is as follows.

I

The Federal Constitution of 18 April 1999 is amended as follows:

Art. 95 paragraph 3 (new)

(3) In order to protect the economy, private property and shareholders and to ensure sustainable management of businesses, the law requires that Swiss public companies listed on stock exchanges in Switzerland or abroad observe the following principles:

(a) Each year, the Annual General Meeting votes the total remuneration (both monetary and in kind) of the Board, the Executive Board and the Advisory Board. Each year, the AGM elects the President of the Board or the Chairman of the Board and, one by one, the members of the board, the members of the Compensation Committee and the independent proxy voter or the independent representative. Pension funds vote in the interests of their policyholders and disclose how they voted. Shareholders may vote electronically at a distance; proxy voting by a member of the company or by a depositary is prohibited.

(b) Board members receive no compensation on departure, or any other compensation, or any compensation in advance, any premium for acquisitions or sales of companies and cannot act as consultants or work for another company in the group. The management of the company cannot not be delegated to a legal entity.

(c) The company statutes stipulate the amount of annuities, loans and credits to board members, bonus and participation plans and the number of external mandates, as well as the duration of the employment contract of members of the management.

(d) Violation of the provisions set out in letters a to c above shall be sanctioned by imprisonment for up to three years and a fine of up to six years’ remuneration.

II

The transitional provisions of the Federal Constitution shall be amended as follows:

Art. 197 section 8 (new)

8. Transitional provisions for article 95 paragraph 3

Pending implementation of the law, the Federal Council shall implement legal provisions within one year following the acceptance of article 95 alinea 3.

== Results ==
Results map

Against rip-off salaries initiative – Official results
Canton	Yes (%)	No (%)	Voter turnout (%)
Argovia	66.8%	33.2%	44.4%
Appenzell Ausserrhoden	66.3%	33.7%	51.8%
Appenzell Innerrhoden	61.0%	39.0%	41.9%
Basel-Landschaft	67.5%	32.5%	44.5%
Basel-Stadt	67.3%	32.7%	49.4%
Bern	70.3%	29.7%	42.8%
Fribourg	70.3%	29.7%	44.5%
Geneva	67.7%	32.3%	46.5%
Glarus	69.6%	30.4%	36.1%
Grisons	65.5%	34.5%	56.2%
Jura	77.1%	22.9%	40.6%
Lucerne	66.3%	33.7%	46.2%
Neuchâtel	71.9%	28.1%	41.7%
Nidwalden	57.7%	42.3%	49.0%
Obwalden	56.1%	43.9%	51.6%
Schaffhausen	75.9%	24.1%	64.9%
Schwyz	60.8%	39.2%	49.2%
Solothurn	67.9%	32.1%	48.6%
St. Gallen	66.4%	33.6%	44.0%
Ticino	70.7%	29.3%	41.5%
Thurgau	70.5%	29.5%	43.1%
Uri	64.3%	35.7%	41.4%
Vaud	66.5%	33.5%	41.4%
Valais	63.7%	36.3%	67.8%
Zug	58.2%	41.8%	51.9%
Zürich	70.2%	29.8%	47.0%
Switzerland	67.9%	32.1%	46.0%

== Significance ==
The Swiss referendum had an immediate impact on other countries seeking its own reforms. It led to calls by the German Social Democratic Party to introduce similar reforms in Germany and it is quoted in the Bill proposed in Italy on cap-salaries for public employees.

Daniel Alpert of The Century Foundation saw the measures as unnecessary.

== See also ==
- Say on pay
