= Minimum capital =

Minimum capital is a concept used in corporate law and banking regulation to stipulate what assets the organisation must hold as a minimum requirement. The purpose of minimum capital in corporate law is to ensure that in the event of insolvency or financial instability, the corporation has a sufficient equity base to satisfy the claims of creditors. In banking and financial regulation it is normally referred to as the capital requirement.

== Corporate law ==
All public companies within the European Union are required to hold at least €25,000 in capital, although many countries go above this minimum requirement. The requirement is e.g. £50,000 in the United Kingdom (England and Wales), of which at least 25% must be paid up (of the nominal amount and of any premium).

== Banking regulation ==
- Basel II
- Capital Requirements Directive
- Leverage (finance)

== See also ==
- Banking regulation
- Corporate law
- UK insolvency law
