= Draft Fifth Company Law Directive =

The Draft Fifth Company Law Directive (1972–2001) was a European Union proposed directive for a right of co-determination in large companies, i.e. for employees to vote for boards of directors. The draft went through several major revisions, but was never agreed by enough member states and was formally withdrawn in 2001.

== History ==
=== 1972 revision ===
The first Draft Fifth Company Law Directive was adopted by the Mansholt Commission under Commissioner Haferkamp (SPD) on 27 September 1972 proposed that companies must have two-tiered boards of directors and that companies of over 500 workers should appoint one third of members to a supervisory board.

This compulsory two-tiered structure, modelled after German companies, and the requirement of employee participation in management organ were criticised, in particular by countries having no tradition of dual boards or co-determination.

=== 1983 revision ===
On 28 July 1983 a further revision was adopted by the Thorn Commission under Commissioner Narjes (CDU) in an attempt to secure new agreement. The requirement of two tier board was abandoned and the threshold was raised to 1000 workers before codetermination would be required. It envisaged that either board representation would be available for employees on a two or one tier board, or the option of another employee representative body that would receive a copy of all board materials.

=== 1990 and 1991 revisions ===
On 13 December 1990 and 20 November 1991 the next attempts at revising the Directive were adopted by the second college of the Delors Commission under Commissioner Bangemann (FDP) allowed for a third to a half representation.

=== 2001 withdrawal ===
On 11 December 2001 the Prodi Commission withdrew the proposal as "no longer topical".

== See also ==
- EU company law
- EU labour law
