= Societas Europaea =

Public company registered under the corporate law of the European Union

The number of registered societates Europaeae since 2004
View chart definition.
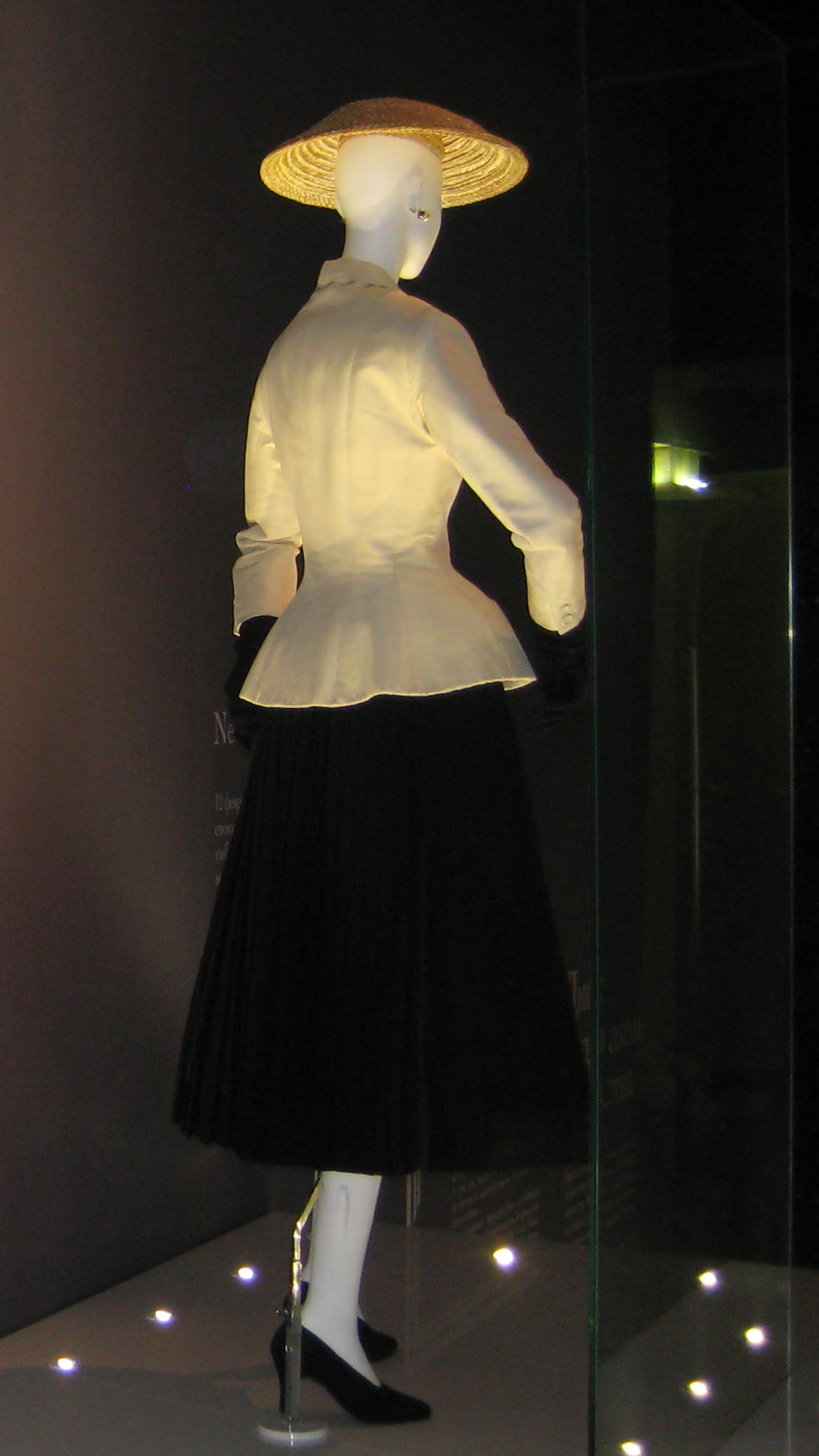
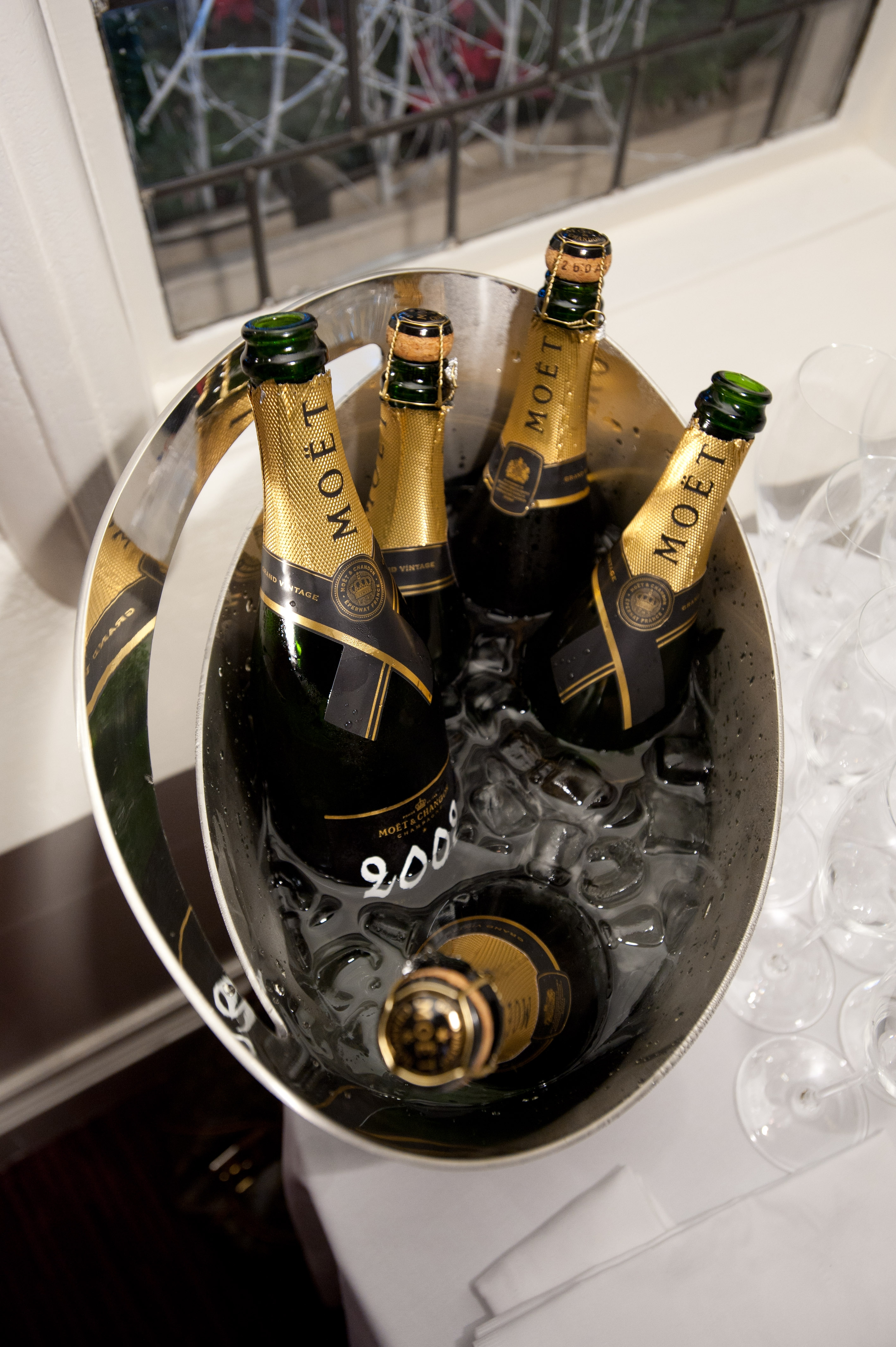
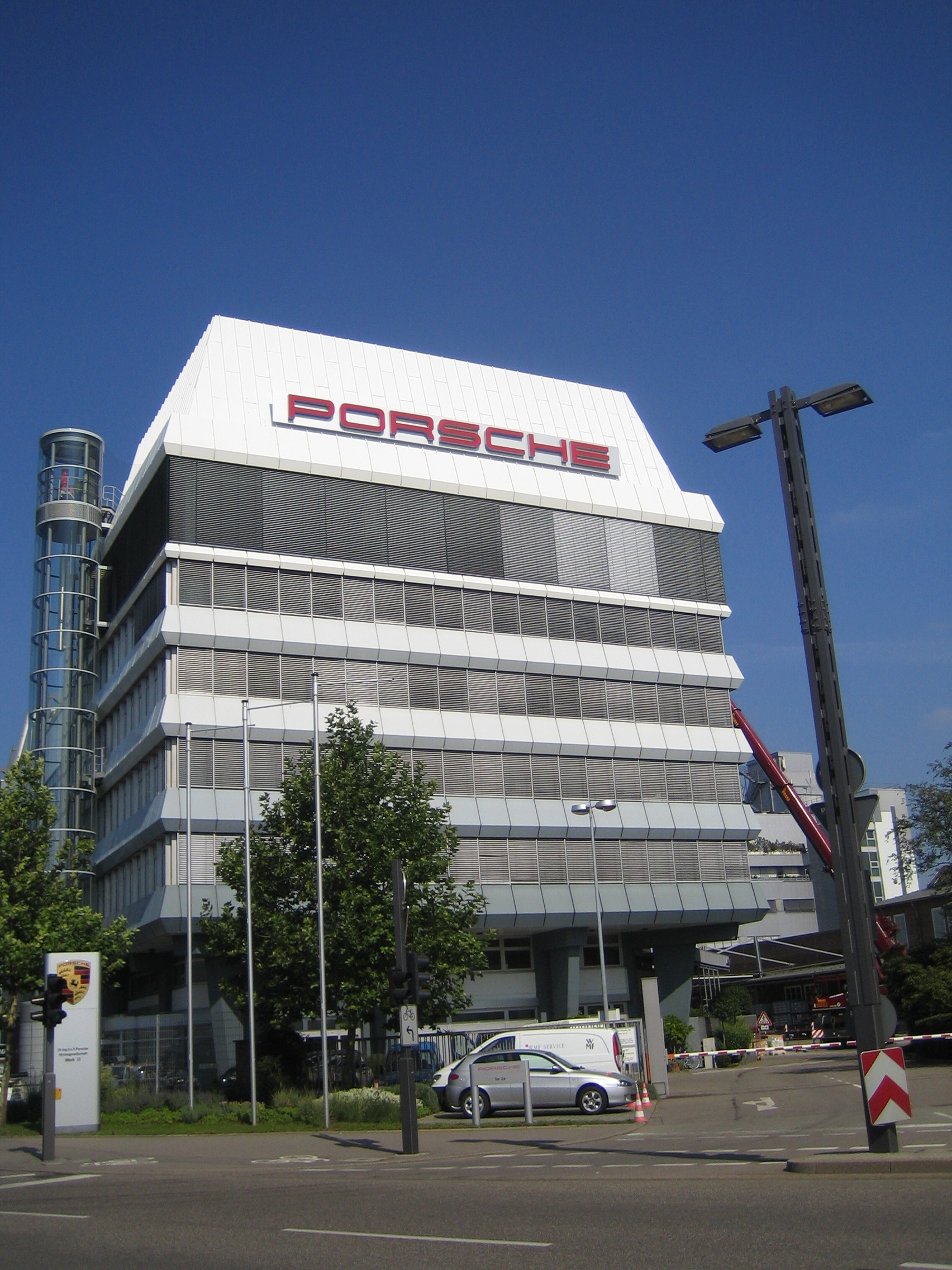
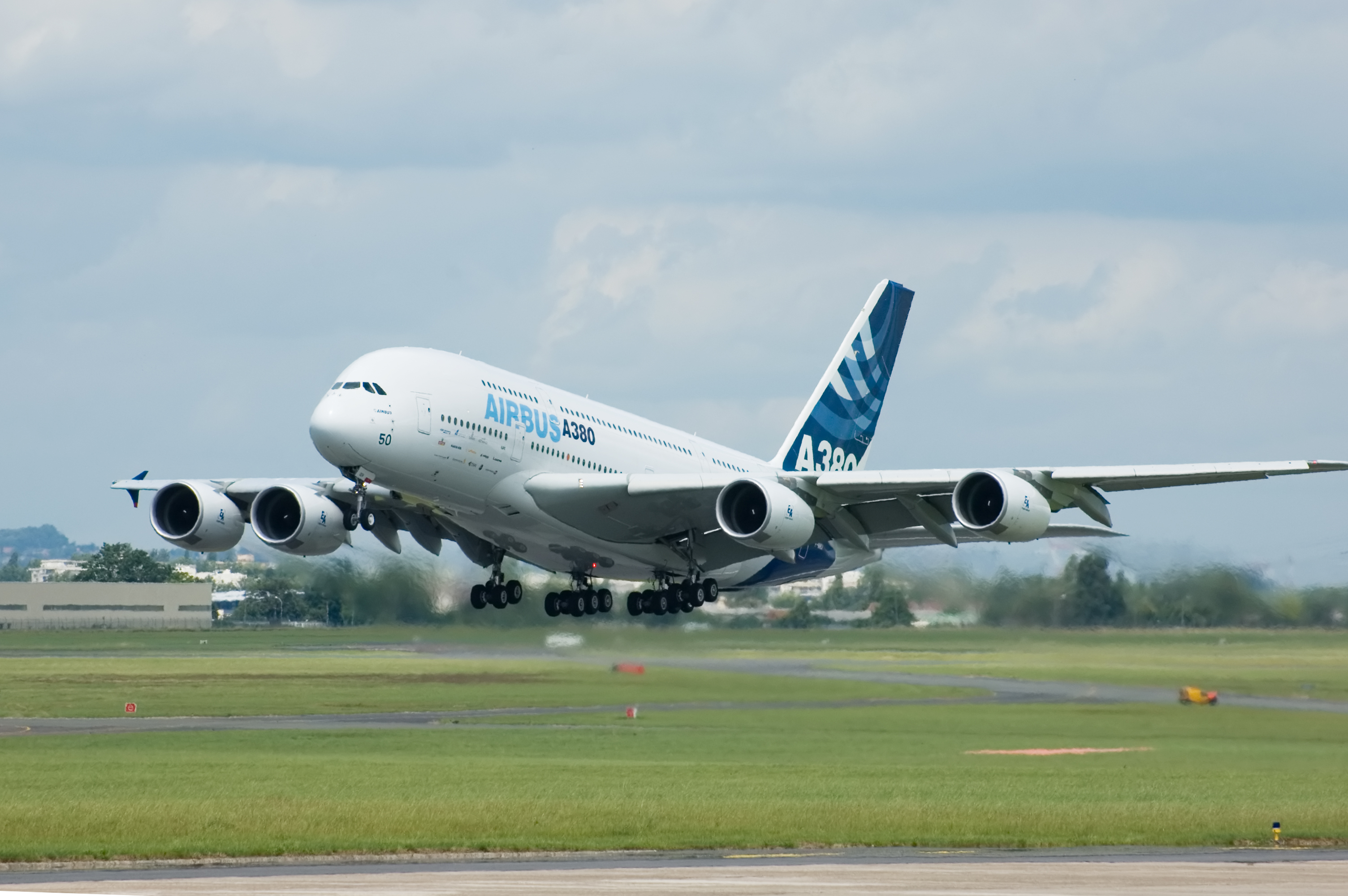
Clockwise from top left: Dior, LVMH (Moët & Chandon Champagne), Airbus (Airbus A380 aircraft) and Porsche (Porsche headquarters) are among the best-known societates registered.

A societas Europaea (Classical Latin: [sɔˈkɪ.ɛtaːs eu̯roːˈpae̯.a], Ecclesiastical Latin: [soˈtʃi.etas eu̯roˈpe.a]; lit. 'European association' or 'European company'; plural: societates Europaeae; abbr. SE) is a public company registered in accordance with the corporate law of the European Union (EU), introduced in 2004 with the Council Regulation on the Statute for a European Company. Such a company may more easily transfer to or merge with companies in other member states.

As of April 2018, more than 3,000 registrations had been reported. Several of the Euro Stoxx 50 stock market index of leading eurozone companies have been registered as SE: Airbus, Allianz, BASF, E.ON, Fresenius, LVMH Moët Hennessy Louis Vuitton (and its subsidiary Dior), SAP, Schneider Electric, TotalEnergies, Unibail-Rodamco-Westfield and Vonovia.

National law continues to supplement the basic rules in the Regulation on formation and mergers. The European Company Regulation is complemented by an Employee Involvement Directive which manages the rules for participation by employees on the company's board of directors. There is also a statute allowing for European Cooperative Societies.

== Formation ==
The statute consists of:

- Council Regulation (EC) No 2157/2001 of 8 October 2001 on the Statute for a European company (SE), and
- Council Directive 2001/86/EC of 8 October 2001 supplementing the Statute for a European company with regard to the involvement of employees.

The regulation provides five ways of forming a European limited company:

1. By merger of national companies from different member states
2. By creation of a European limited company as a parent company in a holding structure of joint stock companies and limited liability companies from different member states
3. By the creation of a joint venture between companies (or other entities) in different member states
4. By the creation of an SE subsidiary of a national company
5. By the conversion of a national company into an SE

Formation by merger is available only to public limited companies from different member states. Formation of an SE holding company is available to public and private limited companies with their registered offices in different member states or having subsidiaries or branches in member states other than that of their registered office. Formation of a joint subsidiary is available under the same circumstances to any legal entities governed by public or private law.

== Minimum capital ==
The SE must have a minimum subscribed capital of €120,000 as per article 4(2) of the directive, subject to the provision that where a member state requires a larger capital for companies exercising certain types of activities, the same requirement will also apply to an SE with its registered office in that member state (article 4(3)).

== Registered office ==
The registered office of the SE designated in the statutes must be the place where it has its central administration, that is to say its true centre of operations. The SE may transfer its registered office within the European Economic Area without dissolving the company in one member state in order to form a new one in another member state; however, such a transfer is subject to the provisions of 8 which require, inter alia, the drawing up of a transfer proposal, a report justifying the legal and economic aspects of the transfer and the issuing, by the competent authority in the member state in which the SE is registered, of a certificate attesting to the completion of the required acts and formalities.

== Registration and liquidation ==
The registration and completion of the liquidation of an SE must be disclosed for information purposes in the Official Journal of the European Communities. Every SE must be registered in the state where it has its registered office, in a register designated by the law of that state.

== Statutes ==
The statutes of the SE must provide as governing bodies the annual general meeting of shareholders and either a management board and a supervisory board (two-tier system) or an administrative board (single-tier system). Under the two-tier system the SE is managed by a management board. The member or members of the management board have the power to represent the company in dealings with third parties and in legal proceedings. They are appointed and removed by the supervisory board. No person may be a member of both the management board and the supervisory board of the same company at the same time. But the supervisory board may appoint one of its members to exercise the functions of a member of the management board in the event of absence through holidays. During such a period the function of the person concerned as a member of the supervisory board shall be suspended. Under the single-tier system, the SE is managed by an administrative board. The member or members of the administrative board have the power to represent the company in dealings with third parties and in legal proceedings. Under the single-tier system the administrative board may delegate the power of management to one or more of its members.

The following operations require the authorization of the supervisory board or the deliberation of the administrative board:

- any investment project requiring an amount more than the percentage of subscribed capital
- the conclusion of supply and performance contracts where the total turnover provided for therein is more than the percentage of turnover for the previous financial year
- the raising or granting of loans, the issue of debt securities and the assumption of liabilities of a third party or suretyship for a third party where the total money value in each case is more than the percentage of subscribed capital
- the setting-up, acquisition, disposal or closing down of undertakings, businesses or parts of businesses where the purchase price or disposal proceeds account for more than the percentage of subscribed capital
- the percentage referred to above is to be determined by the statutes of the SE. It may not be less than 5% nor more than 25%.

== Annual accounts ==
The SE must draw up annual accounts comprising the balance sheet, the profit and loss account, and the notes to the accounts, and an annual report giving a fair view of the company's business and of its position; consolidated accounts may also be required.

== Taxation ==
In tax matters, the SE is treated the same as any other multinational, i.e., it is subject to the tax regime of the national legislation applicable to the company and its subsidiaries. SEs are subject to taxes and charges in all member states where their administrative centres are situated.

== Winding-up ==
Winding-up, liquidation, insolvency, and suspension of payments are in large measure to be governed by national law. When an SE transfers its registered office outside the Community, or in any other manner no longer complies with requirements of article 7, the member state must take appropriate measures to ensure compliance or take necessary measures to ensure that the SE is liquidated.

== United Kingdom ==
Following the withdrawal of the UK from the European Union, any SE registered in the United Kingdom converted to a United Kingdom Societas and UK Societas replaced SE in its name. UK Societas retain many of the elements from the SE framework but importantly without the ability to transfer their registered office outside of the UK.

== Employee participation ==
The regulation is complemented by the Council Directive supplementing the Statute for a European Company with regard to the involvement of employees (informally "Council Directive on Employee Participation"), adopted 8 October 2001. The directive establishes rules on worker involvement in the management of the SE.

EU member states differ in the degree of worker involvement in corporate management. In Germany, most large corporations are required to allow employees to elect a certain percentage of seats on the supervisory board. Other member states have no such requirement, and furthermore in these states such practices are largely unknown and considered a threat to the rights of management.

These differing traditions of worker involvement have held back the adoption of the statute for over a decade. States without worker involvement provisions were afraid that the SE might lead to having such provisions being imposed on their companies; and states with those provisions were afraid they might lead to those provisions being circumvented.

A compromise, contained in the directive, was worked out as follows: worker involvement provisions in the SE will be decided upon by negotiations between employees and management before the creation of the SE. If agreement cannot be reached, provisions contained in the directive will apply. The directive provides for worker involvement in the SE if a minimum percentage of employees from the entities coming together to form the SE enjoyed worker involvement provisions. The directive permits member states to not implement these default worker involvement provisions in their national law, but then an SE cannot be created in that member state if the provisions in the directive would apply and negotiations between workers and management are unsuccessful.

=== Definition ===
Definition of employee participation: it does not mean participation in day-to-day decisions, which are a matter for the management, but participation in the supervision and strategic development of the company.

=== Participation ===
- If the two parties do not reach a satisfactory arrangement, a set of standard principles set out in the annex to the directive becomes applicable.
- Several models of participation are possible: firstly, a model in which the employees form part of the supervisory board or of the administrative board, as the case may be; secondly, a model in which the employees are represented by a separate body; and finally, other models to be agreed between the management or administrative boards of the founder companies and the employees or their representatives in those companies, the level of information and consultation being the same as in the case of the second model. The general meeting may not approve the formation of an SE unless one of the models of participation defined in the directive has been chosen.
- The employees' representatives must be provided with such financial and material resources and other facilities as enable them to perform their duties properly.
- With regard to a European company formed through a merger, the standard principles relating to worker participation will apply where at least 25% of the employees had the right to participate in decisions before the merger. Here a political agreement proved impossible until the Nice summit in December 2000. The compromise adopted by the heads of state or governments allowed a member state not to apply the directive to SEs formed from a merger, in which case the SE could not be registered in the member state in question unless an agreement had been concluded between the management and employees, or that no SE employee had the right of participation before the formation of the SE.

=== Employment contracts and pensions ===
Employment contracts and pensions are not covered by the directive. With regard to occupational pension schemes, the SE is covered by the provisions laid down in the proposal for a directive on institutions for occupational schemes, presented by the Commission in October 2000, in particular in connection with the possibility of introducing a single pension scheme for all their employees in the European Union.

== Development ==
Two approaches have been attempted to solve the problems cited above. One approach is to harmonise the company law of the member states. This approach has had some successes, but after thirty years only limited progress has been made. It is difficult to harmonise widely different regulatory systems, especially when they reflect different national attitudes to issues such as worker involvement in the management of the company.

The other approach is to construct a whole new system of EU company law, that co-exists with the individual company laws of the member states. Companies would have the choice of operating either under national regulations or under the EU-wide system. However, this approach has been only somewhat more effective than the harmonization approach: while states are not as concerned about having foreign traditions of corporate governance imposed on their companies, which the harmonization approach could well entail; they also wish to ensure that the EU-wide system would be palatable to the traditions of their national companies, so that they will not be put at a disadvantage compared to the other member states.

The European Company Statute represents a step in this direction, albeit a limited one. While it establishes some common EU rules on the SE, these rules are incomplete, and the holes in the rules are to be filled in using the law of the member state in which the SE is registered. This has been due to the difficulties of agreeing on common European rules on these issues.

== Registrations ==
On 8 October 2004, Dutch company MPIT Structured Financial Services was registered as Europe's first SE company. As of 11 April 2018, 3,015 registrations have been made. In terms of registrations, the Czech Republic is vastly overrepresented, accounting for 79% of all Societates Europaeae as of December 2015. 9 of the 50 constituents of the Euro Stoxx 50 stock market index of leading eurozone companies were Societates Europaeae in 2015. Annual registrations by member state are presented in the following chart:

View chart definition.
Sectors in which societates with more than five employees have been registered (2014)
1. Financial services (21.0%)
2. Services commerce (18.0%)
3. Metal (15.0%)
4. Chemical (11.0%)
5. Other services (9.00%)
6. Information technology (7.00%)
7. Other (5.00%)
8. Construction industry (5.00%)
9. Food, hotel and catering (4.00%)
10. Unknown (3.00%)
11. Transport (2.00%)

Registrations of new societates are to be published in the Official Journal of the European Union. There is no official union-wide register of societates, as they are registered in the nation in which their corporate seats are located. worker-participation.eu does however maintain a database of current and planned registrations. Examples of companies include:

Components of the Euro Stoxx 50 stock market index of leading eurozone companies

Notable examples
Name	State in which the company is seated
Airbus	France
Atos	France
AmRest	Spain
Aixtron	Germany
Axel Springer	Germany
Autopistas de Puerto Rico	Spain (Note: Headquartered in the U.S. insular area of Puerto Rico, but wholly owned by a Spanish company)
Allianz	Germany
BASF	Germany
Bilfinger	Germany
Colt CZ Group	Czech Republic
Conrad Electronic	Germany
Dassault Systèmes	France
DeepL Translator	Germany
Deutsche Börse	Germany
Dior	France
E.ON	Germany
EPEX SPOT	France
Ferrovial	Spain
Flixbus	Germany
Fresenius	Germany
Getlink	France
GfK	Germany
Graphisoft	Hungary
KWS Saat	Germany
OHB	Germany
Puma	Germany
LVMH	France
MAN	Germany
New Work	Germany
Nordex	Germany
Porsche	Germany
Rocket Internet	Germany
Hannover Rück	Germany
Vapiano	Germany
Senvion	Germany
HAWE Hydraulik	Germany
ADVA Optical Networking	Germany
Equens	Netherlands
Dekra	Germany
SGL Carbon	Germany
Prosafe	Cyprus
ProSiebenSat.1 Media	Germany
Klöckner	Germany
Songa Offshore	Cyprus
SAP	Germany
Schneider Electric	France
Scor	France
Solon	Germany
Strabag	Austria
TotalEnergies	France
Unibail-Rodamco-Westfield	France
Zalando	Germany
Ziehl-Abegg	Germany

== See also ==
- 28th regime or EU Inc., proposed successor to the Societas Europaea
- Societas cooperativa Europaea
- European economic interest grouping
- Societas privata Europaea
- Types of business entity

== Sources ==
- A. Arlt, C. Bervoets, K. Grechenig, S. Kalss, The Societas Europaea in Relation to the Public Corporation of Five Member States (France, Italy, Netherlands, Spain, Austria), European Business Organization Law Review (EBOR) 2002, pp. 733–764.
- Catherine Cathiard and Arnaud Lecourt, "La Pratique du Droit Européen des Sociétés – Analyse comparative des structures et des fusions transfrontalières", [Practice of European Company Law – Comparative analysis of European structures and cross-border mergers], Paris, JOLY Editions, Pratique des Affaires, 2010(available in French).
- Catherine Cathiard,"Societé Européenne (Societas Europaea)" (European Company),Lexis-Nexis, Jurisclasseur, Company Law, Forms, Brochures C-5 and C-6 (available in French).
- Catherine Cathiard, "Plea for an underestimated corporate form : the Societas Europaea (SE)", OPTION FINANCE, 17 janvier 2011(available in French).
- Catherine Cathiard," The Societas Europaea : positive assessment from the practice", JOURNAL DES SOCIETES, n°83, janv. 2011 (available in French).
- Catherine Cathiard and David Zeitoun, group legal director, Unibail-Rodamco, "The European Company : advantages and opportunities", DECIDEURS Stratégie Finance Droit n° 108, sept. 2009 (available in French and English, see External links hereunder).
- Catherine Cathiard and Frédéric Lemos, managing director of Foncière LFPI, "First cross-border transfers of seat of European Companies in France : the experience of Foncière LFPI", JCP E n° 1, January 2009 (available in French).
- Catherine Cathiard and Patrick Thourot, co general manager of Scor, "La Société Européenne : bilan, perspectives et retour d’expérience", ACTES PRATIQUES & Ingénierie Sociétaire, n°102, nov-déc. 2008 (available in French).
