= Anglo Petroleum Ltd v TFB (Mortgages) Ltd =

Anglo Petroleum v TFB (Mortgages) Ltd
- Court: Court of Appeal of England and Wales
- Full case name: Anglo Petroleum Limited & Paul Sutton v TFB (Mortgages) Limited
- Decided: May 16, 2007
- Citation: [2007] EWCA 456

Court membership
- Judges sitting: Mummery LJ, Smith LJ, Toulson LJ

Case opinions
- Toulson LJ

Keywords
- Share; Financial assistance

Anglo Petroleum v TFB (Mortgages) Ltd [2008] 1 BCLC 185 is a UK company law case concerning financial assistance.

== Facts ==
A company in trouble, undergoing restructuring, undertook to pay back money after its acquisition. Repsol, the seller of shares, was only willing to sell if it received £15m. The company agreed to pay £15m to the parent, and the company’s shares were then sold for £1.

== Judgment ==
The court held this was not financial assistance, because the agreed payment merely reduced the shares’ value to £1, rather than assisting in the purchase of the shares.

== See also ==
- UK company law
