= Mosely v Koffyfontein Mines Ltd =

- Citation: [1904] 2 Ch 108

Keywords
- Share, nominal value, issue at discount

Mosely v Koffyfontein Mines Ltd [1904] 2 Ch 108 is a UK company law case concerning shares. It held that if debentures are convertible into shares, they may not be issued at a price below the nominal share price.

== Facts ==
Debentures, convertible into shares, were issued at a price 20 per cent below the nominal share price. Shares were trading at 4 shillings. Although debentures can be issued at a ‘discount’, it was argued that their convertibility meant that this contravened the rule against shares being issued at a discount, now found in Companies Act 2006, section 580.

== Judgment ==
Held, that even though it was not an avoidance scheme, this was caught by the no issuing shares at a discount rule.

== See also ==
- UK company law
