= Hilder v Dexter =

- Court: House of Lords
- Citation: [1902] AC 474

Keywords
- Share, issue at a discount

Hilder v Dexter [1902] AC 474 is a UK company law case concerning shares.

== Facts ==
To raise working capital, United Gold Coast Mining Properties Ltd offered shares at par value to Mr Hilder and others with an option to take further shares at par for two years. After the share price rose, Mr Hilder wished to exercise his option.

== Judgment ==
Earl of Halsbury LC held that Hilder was entitled to exercise the option, as it in no way directly or indirectly contravened the rule against issuing shares at a discount under Companies Act 1900, section 8(2) (now Companies Act 2006, section 580).

== See also ==
- UK company law
