= Quin & Axtens Ltd v Salmon =

- Court: House of Lords
- Citation: [1909] AC 442

Case history
- Prior action: [1909] 1 Ch 311

Case opinions
- Lord Loreburn LC

Keywords
- Company constitution, articles of association

Quin & Axtens Ltd v Salmon [1909] AC 442 is a UK company law case, concerning the enforceability by shareholders of provisions under a company's constitution.

== Facts ==
Quin & Axtens Ltd was set up as a business of drapers, furnishing and general warehousemen at 422 to 440 Brixton Road, Brixton. Williams Axtens was the chairman. Joseph Salmon and another man, Arthur Way, were managing directors. Mr Boys-Tombs replaced Way in 1906. Axtens and Salmon held the majority of shares.

The constitution said no resolution would be effective if either Axtens or Salmons dissented (art 80). The directors were otherwise to manage the company (art 75). Axtens and Boys-Tombs wanted to buy and let some properties (buy 426 Brixton Road and let out 252 Stockwell Road), but Salmon disagreed. Then an extraordinary general meeting was held, where the same resolution was passed by a majority of shareholders.

== Judgment ==
Lord Loreburn LC in the House of Lords upheld the Court of Appeal decision (with Lord Macnaghten, Lord James of Hereford and Lord Shaw of Dunfermline concurring), and stated:

The bargain made between the shareholders is contained in articles 75 and 80 of the articles of association, and it amounts for the purpose in hand to this, that the directors should manage the business; and the company, therefore, are not to manage the business unless there is provision to that effect. Further the directors cannot manage it in a particular way--that is to say, they cannot do certain things if Mr. Salmon or Mr. Axtens objects. Now I cannot agree with Mr. Upjohn in his contention that the failure of the directors upon the objection of Mr. Salmon to grant these leases of itself remitted the matter to the discretion of the company in general meeting. They could still manage the business, but not altogether in the way they desired.

Next, in regard to the second point I think it is really too clear for argument that the business in question was business within the meaning of the 75th article.

The only question of substance to my mind is the third contention of Mr. Upjohn, when he said that the word "regulations" as employed in the 75th article includes at all events, if it is not equivalent to, directions whether general or particular as to the transaction of the business of the company. Now it may be a question for argument, but for my own part I should require a great deal of argument to satisfy me that the word "regulations" in this article does not mean the same thing as articles, having regard to the language of the first of these articles of association. But, whether that be so or not, it seems to me that the regulations or resolutions which have been passed are of themselves inconsistent with the provisions of these articles, and therefore this appeal fails, and I move your Lordships that the appeal be dismissed with costs.

== See also ==
- Automatic Self-Cleansing Filter Syndicate Co, Ltd v Cuninghame [1906] 2 Ch 34
