= Director's report =

A directors' report is a document produced by the board of directors, which details the state of the company and its compliance with a set of financial, accounting and corporate social responsibility standards. It is usually produced annually and must be disclosed to the public. They are required by law or regulation in a number of countries, this includes the United Kingdom, the European Union, Australia and New Zealand. They have become more important since the start of the environmental, social, and governance (ESG) movement in investing. In the United Kingdom, the production of the directors report is a requirement of UK company law.

== History ==
The requirement for directors' reports arose out of a general move for greater transparency in corporate governance. It is useful for shareholders to find out issues such as whether the company has good finances, whether the market has potential, and whether the business has the structural capacity to expand into new opportunities. In order for shareholders to make informed decisions when casting their votes at annual or other meetings, the Directors' Report provides part of that essential minimum standard of information. It is complemented by the Director's Remuneration Report and the Company Accounts. Much of the Directors' Report requirements are basic harmonised standards in all European companies, through the Accounts Modernisation Directive, but the UK chose to go further in the interests of greater transparency and accountability.

Directors' reports must be disclosed to the public, and so also serve as an important source of public information, as a form of social accounting. Following its introduction in the United Kingdom, the reports (under various names) had a bumpy history. As previously named, the Operating and Financial Review was said by Gordon Brown to be unnecessary ‘goldplating’ of EU regulations. Brown initially proposed scrapping it, stating it was important to place ‘trust in the responsible company’. He was widely criticised by charities, social foundations and environmental groups, leading the government to backtrack on its plan for scrappage. The present requirements are found in the Companies Act 2006. As well as social accounting these reports are used for credit-checking uses, to assess investor-worthiness and to gain background information on an individual.

== UK law ==
The duty of directors to produce a directors' report once a year is found in the Companies Act 2006 section 415. Under section 416, the contents must include the directors' names and the company's principal activities. The critical requirement is found in section 417(1). A business review must be carried out, though this is only for large companies. Small companies, with fewer employees and less turnover, are excepted by statutory instrument. Under section 417(2), directors must explain how their leadership has lived up to the directors' duty in CA 2006 section 172 to "promote the success of the company" with regard to all a company's stakeholders, including the long-term interests of shareholders, employees, the environment, the community, maintaining a high business reputation, and so forth. Section 417(3) requires that a fair review of risks and uncertainties facing the company must be outlined, a requirement from the Accounts Modernisation Directive. Section 417(4) requires a "backward looking" analysis of the business' development in the last year (again required by the Directive).

Under section 417(5), public companies come under a further duty, reflecting the old Operating and Financial Review. Companies must either comply with this provision or explain why they will not. If they do comply, public companies must state the main trends in the business, give information about the company's effect on the environment, employees, including contractual arrangements through supply chains that are essential to the company. All analysis, under section 417(6) and mandated by the directive, must use key performance indicators, unless the company is a small or medium company. Where appropriate, section 417(8) requires that accounts are explained.

Civil liability follows, also in the case for a director's remuneration report and summary financial statements, under section 463(1) for false or misleading statements in the directors' report. Any loss caused to the company by wrong statements must be compensated for, but this is a sanction that only the company (i.e., no groups except the board of directors or company members with the power to bring derivative claims) can sue for, and liability only arises for an intentional or reckless act, or a dishonest omission.

According to section 496, the company auditor must give its own report on the directors' report (a requirement that should be brief, and only operates as a badge of good health) stating whether the report is inconsistent with anything in the accounts. This is a watered-down version of the previous requirement under the Operating and Financial Review, which needed the auditor to say whether all the information emerging in the audit was consistent. Furthermore, the Operating and Financial Review required reports set out information consistently over time so that reports could be compared. It is likely this requirement exists implicitly in the basic duty to explain the contents of the report clearly, but it is not so rigid as to require the same font each year.

== List of director reporting agencies ==
Agencies that assign director reports for corporations include:

- Experian
- UK Credit Info
- First Report
- Equifax

== See also ==
- UK company law
- Form 10-K, an equivalent in US corporate law
