= Automatic Self-Cleansing Filter Syndicate Co Ltd v Cuninghame =

1906 British corporate law case

- Court: Court of Appeal of England and Wales
- Citation: [1906] 2 Ch 34

Court membership
- Judge sitting: Cozens Hardy LJ

Keywords
- articles of association, corporate veil, shareholder rights

Automatic Self-Cleansing Filter Syndicate Co Ltd v Cuninghame [1906] 2 Ch 34 is a UK company law case, which concerns the enforceability of provisions in a company's constitution.

The Court of Appeal affirmed that directors were not agents of the shareholders and so were not bound to implement shareholder resolutions, where special rules already provided for a different procedure.

== Facts ==
There were 2700 shares and the plaintiff, Mr McDiarmid, owned 1202 of them. The company was in the business of purifying and storing liquids. He wanted the company to sell its assets to another company. At a meeting he got 1502 of the shares to vote in favour of such a resolution, with his friends. The directors were opposed to it. They declined to comply with the resolution. So Mr McDiarmid brought this action in the name of the company, against the company directors, including Mr Cuninghame.

The constitution stated that only a three quarter majority could remove the directors. It said the general power of management was vested in the directors ‘subject to such regulations as might from time to time be made by extraordinary resolution’ (art 96). They were also explicitly allowed to sell company property (art 91). In this case the words ‘regulations’ referred to the articles of association. So the articles could be changed by a three quarter majority of votes. It did not say anything about issuing directions to the directors.

== Judgment ==
=== High Court ===
Warrington J held that on the true construction of the articles that unless directions were given through special resolution, then it was impossible for a mere majority to override the views of the directors. This was simply a matter of construction.

=== Court of Appeal ===
Lord Collins MR held that the simple majority of shareholders was not enough to override the requirement in the constitution that the directors may only be given instructions through a three quarter majority. So the directors were entitled to reject the offer. They are not agents to the shareholders nor the company. The shareholders would need to dismiss the directors or change the constitution. He elaborated.

It has been suggested that this is a mere question of principal and agent, and that it would be an absurd thing if a principal in appointing an agent should in effect appoint a dictator who is to manage him instead of his managing the agent. I think that that analogy does not strictly apply to this case. No doubt for some purposes directors are agents. For whom are the agents? You have, no doubt, in theory and law one entity, the company, which might be a principal, but you have to go behind that when you look to the particular position of directors. It is by the consensus of all the individuals in the company that these directors become agents and hold their rights as agents… There are provisions by which the minority may be overborne, but that can only be done by special machinery in the shape of special resolutions.

Cozens Hardy LJ agreed. He said that

going back to the root principle which governs these cases under the Companies Act 1862... [it] seems to me that the shareholders have by their express contract mutually stipulated that their common affairs should be managed by certain directors to be appointed by the shareholders in the manner described by other articles, such directors being liable to be removed only by special resolution.

== See also ==
- Quin & Axtens Ltd v Salmon [1909] AC 442
