= French company law =

Law governing legal companies incorporated under French law

French company law is the law governing corporations incorporated in France or under French corporate law.

== History ==
In the wake of the French Revolution in 1791, the right to free registration for all private companies was proclaimed. There was a boom in registrations, but this was followed by a bust in 1793. The law was reversed until 1796 when the principle of free incorporation was established again.

The law was consolidated in Napoleon's Code de commerce of 1807 using a concession system. While previously public companies with special privileges were created by a special act of the state, the Code allowed the companies to be formed according to general company law rules. Specific state permission was still required. Article 33 recognised limited liability for members. The Code de commerce was applicable outside France in Baden and the Prussian Rhine province, and it came to serve as a model for all later European public company statutes. The first German public company statute was the Prussian Act of 1843, five years after the Prussian Act on railway enterprises of 1838. Under the Loi sur les Sociétés of 1867 France adopted a system for free registration of companies.

== See also ==
- UK company law
- European company law
- German company law
- US corporate law
- List of company registers
