= Scottish Insurance Corp Ltd v Wilsons & Clyde Coal Co Ltd =

- Court: House of Lords
- Citation: [1949] AC 462

Keywords
- Shares, nationalisation

Scottish Insurance Corp Ltd v Wilsons & Clyde Coal Co Ltd [1949] AC 462 is a UK company law case concerning shares. It illustrates that where the rights of shares are explained in the articles, that is likely to be an exhaustive statement.

== Facts ==
Wilsons & Clyde Coal Co Ltd was nationalised under the Coal Industry Nationalisation Act 1946. The company's assets were transferred to the National Coal Board, and the company was waiting for reimbursement. In advance of liquidation the company procured a special resolution for reduction of capital, whereby all paid up capital would be returned to preference shareholders, to settle any claims. The aim was to eliminate them from the company, so ordinary shareholders could get excesses from compulsory purchase compensation. The preference shareholders, including Scottish Insurance Corp Ltd complained that they should be able to share in the proceeds from liquidated assets.

== Judgment ==
The House of Lords held that preference shareholders had no right to share in surplus assets, so it could not be said that the scheme was not fair and equitable. Lord Simonds said the following

It is clear from the authorities, and would be clear without them, that, subject to any relevant provision of the general law, the rights inter se of preference and ordinary shareholders must depend on the terms of the instrument which contains the bargain that they have made with the company and each other. This means, that there is a question of construction to be determined and undesirable though it may be that fine distinctions should be drawn in commercial documents such as articles of association of a company, your Lordships cannot decide that the articles here under review have a particular meaning, because to somewhat similar articles in such cases as In re William Metcalfe & Sons Ltd [1933] Ch 142 that meaning has been judicially attributed.

== See also ==
- UK company law
- Wilsons and Clyde Coal Ltd v English [1938] AC 57
