= Re Hydrodan (Corby) Ltd =

- Court: High Court
- Decided: 17 December 1993
- Citation: [1994] 2 BCLC 180

Case opinions
- Millett J

Keywords
- Shadow director, de facto director, wrongful trading

Re Hydrodan (Corby) Ltd [1994] 2 BCLC 180 is a UK company law case, concerning the meaning of a shadow director. It is sometimes incorrectly cited in sources as Re: Hydrodam.

== Facts ==
There were two corporate directors of a parent company of Hydrodan (Corby) Ltd, which was a wholly owned subsidiary of Landsaver MCP Ltd, itself a wholly owned subsidiary of Midland City Partnerships Ltd, which was, finally, a wholly owned subsidiary of Eagle Trust plc, a TV conglomerate chaired by David James, Baron James of Blackheath. The liquidator alleged that the two directors of Eagle Trust, Leslie Thomas and Dr Hardwick, were liable for wrongful trading, and contended they were liable as shadow directors under the Companies Act 2006 section 251.

== Judgment ==
Millett J held the directors of the parent were not shadow directors of the subsidiary, just by being members of the parent company’s board. It would need to be shown that they personally instructed and directed the subsidiary’s board. The first step is to identify the de jure and de facto directors, then to say that they had been directed, then that the real directors acted in accordance with the directions, and then that they were accustomed to do so. For instance there must be a pattern ‘in which the board did not exercise any discretion or judgment of its own but acted in accordance with the directions of others’. De facto directors are those who ‘undertook functions in relation to the company which could properly be discharged only by a director. It is not sufficient to show that he was concerned in the management of the company’s affairs or undertook tasks in relation to its business which can properly be performed by a manager below board level.’

Liability for wrongful trading is imposed by s. 214 of the Insolvency Act 1986. The statutory liability is imposed exclusively upon persons who are or were at the material time directors of the company in liquidation. But s. 214(7) provides that in the section ‘director’ includes a shadow director. A shadow director is defined in s. 251 of the Insolvency Act 1986 in these terms:

‘“Shadow director”, in relation to a company, means a person in accordance with whose directions or instructions the directors of the company are accustomed to act …’ I need not recite the proviso to that definition.

Directors may be of three kinds: de jure directors, that is to say, those who have been validly appointed to the office; de facto directors, that is to say, directors who assume to act as directors without having been appointed validly or at all; and shadow directors who are persons falling within the definition which I have read.

The defendants accept, though for the purpose of these appeals only, that the liability imposed by s. 214 extends to de facto directors as well as to de jure and shadow directors. It appears to me that that concession is plainly correct. Liability for wrongful trading is imposed by the Act on those persons who are responsible for it, that is to say, who were in a position to prevent damage to creditors by taking proper steps to protect their interests. Liability cannot sensibly depend upon the validity of the defendant's appointment. Those who assume to act as directors and who thereby exercise the powers and discharge the functions of a director, whether validly appointed or not, must accept the responsibilities which are attached to the office. Nevertheless, the statutory liability is imposed exclusively upon directors of one or other of the three kinds that I have mentioned. Accordingly, the liquidator must plead and prove against each defendant separately that he or it was a director of the company...

I would interpose at this point by observing that in my judgment an allegation that a defendant acted as de facto or shadow director, without distinguishing between the two, is embarrassing. It suggests – and counsel's submissions to me support the inference – that the liquidator takes the view that de facto or shadow directors are very similar, that their roles overlap, and that it may not be possible to determine in any given case whether a particular person was a de facto or a shadow director. I do not accept that at all. The terms do not overlap. They are alternatives, and in most and perhaps all cases are mutually exclusive.

A de facto director is a person who assumes to act as a director. He is held out as a director by the company, and claims and purports to be a director, although never actually or validly appointed as such. To establish that a person was a de facto director of a company it is necessary to plead and prove that he undertook functions in relation to the company which could properly be discharged only by a director. It is not sufficient to show that he was concerned in the management of the company's affairs or undertook tasks in relation to its business which can properly be performed by a manager below board level.

A de facto director, I repeat, is one who claims to act and purports to act as a director, although not validly appointed as such. A shadow director, by contrast, does not claim or purport to act as a director. On the contrary, he claims not to be a director. He lurks in the shadows, sheltering behind others who, he claims, are the only directors of the company to the exclusion of himself. He is not held out as a director by the company. To establish that a defendant is a shadow director of a company it is necessary to allege and prove: (1) who are the directors of the company, whether de facto or de jure; (2) that the defendant directed those directors how to act in relation to the company or that he was one of the persons who did so; (3) that those directors acted in accordance with such directions; and (4) that they were accustomed so to act. What is needed is, first, a board of directors claiming and purporting to act as such; and, secondly, a pattern of behaviour in which the board did not exercise any discretion or judgment of its own, but acted in accordance with the directions of others.

== See also ==
- Revenue and Customs Commissioners v Holland [2010] UKSC 51 (directors of a corporate director are not necessarily shadow directors)
