= Other people's money =

Other people's money, or OPM, may refer to:

== Economics ==
- Adam Smith's phrase in The Wealth of Nations (1776) Book V, ch 1, §107, that corporate directors will always be inefficient, because they preside over other people's money
  - The principal–agent problem in economics; the modern formulation of Smith's observation
- Other People's Money and How the Bankers Use It, 1914 book by Louis Brandeis

== Media ==
- Other People's Money, 1916 American silent film with Gladys Hulette and Kathryn Adams
- Other People's Money, 1987 American stage drama by Jerry Sterner
- Other People's Money, 1991 American drama/comedy film based on Sterner play, starring Danny DeVito and Gregory Peck
- Other People's Money, 2011 British novel by Justin Cartwright
