= Financial assistance (share purchase) =

Financial assistance in law refers to assistance given by a company for the purchase of its own shares or the shares of its holding companies. In many jurisdictions such assistance is prohibited or restricted by law. For example, all EU member states are required to restrict financial assistance by public companies up to the limit of the company's distributable reserves, although some members go further, for example, Belgium, Bulgaria, France, and The Netherlands restrict financial assistance by all companies. Where such assistance is given in breach of applicable law it will render the relevant transaction void and may constitute a criminal offence.

== Outline ==
The assistance can be of a variety of different types. The most common type of assistance is a financial guarantee for a loan and/or third party security to allow a borrower to borrow money to buy shares which is routinely given (to the extent legally possible) after a leveraged buyout in support of the new owner's acquisition debt. It would also normally include a gift or loan from the company or any other act which reduces the net assets of the company to a material extent where this is done for the purpose of the acquisition of shares in itself or its parent.

The rationale for such laws is purely economic; it is based upon the premise that if a company supports the purchase of its own shares, it causes a de facto diminution in the company's value in the hands of other shareholders (who are assumed to continue their ownership following the transaction). Conflicting concerns have also been expressed, namely that such financial assistance artificially inflates a share's price above its market level.

Although the authorities are unclear, it seems that financial assistance may also have been a crime under the English common law prior to its codification by statute. If that is correct, then laws against financial assistance may be much more prevalent than is normally assumed, and would also apply in many of the English speaking Commonwealth countries.

Laws against financial assistance are sometimes controversial because of the difficulties they can cause in the context of a leveraged buyout, and some jurisdictions which have enacted them have later repealed them. Some jurisdictions provide for so-called "whitewash" procedures, whereby the shareholders can authorise transactions that would otherwise be void for financial assistance. Most jurisdictions which prohibit financial assistance permit the company to purchase its own shares and hold them in treasury, and the company can then issue them again on terms that would have been prohibited if they had sought to provide financial assistance in an equivalent manner for a third party purchase.
