= British company law =

Law that regulates corporations formed under the Companies Act 2006

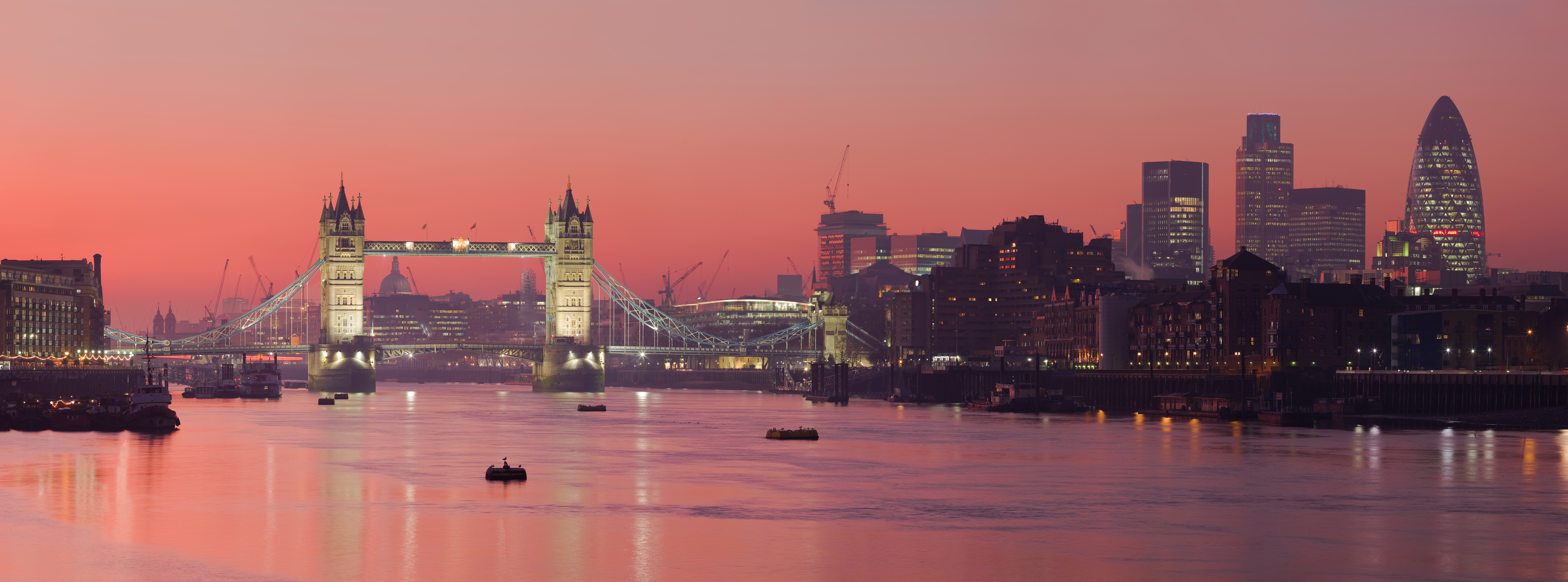
The City of London, containing the London Stock Exchange, is the financial heart of the United Kingdom.

British company law regulates corporations formed under the Companies Act 2006. Also governed by the Insolvency Act 1986, the UK Corporate Governance Code and court cases, some of which formerly implemented European Union Directives, the company is the primary legal vehicle to organise and run a business. Tracing their modern history to the late Industrial Revolution, public companies now employ more people and generate more wealth in the United Kingdom economy than any other form of organisation. The United Kingdom was the first country to draft modern corporation statutes, where, through a simple registration procedure, any investors could incorporate, limit liability to their commercial creditors in the event of business insolvency, and where management was delegated to a centralised board of directors. An influential model within Europe, the Commonwealth and as an international standard setter, British law has always given people broad freedom to design the internal company rules, so long as the mandatory minimum rights of investors under its legislation are complied with.

Company law, or corporate law, can be broken down into two main fields, corporate governance and corporate finance. Corporate governance in the UK mediates the rights and duties among shareholders, employees, creditors and directors. Since the board of directors habitually possesses the power to manage the business under a company constitution, a central theme is what mechanisms exist to ensure directors' accountability. British law is "shareholder-friendly" in that shareholders, to the exclusion of employees, typically exercise sole voting rights in the general meeting. The general meeting holds a series of minimum rights to change the company constitution, issue resolutions and remove members of the board. In turn, directors owe a set of duties to their companies. Directors must carry out their responsibilities with competence, in good faith and undivided loyalty to the enterprise. If the mechanisms of voting do not prove enough, particularly for minority shareholders, directors' duties and other member's rights may be vindicated in court. Of central importance in public and listed companies is the securities market, typified by the London Stock Exchange. Through the Takeover Code, the UK strongly protects the right of shareholders to be treated equally and freely to company shares.

Corporate finance concerns the two money-raising options for limited companies. Equity finance involves the traditional method of issuing shares to build up a company's capital. Shares can contain any rights the company and purchaser wish to contract for, but generally grant the right to participate in dividends after a company earns profits and the right to vote in company affairs. A purchaser of shares is helped to make an informed decision directly by prospectus requirements of full disclosure, and indirectly through restrictions on financial assistance by companies for the purchase of their own shares. Debt finance means getting loans, usually at a fixed annual interest repayment. Sophisticated lenders, such as banks, typically contract for a security interest over the assets of a company, so that in the event of default on loan repayments, they may seize the company's property directly to satisfy debts.

Creditors are also, to some extent, protected by the courts' power to set aside unfair transactions before a company goes under, or recoup money from negligent directors engaged in wrongful trading. If a company is unable to pay its debts as they fall due, UK insolvency law requires an administrator to attempt a rescue of the company (if the company itself has the assets to pay for this). If rescue proves impossible, a company's life ends when its assets are liquidated, distributed to creditors and the company is struck off the register. If a company becomes insolvent with no assets it can be wound up by a creditor, for a fee (not that common), or more commonly by the tax creditor (HMRC).

== History ==
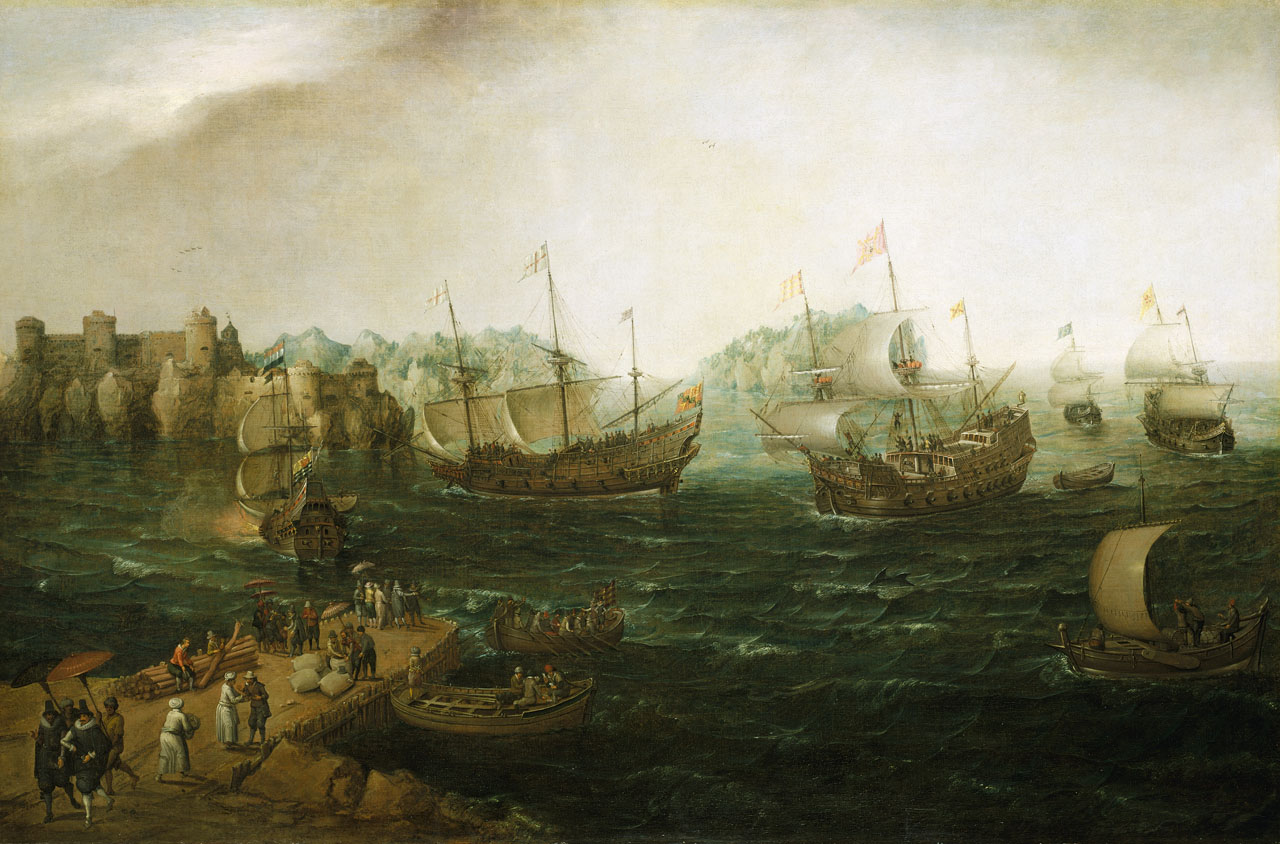
Hendrick Cornelisz Vroom's depiction in 1614 of competing British East India Company and Dutch East India Company ships, both with monopolies to trade. Other chartered corporations, still in existence include the Society of Merchant Venturers (formed in the 13th century and chartered in 1552) and the Bank of England (est 1694).

Company law in its modern shape dates from the mid-19th century; however, an array of business associations developed long before. In medieval times, traders would do business through common law constructs, such as partnerships. Whenever people acted together with a view to profit, the law deemed that a partnership arose. Early guilds and livery companies were also often involved in the regulation of competition between traders.

As England sought to build a mercantile Empire, the government created corporations under a Royal Charter or an Act of Parliament with the grant of a monopoly over a specified territory. The best-known example, established in 1600, was the British East India Company. Queen Elizabeth I granted it the exclusive right to trade with all countries to the east of the Cape of Good Hope. Corporations at this time would essentially act on the government's behalf, bringing in revenue from its exploits abroad. Subsequently, the company became increasingly integrated with British military and colonial policy, just as most British corporations were essentially dependent on the British navy's ability to control trade routes on the high seas.

"The directors of such companies, however, being the managers rather of other people's money than of their own, it cannot well be expected, that they should watch over it with the same anxious vigilance with which the partners in a private copartnery frequently watch over their own. Like the stewards of a rich man, they are apt to consider attention to small matters as not for their master's honour, and very easily give themselves a dispensation from having it. Negligence and profusion, therefore, must always prevail, more or less, in the management of the affairs of such a company. It is upon this account, that joint-stock companies for foreign trade have seldom been able to maintain the competition against private adventurers."

— A Smith, An Inquiry into the Nature and Causes of the Wealth of Nations (1776) Book V, ch 1, §107

A similar chartered company, the South Sea Company, was established in 1711 to trade in the Spanish South American colonies, but met with less success. The South Sea Company's monopoly rights were supposedly backed by the Treaty of Utrecht, signed in 1713 as a settlement following the War of Spanish Succession, which gave the United Kingdom an assiento to trade, and to sell slaves in the region for thirty years. In fact the Spanish remained hostile and let only one ship a year enter.

Unaware of the problems, investors in the UK, enticed by company promoters' extravagant promises of profit, bought thousands of shares. By 1717, the South Sea Company was so wealthy (still having done no real business) that it assumed the public debt of the British government. This accelerated the inflation of the share price further, as did the Royal Exchange and London Assurance Corporation Act 1719, which (possibly with the motive of protecting the South Sea Company from competition) prohibited the establishment of any companies without a Royal Charter. The share price rose so rapidly that people began buying shares merely in order to sell them at a higher price.

By inflating demand this led to higher share prices. The "South Sea bubble" was the first speculative bubble the country had seen, but by the end of 1720, the bubble had "burst", and the share price sank from £1000 to under £100. As bankruptcies and recriminations ricocheted through government and high society, the mood against corporations, and errant directors, was bitter. Even in 1776, Adam Smith wrote in the Wealth of Nations that mass corporate activity could not match private entrepreneurship, because people in charge of "other people's money" would not exercise as much care as they would with their own.

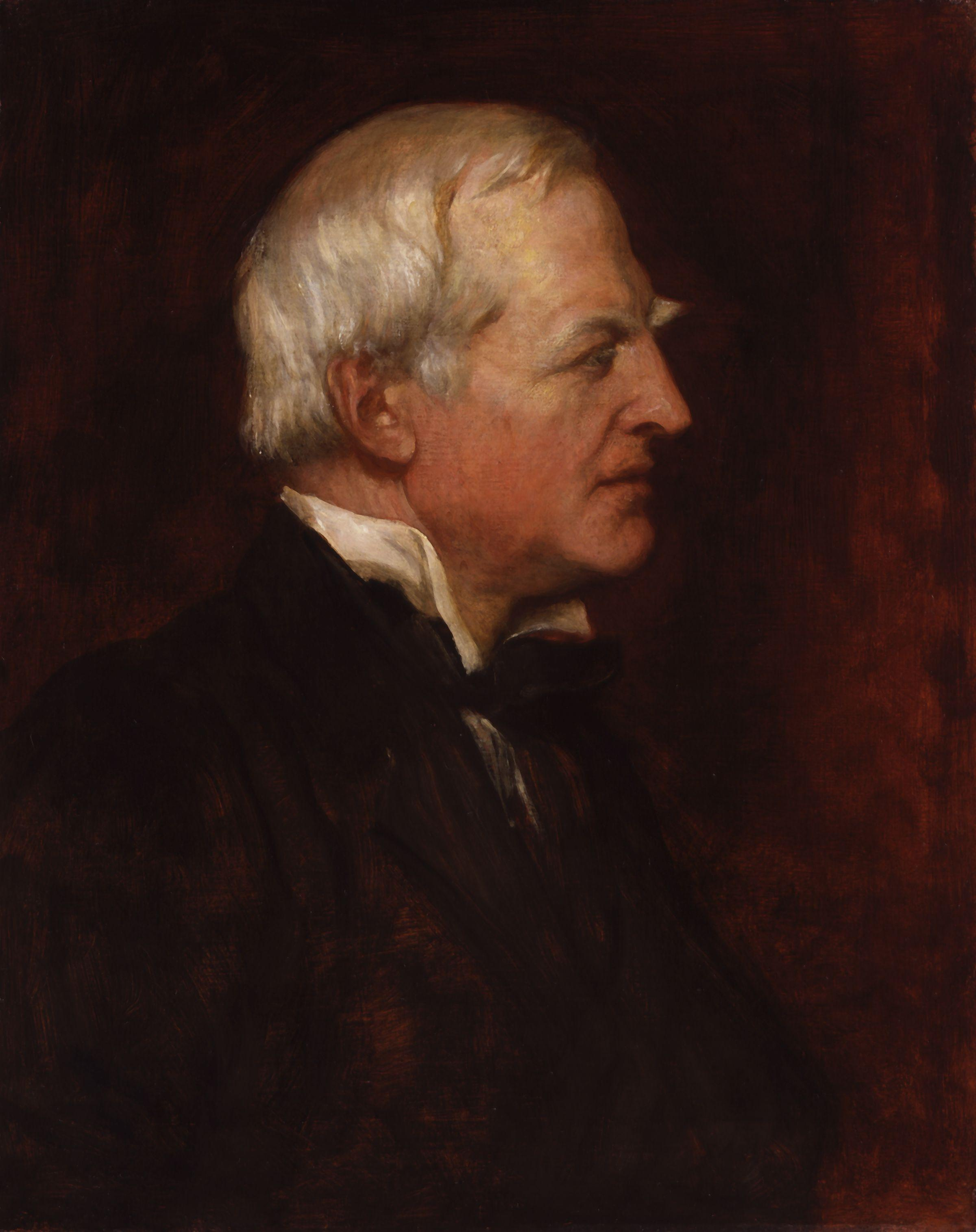
Robert Lowe, then Vice-President of the Board of Trade has been dubbed the "father of modern company law" for his role in drafting the 1856 reforms.

The Bubble Act 1720's prohibition on establishing companies remained in force until 1825. By this point the Industrial Revolution had gathered pace, pressing for legal change to facilitate business activity. Restrictions were gradually lifted on ordinary people incorporating, though businesses such as those chronicled by Charles Dickens in Martin Chuzzlewit under primitive companies legislation were often scams. Without cohesive regulation, undercapitalised ventures like the proverbial "Anglo-Bengalee Disinterested Loan and Life Assurance Company" promised no hope of success, except for richly remunerated promoters. Then in 1843, William Gladstone took chairmanship of a Parliamentary Committee on Joint Stock Companies, which led to the Joint Stock Companies Act 1844.

For the first time it was possible for ordinary people through a simple registration procedure to incorporate. The advantage of establishing a company as a separate legal person was mainly administrative, as a unified entity under which the rights and duties of all investors and managers could be channelled. The most important development came through the Limited Liability Act 1855, which allowed investors to limit their liability in the event of business failure to the amount they invested in the company. These two features - a simple registration procedure and limited liability - were subsequently codified in the world's first modern company law, the Joint Stock Companies Act 1856. A series of Companies Acts up to the present Companies Act 2006 have essentially retained the same fundamental features.

Over the 20th century, companies in the UK became the dominant organisational form of economic activity, which raised concerns about how accountable those who controlled companies were to those who invested in them. The first reforms following the Great Depression, in the Companies Act 1948, ensured that directors could be removed by shareholders with a simple majority vote. In 1977, the government's Bullock Report proposed reform to allow employees to participate in selecting the board of directors, as was happening across Europe, exemplified by the German Codetermination Act 1976. The UK never implemented the reforms, and from 1979 the debate shifted.

Although making directors more accountable to employees was delayed, the Cork Report led to stiffer sanctions in the Insolvency Act 1986 and the Company Directors Disqualification Act 1986 against directors who negligently ran companies at a loss. Through the 1990s the focus in corporate governance turned toward internal control mechanisms, such as auditing, separation of the chief executive position from the chair, and remuneration committees as an attempt to place some check on excessive executive pay. A five-year "comprehensive review of company law" was undertaken between 1998 and 2003, taking the approach that legislation should be designed around the needs of smaller companies and additional requirements drafted to cover larger companies when necessary. The rules applicable to listed companies, now found in the UK Corporate Governance Code, have been complemented by principles based regulation of institutional investors' activity in company affairs. At the same time, the UK's integration in the European Union meant a steadily growing body of EU Company Law Directives and case law to harmonise company law within the internal market.

== Companies and the general law ==
Companies occupy a special place in private law since they have a legal personality separate from those who invest their capital and labour to run the business. The general rules of contract, tort and unjust enrichment operate in the first place against the company as a distinct entity. This differs fundamentally from other forms of business association. A sole trader acquires rights and duties as normal under the general law of obligations. If people carry on business together with a view to profit, they are deemed to have formed a partnership under the Partnership Act 1890 section 1.

Like a sole trader, partners will be liable on any contract or tort obligation jointly and severally in shares equal to their monetary contribution, or according to their culpability. Law, accountancy and actuarial firms are commonly organised as partnerships. Since the Limited Liability Partnerships Act 2000, partners can limit the amount they are liable for to their monetary investment in the business, if the partnership owes more money than the enterprise has. Outside these professions, however, the most common method for businesses to limit their liability is by forming a company.

=== Forming a company ===
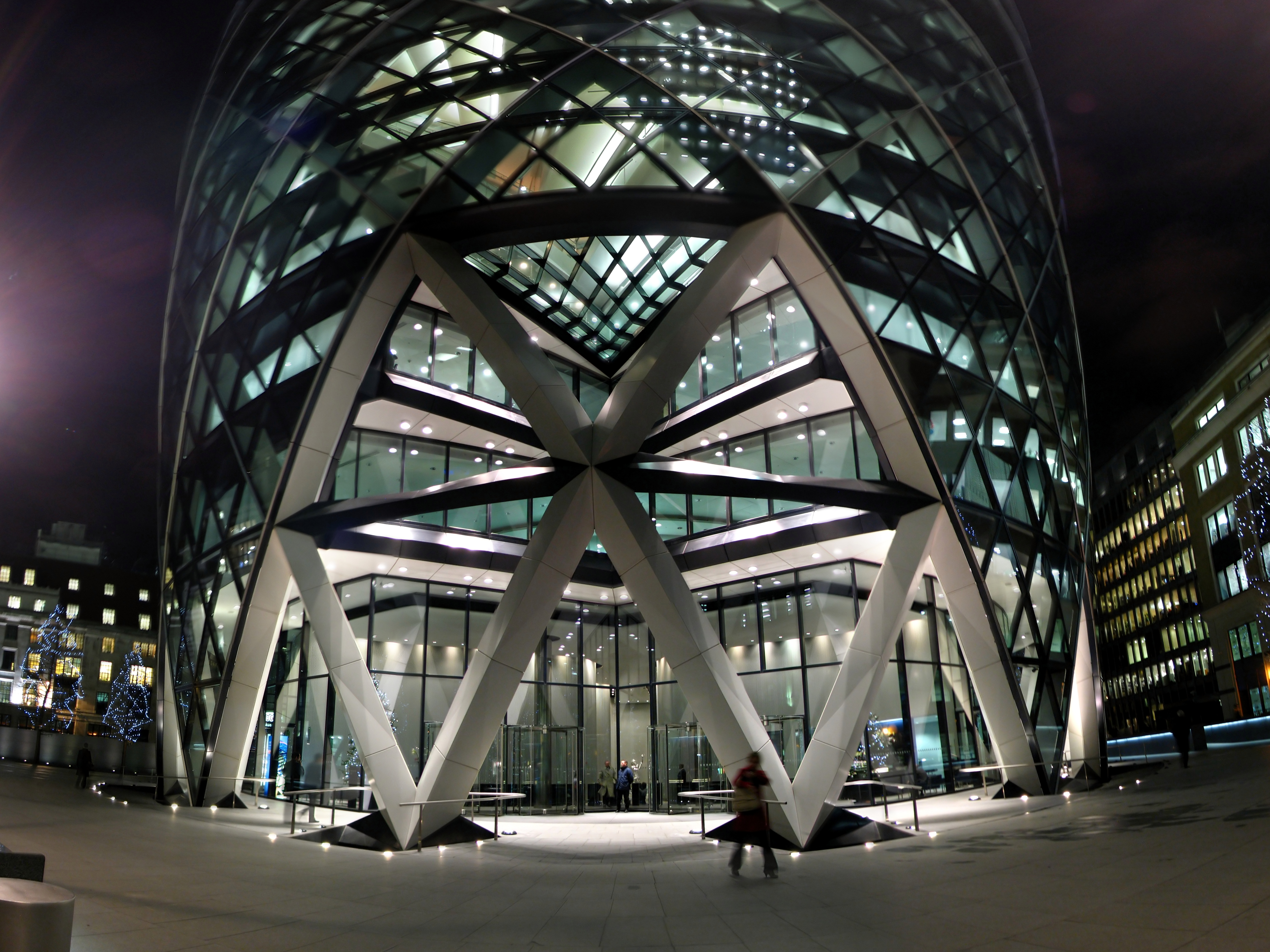
Companies employ over half the workers in the UK, and turn over more than £2,500 billion.

A variety of companies may be incorporated under the Companies Act 2006. The people interested in starting the enterprise - the prospective directors, employees and shareholders - may choose, firstly, an unlimited or a limited company. "Unlimited" will mean the incorporators will be liable for all losses and debts under the general principles of private law.

The option of a limited company leads to a second choice. A company can be "limited by guarantee", meaning that if the company owes more debts than it can pay, the guarantors' liability will be limited to the extent of the money they elect to guarantee. Or a company may choose to be "limited by shares", meaning capital investors' liability is limited to the amount they subscribe for in share capital.

A third choice is whether a company limited by shares will be public or private. Both kinds of companies must display (partly as a warning) the endings "plc" or "Ltd" following the company name. Most new businesses will opt for a private company limited by shares, while unlimited companies and companies limited by guarantee are typically chosen by either charities, risky ventures or mutual funds wanting to signal they will not leave debts unpaid.

Charitable ventures also have the option to become a community interest company.

Public companies are the predominant business vehicle in the British economy. While far less numerous than private companies, they employ the overwhelming mass of British workers and turn over the greatest share of wealth. Public companies can offer shares to the public, must have a minimum capital of £50,000, must allow free transferability of its shares, and typically (as most big public companies will be listed) will follow requirements of the London Stock Exchange or a similar securities market.

Businesses may also elect to incorporate under the European Company Statute as a Societas Europaea. An "SE" will be treated in every European Union member state as if it were a public company formed in accordance with the law of that state, and may opt in or out of employee involvement.

Once the decision has been made about the type of company, formation occurs through a series of procedures with the registrar at Companies House. Before registration, anybody promoting the company to attract investment falls under strict fiduciary duties to disclose all material facts about the venture and its finances. Moreover, anybody purporting to contract in a company's name before its registration will generally be personally liable on those obligations.

In the registration process, those who invest money in a company will sign a memorandum of association stating what shares they will initially take, and pledge their compliance with the Companies Act 2006. A standard company constitution, known as the Model Articles, is deemed to apply, or the corporators may register their own individualised articles of association. Directors must be appointed - one in a private company and at least two in a public company - and a public company must have a secretary, but there needs to be no more than a single member. The company will be refused registration if it is set up for an unlawful purpose, and a name must be chosen that is not inappropriate or already in use. This information is filled out in a form available on the Companies House website. In 2018, a £12 fee was paid for online registration when Model Articles are adopted, or a £40 for postal registration using the "IN01" form.

=== Corporate personality ===
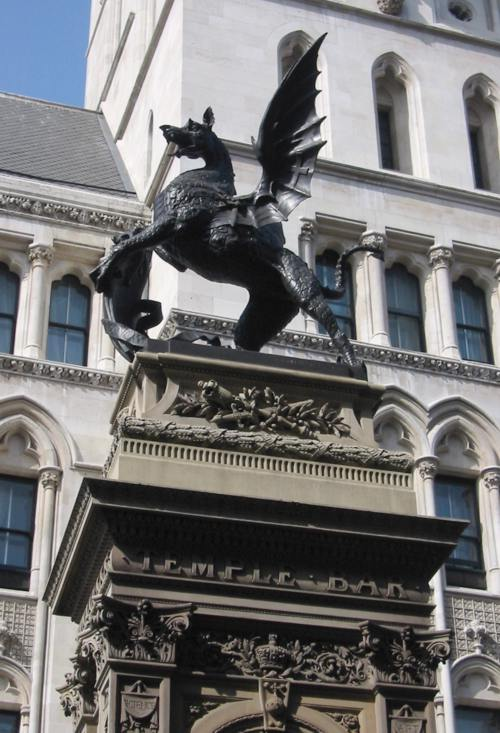
The Corporation of London, which governs the Square Mile from the Griffin at Temple Bar to the Tower of London, is an early example of a separate legal person.

English law recognised long ago that a corporation would have "legal personality". Legal personality simply means the entity is the subject of legal rights and duties. It can sue and be sued. Historically, municipal councils (such as the Corporation of London) or charitable establishments would be the primary examples of corporations. In 1612, Sir Edward Coke remarked in the Case of Sutton's Hospital,

the Corporation itself is onely in abstracto, and resteth onely in intendment and consideration of the Law; for a Corporation aggregate of many is invisible, immortal, & resteth only in intendment and consideration of the Law; and therefore it cannot have predecessor nor successor. They may not commit treason, nor be outlawed, nor excommunicate, for they have no souls, neither can they appear in person, but by Attorney. A Corporation aggregate of many cannot do fealty, for an invisible body cannot be in person, nor can swear, it is not subject to imbecilities, or death of the natural, body, and divers other cases.

A corporation does not itself suffer penalties administered by courts, but those who stand to lose their investments will. A company will, as a separate person, be the first liable entity for any obligations its directors and employees create on its behalf. If a company does not have enough assets to pay its debts as they fall due, it will be insolvent - bankrupt. Unless an administrator (someone like an auditing firm partner, usually appointed by creditors on a company's insolvency) is able to rescue the business, shareholders will lose their money, employees will lose their jobs and a liquidator will be appointed to sell off any remaining assets to distribute as much as possible to unpaid creditors. Yet if business remains successful, a company can persist forever, even as the natural people who invest in it and carry out its business change or pass away.

Most companies adopt limited liability for their members, seen in the suffix of "Ltd" or "plc". This means that if a company does go insolvent, unpaid creditors cannot (generally) seek contributions from the company's shareholders and employees, even if shareholders and employees profited handsomely before a company's fortunes declined or would bear primary responsibility for the losses under ordinary civil law principles. The liability of a company itself is unlimited (companies have to pay all they owe with the assets they have), but the liability of those who invest their capital in a company is (generally) limited to their shares, and those who invest their labour can only lose their jobs. However, limited liability acts merely as a default position. It can be "contracted around", provided creditors have the opportunity and the bargaining power to do so.

A bank, for instance, may not lend to a small company unless the company's director gives his own house as security for the loan (e.g., by mortgage). Just as it is possible for two contracting parties to stipulate in an agreement that one's liability will be limited in the event of contractual breach, the default position for companies can be switched back so that shareholders or directors do agree to pay off all debts. If a company's investors do not do this, so their limited liability is not "contracted around", their assets will (generally) be protected from claims of creditors. The assets are beyond reach behind the metaphorical "veil of incorporation".

=== Rules of attribution ===
While a limited company is deemed to be a legal person separate from its shareholders and employees, as a matter of fact, a company can only act through its employees, from the board of directors down. So there must be rules to attribute rights and duties to a company from its actors. This usually matters because an aggrieved third party will want to sue whoever has money to pay for breach of an obligation, and companies rather than their employees often have more money.

Up until reforms in 2006 this area used to be complicated significantly by the requirement on companies to specify an objects clause for their business, for instance "to make and sell, or lend on hire, railway-carriages". If companies acted outside their objects, for instance by giving a loan to build railways in Belgium, any such contracts were said to be ultra vires and consequently void. This is what happened in the early case of Ashbury Railway Carriage and Iron Co Ltd v Riche. The policy was thought to protect shareholders and creditors, whose investments or credit would not be used for an unanticipated purpose.

However, it soon became clear that the ultra vires rule restricted the flexibility of businesses to expand to meet market opportunities. Void contracts might unexpectedly and arbitrarily hinder business, so companies began to draft ever longer objects clauses, often adding an extra provision stating all objects must be construed as fully separate, or the company's objects include anything directors feel is reasonably incidental to the business. Now the 2006 Act states that companies are deemed to have unlimited objects, unless they opt for restrictions. The 2006 reforms have also clarified the legal position that if a company does have limited objects, an ultra vires act will cause the directors to have breached a duty to follow the constitution under section 171. Therefore, a shareholder who disagreed with an action outside the company's objects must sue directors for any loss. Contracts remain valid and third parties will be unaffected by this alone.

Contracts between companies and third parties, however, may turn out to be unenforceable on ordinary principles of agency law if the director or employee obviously exceeded their authority. As a general rule, third parties need not be concerned with constitutional details conferring power among directors or employees, which may only be found by laboriously searching the register at Companies House.

In general, if a third party acts in good faith, then any contract, even one going beyond the constitutional authority of the director or employee with whom they strike a deal, is valid. However, if it would appear to a reasonable person that a company employee would not have the authority to enter an agreement, then the contract is voidable at the company's instance so long as there is no equitable bar to rescission. The third party would have a claim against the (probably less solvent) employee instead. First, an agent may have express actual authority, in which case there is no problem. Her actions will be attributed to the company. Second, an agent may have implied actual authority (also sometimes called "usual" authority), which falls within the usual scope of the employee's office. Third, an agent may have "apparent authority" (also called "ostensible" authority) as it would appear to a reasonable person, creating an estoppel. If the actions of a company employee have authority deriving from a company constitution in none of these ways, a third party will only have recourse for breach of an obligation (a warrant of authority) against the individual agent, and not to the company as the principal. The Companies Act 2006 section 40 makes clear that directors are always deemed to be free of limitations on their authority under the constitution, unless a third party acting in callous bad faith takes advantage of a company whose director acts outside the scope of authority. For employees down the chain of delegation, it becomes less and less likely that a reasonable contracting party would think big transactions will have had authority.

Problems arise where serious torts, and particularly fatal injuries occur as a result of actions by company employees. All torts committed by employees in the course of employment will attribute liability to their company even if acting wholly outside authority, so long as there is some temporal and close connection to work. It is also clear that acts by directors become acts of the company, as they are "the very ego and centre of the personality of the corporation".

But despite strict liability in tort, civil remedies are in some instances insufficient to provide a deterrent to a company pursuing business practices that could seriously injure the life, health and environment of other people. Even with additional regulation by government bodies, such as the Health and Safety Executive or the Environment Agency, companies may still have a collective incentive to ignore the rules in the knowledge that the costs and likelihood of enforcement is weaker than potential profits. Criminal sanctions remain problematic, for instance if a company director had no intention to harm anyone, no mens rea, and managers in the corporate hierarchy had systems to prevent employees committing offences. One step toward reform is found in the Corporate Manslaughter and Corporate Homicide Act 2007. This creates a criminal offence for manslaughter, meaning a penal fine of up to 10 per cent of turnover against companies whose managers conduct business in a grossly negligent fashion, resulting in deaths.

Without lifting the veil there remains, however, no personal liability for directors or employees acting in the course of employment, for corporate manslaughter or otherwise. The quality of a company's accountability to a broader public and the conscientiousness of its behaviour must rely also, in great measure, on its governance.

=== Piercing the veil ===
If a company goes insolvent, there are certain situations where the courts lift the veil of incorporation on a limited company, and make shareholders or directors contribute to paying off outstanding debts to creditors. However, in British law the range of circumstances is limited. This is usually said to derive from the "principle" in Salomon v A Salomon & Co Ltd. In this leading case, a Whitechapel cobbler incorporated his business under the Companies Act 1862. At that time, seven people were required to register a company, possibly because the legislature had viewed the appropriate business vehicle for fewer people to be a partnership. Mr Salomon met this requirement by getting six family members to subscribe for one share each. Then, in return for money he lent the company, he made the company issue a debenture, which would secure his debt in priority to other creditors in the event of insolvency. The company did go insolvent, and the company liquidator, acting on behalf of unpaid creditors attempted to sue Mr Salomon personally.

Although the Court of Appeal held that Mr Salomon had defeated Parliament's purpose in registering dummy shareholders, and would have made him indemnify the company, the House of Lords held that so long as the simple formal requirements of registration were followed, the shareholders' assets must be treated as separate from the separate legal person that is a company. There could not, in general, be any lifting of the veil.

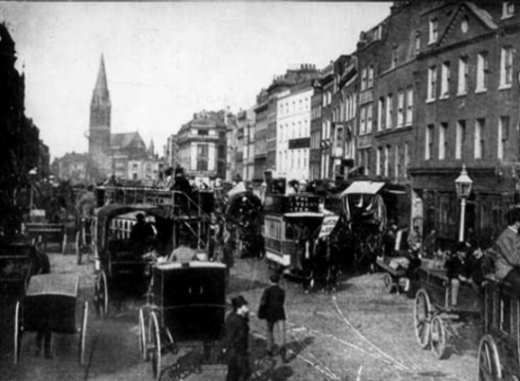
Whitechapel High Street, where Aron Salomon, the most famous litigant in company law, went insolvent.

This principle is open to a series of qualifications. Most significantly, statute may require directly or indirectly that the company not be treated as a separate entity. Under the Insolvency Act 1986, section 214 stipulates that company directors must contribute to payment of company debts in winding up if they kept the business running up more debt when they ought to have known there was no reasonable prospect of avoiding insolvency. A number of other cases demonstrate that in construing the meaning of a statute unrelated to company law, the purpose of the legislation should be fulfilled regardless of the existence of a corporate form.

For example, in Daimler Co Ltd v Continental Tyre and Rubber Co (Great Britain) Ltd, the Trading with the Enemy Act 1914 said that trading with any person of "enemy character" would be an offence. So even though the Continental Tyre Co Ltd was a "legal person" incorporated in the UK (and therefore British) its directors and shareholders were German (and therefore enemies, while the First World War was being fought).

There are also case based exceptions to the Salomon principle, though their restrictive scope is not wholly stable. The present rule under English law is that only where a company was set up to commission fraud, or to avoid a pre-existing obligation can its separate identity be ignored. This follows from a Court of Appeal case, Adams v Cape Industries plc. A group of employees suffered asbestos diseases after working for the American wholly owned subsidiary of Cape Industries plc. They were suing in New York to make Cape Industries plc pay for the debts of the subsidiary. Under conflict of laws principles, this could only be done if Cape Industries plc was treated as "present" in America through its US subsidiary (i.e. ignoring the separate legal personality of the two companies).

Rejecting the claim, and following the reasoning in Jones v Lipman, the Court of Appeal emphasised that the US subsidiary had been set up for a lawful purpose of creating a group structure overseas, and had not aimed to circumvent liability in the event of asbestos litigation. The potentially unjust result for tort victims, who are unable to contract around limited liability and may be left only with a worthless claim against a bankrupt entity, has been changed in Chandler v Cape plc so that a duty of care may be owed by a parent to workers of a subsidiary regardless of separated legal personality. However even though tort victims are protected, the restrictive position remains subject to criticism where a company group is involved, since it is not clear that companies and actual people ought to get the protection of limited liability in identical ways.

An influential decision, although subsequently doubted strongly by the House of Lords, was passed by Lord Denning MR in DHN Ltd v Tower Hamlets BC. Here Lord Denning MR held that a group of companies, two subsidiaries wholly owned by a parent, constituted a single economic unit. Because the companies' shareholders and controlling minds were identical, their rights were to be treated as the same. This allowed the parent company to claim compensation from the council for compulsory purchase of its business, which it could not have done without showing an address on the premises that its subsidiary possessed. Similar approaches to treating corporate "groups" or a "concern" as single economic entities exist in many continental European jurisdictions. This is done for tax and accounting purposes in English law. For general civil liability broadly the rule still followed is that in Adams v Cape Industries plc. In 2013 in Prest v Petrodel Resources Ltd [2013] UKSC 34 the UK Supreme Court returned to the issue of veil lifting/piercing. In an unusual sitting of seven Justices, indicating the importance of the case, they declined to lift the veil in family law preferring instead to utilise trust law. In reaching that decision Lords Sumption and Neuberger set out principles of evasion and concealment to assist in determining when to lift/pierce the corporate veil. The other justices disagreed with this analysis and as Alan Dignam and Peter Oh have argued this has made it extremely difficult for subsequent judges to interpret lifting/piercing precedent. However it is still very rare for English courts to lift the veil. The liability of the company is generally attributed to the company alone.

=== Capital regulations ===
Because limited liability generally prevents shareholders, directors or employees from being sued, the Companies Acts have sought to regulate the company's use of its capital in at least four ways. "Capital" refers to the economic value of a company's assets, such as money, buildings, or equipment. First, and most controversially, the Companies Act 2006 section 761, following the EU's Second Company Law Directive, requires that when a public company begins to trade, it has a minimum of £50,000 promised to be paid up by the shareholders. After that, the capital can be spent. This is a largely irrelevant sum for almost any public company, and although the first Companies Acts required it, since 1862 there has been no similar provision for a private company.

A number of EU member states kept minimum capital rules for their private companies, until recently. In 1999, in Centros Ltd v Erhvervs- og Selskabsstyrelsen the European Court of Justice held that a Danish minimum capital rule for private companies was a disproportionate infringement of the right of establishment for businesses in the EU. A British private limited company was refused registration by the Danish authorities, but it was held that the refusal was unlawful because the minimum capital rules did not proportionately achieve the aim of protecting creditors. Less restrictive means could achieve the same goal, such as allowing creditors to contract for guarantees. This led a large number of businesses in countries with minimum capital rules, like France and Germany, to begin incorporating as a British "Ltd". France abolished its minimum capital requirement for the SARL in 2003, and Germany created a form of GmbH without minimum capital in 2008. However, while the Second Company Law Directive is not amended, the rules remain in place for public companies.

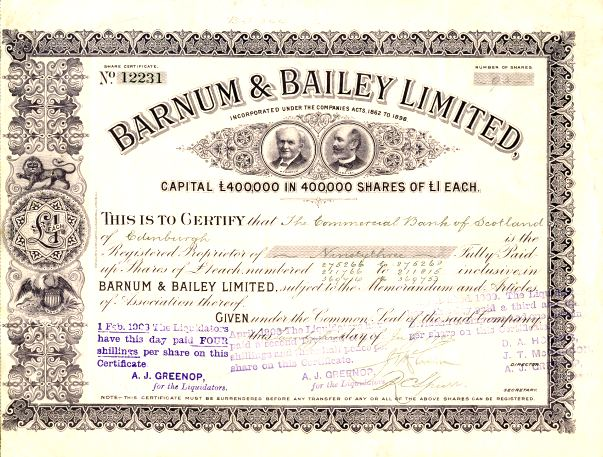
A 1903 stock certificate of a circus business, Barnum & Bailey, showing an issue price of £1 a share. The American business's founder P. T. Barnum was known for his phrase "There's a sucker born every minute."

The second measures, which originally came from the common law but also went into the Second Company Law Directive, were to regulate what was paid for shares. Initial subscribers to a memorandum for public companies must buy their shares with cash, though afterwards it is possible to give a company services or assets in return for shares. The problem was whether the services or assets accepted were in fact as valuable to the company as the cash share price otherwise would be. At common law, In re Wragg Ltd said that any exchange that was "honestly and not colourably" agreed to, between the company and the purchaser of shares, would be presumed legitimate. Later on it was also held that if the assets given were probably understood by both parties to have been insufficient, then this would count as a "colourable" taint, and the shares could be treated as being not properly paid for. The shareholder would have to pay again. This laissez faire approach was changed for public companies. Shares cannot be issued in return for services that will only be provided at a later date. Shares can be issued in return for assets, but a public company must pay for an independent valuation.

There are also absolute limits to what a share can be bought for in cash, based on a share's "nominal value" or "par value". This refers to a figure chosen by a company when it begins to sell shares, and it can be anything from 1 penny up to the market price. British law always required that some nominal value be set, because it was thought that a lower limit of some kind should be in place for how much shares could be sold, even though this very figure was chosen by the company itself. Every share, therefore, is still required to have a nominal value and shares cannot be sold at a price lower. In practice this has meant companies always set nominal values so low below the issue price, that the actual market price at which a share ends up being traded is very unlikely to plummet so far. This has led to the criticism for at least 60 years that the rule is useless and best abolished.

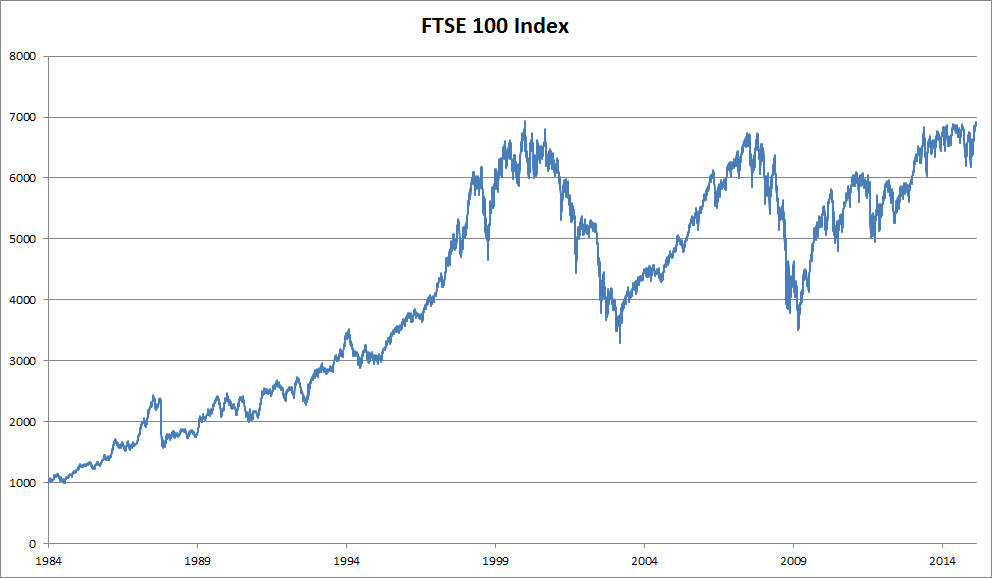
The FTSE 100 Index, here between 1984 and 2013, indicates value that traders in the stock market perceive the UK's top 100 companies to have, given the dividends they will pay out. Dividends can only be paid on profits above a company's "legal capital": the initial total shareholders contributed when they bought their shares.

The third, and practically most important strategy for creditor protection, was to require that dividends and other returns to shareholders could only be made, generally speaking, if a company had profits. The concept of "profit" is defined by law as having assets above the amount that shareholders, who initially bought shares from the company, contributed in return for their shares. For example, a company could launch its business with 1,000 shares (for public companies, called an "IPO" or initial public offering) each with a nominal value of 1 penny, and an issue price of £1. Shareholders would buy the £1 shares, and if all are sold, £1,000 would become the company's "legal capital".

Profits are whatever the company makes on top of that £1,000, though as a company continues to trade, the market price of shares could well be going up to £2 or £10, or indeed fall to 50 pence or some other number. The Companies Act 2006 states in section 830 that dividends, or any other kind of distribution, can only be given out from surplus profits beyond the legal capital. It is generally the decision of the board of directors, affirmed by a shareholder resolution, whether to declare a dividend or perhaps simply retain the earnings and invest them back into the business to grow and expand.

The calculation of companies' assets and liabilities, losses and profits, will follow the Generally Accepted Accounting Principles in the UK, but this is not an objective, scientific process: a variety of different accounting methods can be used which can lead to different assessments of when a profit exists. The prohibition on falling below the legal capital applies to "distributions" in any form, and so "disguised" distributions are also caught. This has been held to include, for example, an unwarranted salary payment to a director's wife when she had not worked, and a transfer of a property within a company group at half its market value.

A general principle, however, expounded in Progress Property Co Ltd v Moorgarth Group Ltd is that if a transaction is negotiated in good faith and at arm's length, then it may not be unwound, and this is apparently so even if it means that creditors have been "ripped off". If distributions are made without meeting the law's criteria, then a company has a claim to recover the money from any recipients. They are liable as constructive trustees, which probably mirrors the general principles of any action in unjust enrichment. This means that liability is probably strict, subject to a change of position defence, and the rules of tracing will apply if assets wrongfully paid out of the company have been passed on. For example, in It's A Wrap (UK) Ltd v Gula the directors of a bankrupt company argued that they had been unaware that dividend payments they paid themselves were unlawful (as there had not in fact been profits) because their tax advisers had said it was okay. The Court of Appeal held that ignorance of the law was not a defence. A contravention existed so long as one ought to have known of the facts that show a dividend would contravene the law. Directors can similarly be liable for breach of duty, and so to restore the money wrongfully paid away, if they failed to take reasonable care.

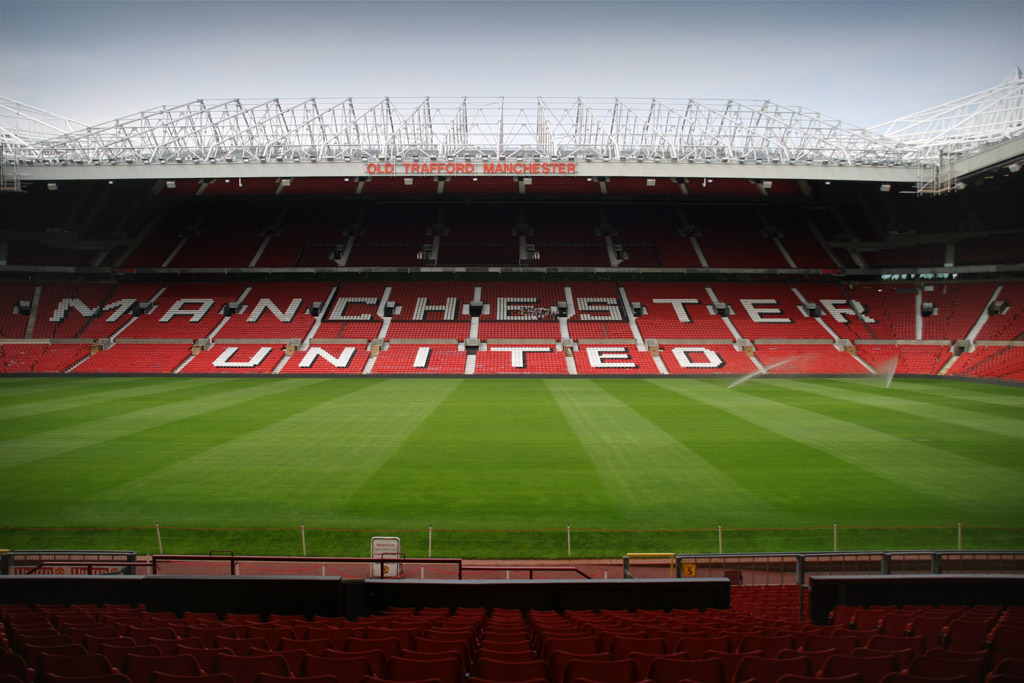
After a leveraged buyout of the leading British football team, the Glazer ownership of Manchester United plunged the club into debt, a thing that would have been more difficult before prohibitions on financial assistance for share purchase were relaxed in 1981.

Legal capital must be maintained (not distributed to shareholders, or distributed "in disguise") unless a company formally reduces its legal capital. Then it can make distributions, which might be desirable if a company wishes to shrink. A private company must have a 75 per cent vote of the shareholders, and the directors must then warrant that the company will remain solvent and will be able to pay its debts. If this turns out to be a negligent statement, the director can be sued. But this means it is hard to claw back any profits from shareholders if a company does indeed go insolvent, if the director's statement appeared good at the time. If not all the directors are prepared to make a solvency statement, the company may apply to court for a decision. In public companies, a special resolution must also be passed, and a court order is necessary.

The court can make a number of orders, for example that creditors should be protected with security interest. There is a general principle that shareholders must be treated equally in making capital reductions, however this does not mean that unequally situated shareholders must be treated the same. In particular, while no ordinary shareholder should lose shares disproportionately, it has been held legitimate to cancel preferential shares before others, particularly if those shares are entitled to preferential payment as a way of considering "the position of the company itself as an economic entity". Economically, companies buying their own shares back from shareholders would achieve the same effect as a reduction of capital.

Originally it was prohibited by the common law, but now although the general rule remains in section 658 there are two exceptions. First, a company may issue shares on terms that they may be redeemed, though only if there is express authority in the constitution of a public company, and the re-purchase can only be made from distributable profits. Second, since 1980 shares can simply be bought back from shareholders if, again this is done out of distributable profits. Crucially, the directors must also state that the company will be able to pay all its debts and continue for the next year, and shareholders must approve this by special resolution.

Under the Listing Rules for public companies, shareholders must generally be given the same buy back offer, and get shares bought back pro rata. How many shares are retained by the company as treasury shares or cancelled must be reported to Companies House. From the company's perspective the legal capital is being reduced, hence the same regulation applies. From the shareholder's perspective, the company buying back some of its shares is much the same as simply paying a dividend, except for one main difference. Taxation of dividends and share buy backs tends to be different, meaning that often buy backs are popular just because they "dodge" the Exchequer.

The fourth main area of regulation, which is usually thought of as preserving a company's capital, is prohibition of companies providing other people with financial assistance for purchasing the company's own shares. The main problem which the regulation was intended to prevent was leveraged buyouts where, for example, an investor gets a loan from a bank, secures the loan on the company it is about to buy, and uses the money to buy the shares. It was seen as a capital problem in the sense that if the venture proved unsustainable, all the company's assets would be seized under the mortgage terms, even though technically it did not reduce a company's capital.

A leveraged buy out, in effect, is the same as a bank giving someone a loan to buy a house with a 100 per cent mortgage on that house. However, in a company's case, the bank is likely to be only one among a large number of creditors, such as employees, consumers, taxpayers, or small businesses who rely on the company's trade. Only the bank will have priority for its loan, and so the risk falls wholly on other stakeholders. Financial assistance for share purchase, especially indemnifying a takeover bidder's loan, was therefore seen as encouraging risky ventures that were prone to failure, to the detriment of creditors other than the bank. It was prohibited from 1929. The prohibition remains in regard to public companies, however the Companies Act 1981 relaxed the restrictions and the Companies Act 2006 section 678, following various sources of academic criticism, repealed the prohibition for private companies altogether. It became possible to "take private" a public company (on its purchase, change the company from a plc to an Ltd). The result has been a growing number of leveraged buyouts, and an increase in the private equity industry of the UK.

== Corporate governance ==
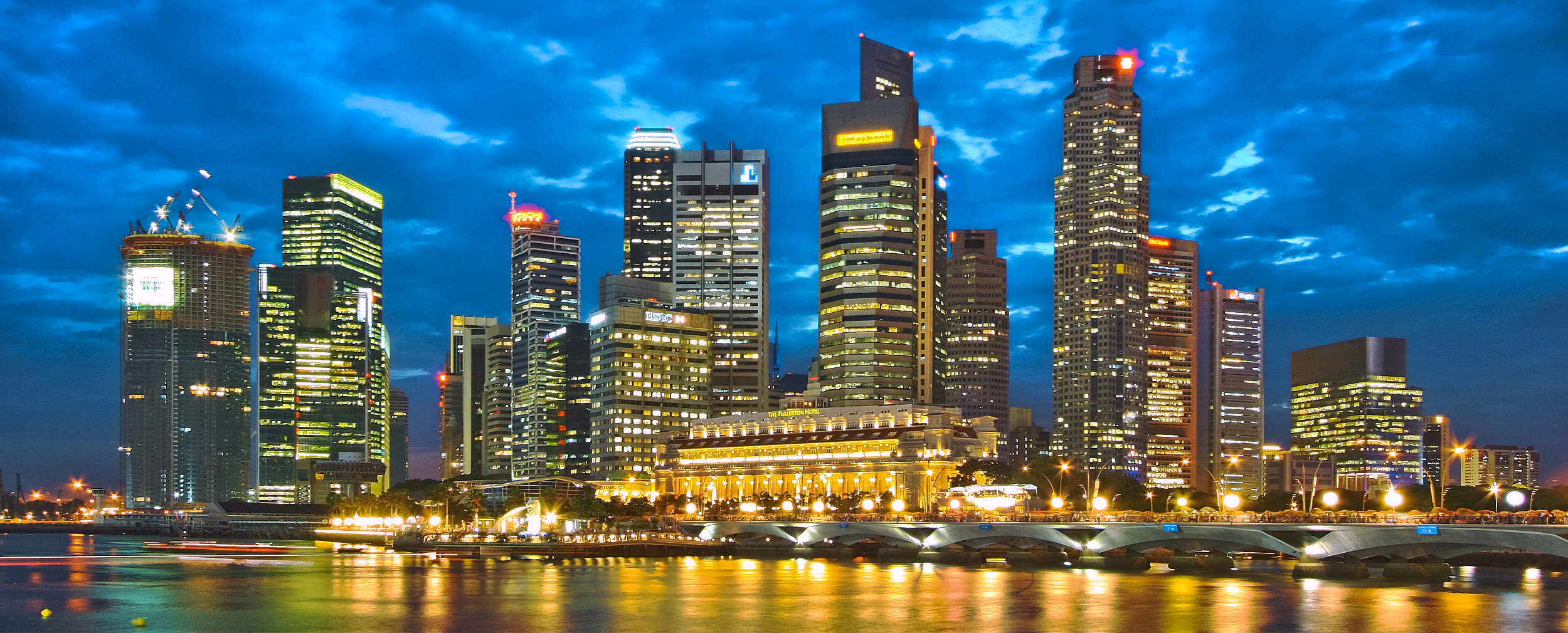
Tough corporate governance reform, the CDDA 1986, disqualified the directors in Re Barings plc (No 5), after a rogue trader brought down Barings Bank, unsupervised, from the Singapore office.

Corporate governance is concerned primarily with the balance of power between the two basic organs of a British company: the board of directors and the general meeting. The term "governance" is often used in the more narrow sense of referring to principles in the UK Corporate Governance Code. This makes recommendations about the structure, accountability and remuneration of the board of directors in listed companies, and was developed after the Polly Peck, BCCI and Robert Maxwell scandals led to the Cadbury Report of 1992.

Put broadly corporate governance in British law focuses on the relative rights and duties of directors, shareholders, employees, creditors and others who are seen as having a "stake" in the company's success. The Companies Act 2006, in conjunction with other statutes and case law, lays down an irreducible minimum core of mandatory rights for shareholders, employees, creditors and others by which all companies must abide. British rules usually focus on protecting shareholders or the investing public, but above the minimum, company constitutions are essentially free to allocate rights and duties to different groups in any form desired.

=== Constitutional separation of powers ===
The constitution of a company is usually referred to as the "articles of association". Companies are presumed to adopt a set of "Model Articles", unless the incorporators choose different rules. The Model Articles set out essential procedures for conducting a company's business, such as when to hold meetings, appointment of directors, or preparing accounts. These rules may always be changed, except where a provision is a compulsory term deriving from the Companies Act 2006, or similar mandatory law. In this sense a company constitution is functionally similar to any business contract, albeit one that is usually variable among the contracting parties with less than consensus.

In Attorney General of Belize v Belize Telecom Ltd, Lord Hoffmann held that courts construe the meaning of a company's articles in the same way as any other contract, or a piece of legislation, mindful of the context in which it was formulated. So in this case, the appropriate construction of a company's articles led to the implication that a director could be removed from office by shareholders (and did not have a job for life), even though a literal construction would have meant no person possessed the two classes of shares required to remove that director under the articles. Even if companies' articles are silent on an issue, the courts will construe the gaps to be filled with provisions consistent with the rest of the instrument in its context, as in the old case of Attorney General v Davy where Lord Hardwicke LC held that a simple majority was enough for the election of a chaplain.

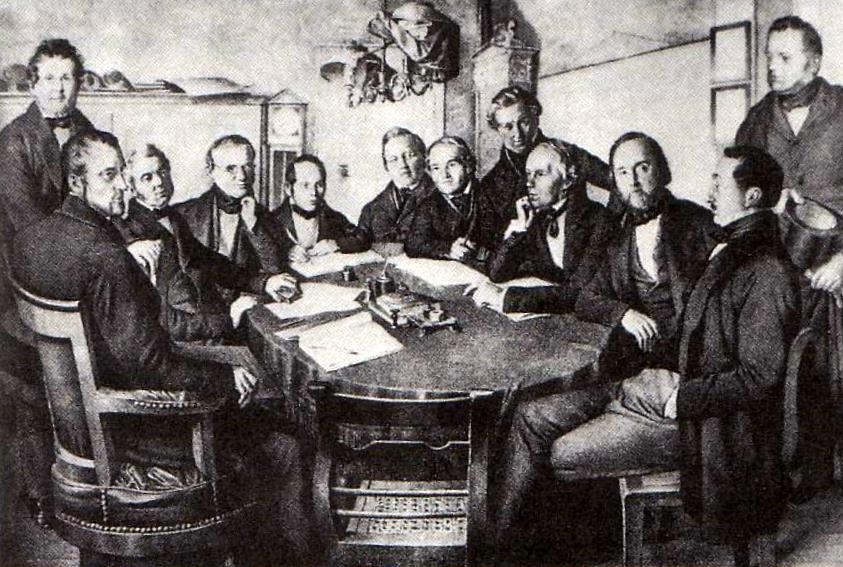
A board of directors is accountable to the general meeting. These are the two essential organs of all British companies.

Typically, a company's articles will vest a general power of management in the board of directors, with full power of directors to delegate tasks to other employees, subject to an instruction right reserved for the general meeting acting with a three quarter majority. This basic pattern can theoretically be varied in any number of ways, and so long as it does not contravene the Act, courts will enforce that balance of power. In Automatic Self-Cleansing Filter Syndicate Co Ltd v Cuninghame, a shareholder sued the board for not following a resolution, carried with an ordinary majority of votes, to sell off the company's assets.

The Court of Appeal refused the claim, since the articles stipulated that a three quarter majority was needed to issue specific instructions to the board. Shareholders always have the option of gaining the votes to change the constitution or threaten directors with removal, but they may not sidestep the separation of powers found in the company constitution. Though older cases raise an element of uncertainty, the majority opinion is that other provisions of a company's constitution generate personal rights that may be enforced by company members individually. Of the most important is a member's right to vote at meetings. Votes need not necessarily attach to shares, as preferential shares (e.g., those with extra dividend rights) are frequently non-voting.

However, ordinary shares invariably do have votes and in Pender v Lushington Lord Jessel MR stated votes were so sacrosanct as to be enforceable like a "right of property". Otherwise, the articles may be enforced by any member privy to the contract. Companies are excluded from the Contracts (Rights of Third Parties) Act 1999, so people who are conferred benefits under a constitution, but are not themselves members, are not necessarily able to sue for compliance. Partly for certainty and to achieve objectives the Act would prohibit, shareholders in small closely held companies frequently supplement the constitution by entering a shareholders' agreement. By contract shareholders can regulate any of their rights outside the company, yet their rights within the company remain a separate matter.

=== Shareholder rights ===
"...the relationship between management and ownership in limited liability companies has tended progressively to be more and more shadowy. Even before the war, apprehension was expressed on this point, and remedies were then suggested, and, with the great growth in the size of companies, the old relationship, which really grew out of the idea of partnership, where individual owners were closely concerned themselves with the management, has largely disappeared in modern company structure. The growth of groups or chains of companies, which make the true economic entity rather than the company itself, where we get a whole complex of companies operating together—that factor has still further divorced management from ownership. This now well-developed tendency is, in fact, practically ignored by the company law as it exists today, and that is another reason why amendment is required…"

— Sir Stafford Cripps, President of the Board of Trade introducing the Companies Act 1947.

In the Companies Act 2006 there is no duty to maximise profits for shareholders, and shareholders have few rights, because the word "shareholder" (those who usually invest capital in a company) is rarely used. Instead, "members" have rights in British company law. Anybody can become a company member through agreement with others involved in a new or existing company. However, because of the bargaining position that people have through capital investment, shareholders typically are the only members, and usually have a monopoly on governance rights under a constitution. In this way, the UK is a "pro-shareholder" jurisdiction relative to its European and American counterparts.

Since the Report of the Committee on Company Law Amendment, chaired in 1945 by Lord Cohen, led to the Companies Act 1947, as members and voters in the general meeting of public companies, shareholders have the mandatory right to remove directors by a simple majority, while in Germany, and in most American companies (predominantly incorporated in Delaware) directors can only be removed for a "good reason". Shareholders will habitually have the right to change the company's constitution with a three quarter majority vote, unless they have chosen to entrench the constitution with a higher threshold. Shareholders with support of 5 per cent of the total vote can call meetings, and can circulate suggestions for resolutions with support of 5 per cent of the total vote, or any one hundred other shareholders holding over £100 in shares each.

Categories of important decisions, such as large asset sales, approval of mergers, takeovers, winding up of the company, any expenditure on political donations, share buybacks, or a (for the time being) non-binding say on pay of directors, are reserved exclusively for the shareholder body.

=== Investor rights ===
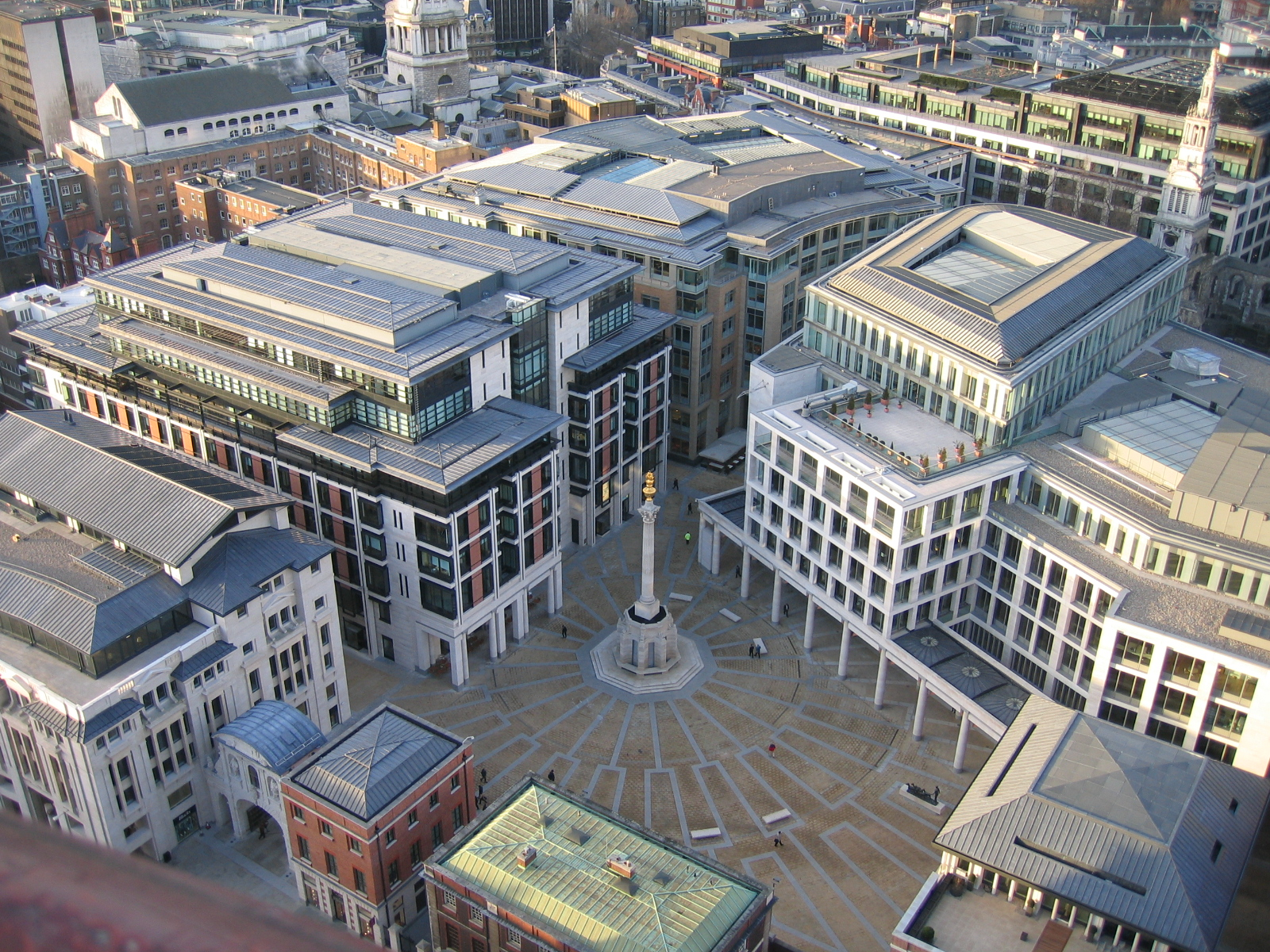
The London Stock Exchange, at Paternoster Square, lists most public companies. Shareholder voting rights are not yet exercised by elected representatives of economic investors, and are mostly appropriated by asset managers with potential conflicts of interest.

While shareholders have a privileged position in British corporate governance, most are themselves, institutions - mainly asset managers - holding "other people's money" from pension funds, life insurance policies and mutual funds. Shareholding institutions, who are entered on the share registers of public companies on the London Stock Exchange, are mainly asset managers and they infrequently exercise their governance rights. In turn, asset managers take money from other institutional investors, particularly pension funds, mutual funds and insurance funds, own most shares. Thousands or perhaps millions of persons, particularly through pensions, are beneficiaries from the returns on shares.

Historically, institutions have often not voted or participated in general meetings on their beneficiaries' behalf, and often display an uncritical pattern of supporting management. Under the Pensions Act 2004 sections 241 to 243 require that pension fund trustees are elected or appointed to be accountable to the beneficiaries of the fund, while the Companies Act 2006 section 168 ensures that directors are accountable to shareholders. However, the rules of contract, equity and fiduciary duty that operate between asset managers and the real capital investors have not been codified.

Government reports have suggested, and case law requires, that asset managers follow the instructions about voting rights from investors in investment funds according to the proportion of their investment, and follow instructions entirely when investors have separate accounts. Some institutional investors have been found to work "behind the scenes" to achieve corporate governance objectives through informal but direct communication with management, although an increasing concern developed after the 2008 financial crisis that asset managers and all financial intermediaries face structural conflicts of interest and should be banned from voting on other people's money entirely.

Individual shareholders form an increasingly small part of total investments, while foreign investment and institutional investor ownership have grown their share steadily over the last forty years. Institutional investors, who deal with other people's money, are bound by fiduciary obligations, deriving from the law of trusts and obligations to exercise care deriving from the common law. The Stewardship Code 2010, drafted by the Financial Reporting Council (the corporate governance watchdog), reinforces the duty on institutions to actively engage in governance affairs by disclosing their voting policy, voting record and voting. The aim is to make directors more accountable, at least, to investors of capital.

=== Employees' rights ===
While it has not been the norm, employee participation rights in corporate governance have existed in many specific sectors, particularly universities, and many workplaces organised as partnerships. Since the turn of the 20th century Acts such as the Port of London Act 1908, Iron and Steel Act 1967, or the Post Office Act 1977, all workers in those specific companies had votes to elect directors on the board, meaning the UK had some of the first "codetermination" laws in the world. However, as many of those Acts were updated, the Companies Act 2006 today still has no general requirement for workers to vote in the general meeting to elect directors, meaning corporate governance remains monopolised by shareholding institutions or asset managers. By contrast in 16 out of 28 EU member states employees have participation rights in private companies, including the election of members of the boards of directors, and binding votes on decisions about individual employment rights, like dismissals, working time and social facilities or accommodation. At board level, UK company law, in principle, allows any measure of employee participation, alongside shareholders, but voluntary measures have been rare outside employee share schemes that usually carry very little voice and increase employees' financial risk. Crucially, the Companies Act 2006 section 168 defines "members" as those with the ability to vote out the board. Under section 112 a "member" is anybody who initially subscribes their name to the company memorandum, or is later entered on the members' register, and is not required to have contributed money as opposed to, for instance, work. A company could write its constitution to make "employees" members with voting rights under any terms it chose.

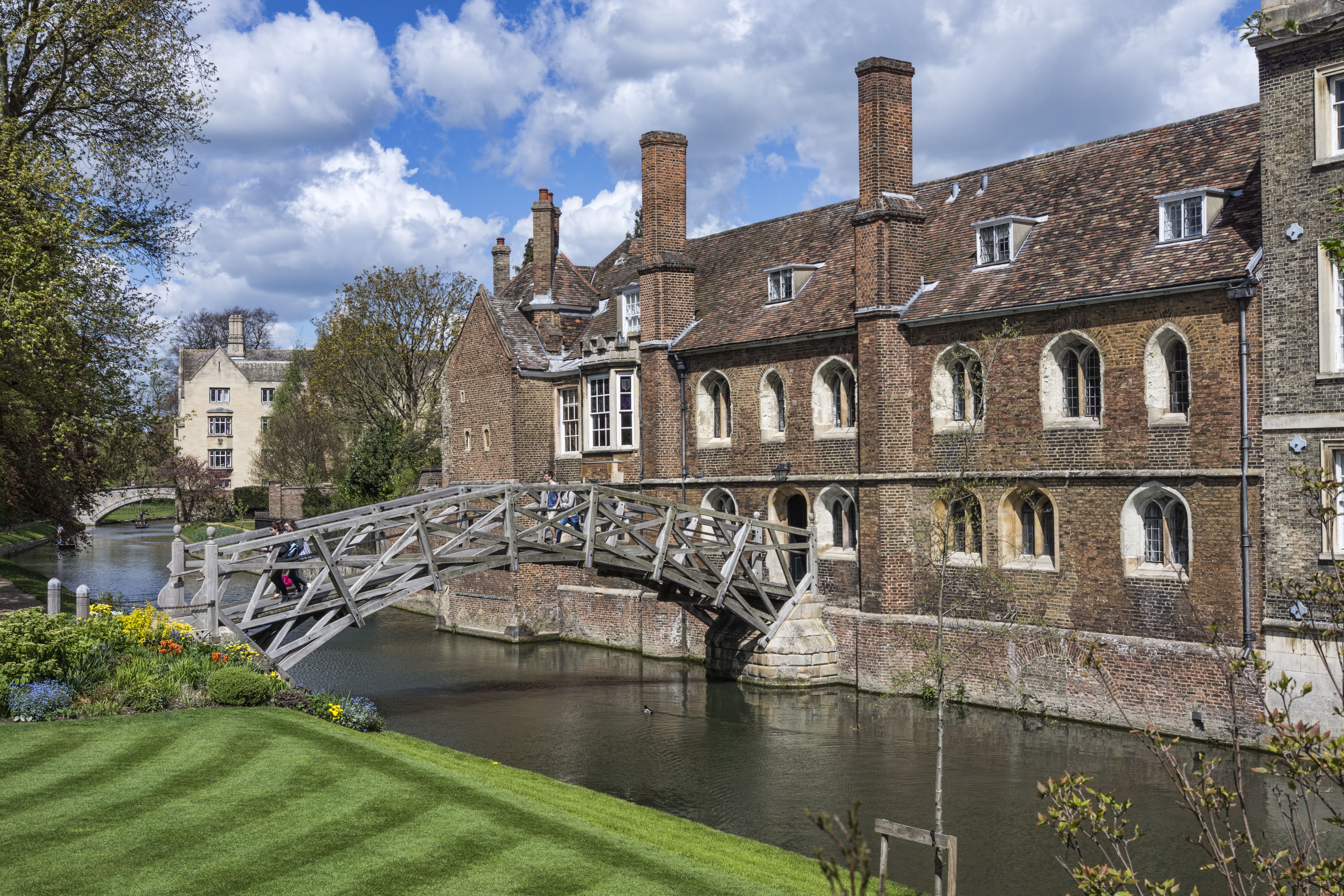
Universities in the UK are generally required to give staff members a right to vote for the board of managers at the head of corporate governance, such as in the Oxford University Act 1854, or the Cambridge University Act 1856.

In addition to national rules, under the European Company Statute, businesses that reincorporate as a Societas Europaea may opt to follow the Directive for employee involvement. An SE may have a two-tiered board, as in German companies, where shareholders and employees elect a supervisory board that in turn appoints a management board responsible for day-to-day running of the company. Or an SE can have a one tiered board, as every British company, and employees and shareholders may elect board members in the desired proportion. An "SE" can have no fewer employee participation rights than what existed before, but for a British company, there is likely to have been no participation in any case. In the 1977 Report of the committee of inquiry on industrial democracy the Government proposed, in line with the new German Codetermination Act 1976, and mirroring an EU Draft Fifth Company Law Directive, that the board of directors should have an equal number of representatives elected by employees as there were for shareholders. But reform stalled, and was abandoned after the 1979 election. Despite successful businesses like the John Lewis Partnership and Waitrose that are wholly managed and owned by the workforce, voluntary granting of participation is rare. Many businesses run employee share schemes, particularly for highly paid employees; however, such shares seldom compose more than a small percentage of capital in the company, and these investments entail heavy risks for workers, given the lack of diversification.

=== Directors' duties ===
Directors appointed to the board form the central authority in British companies. In carrying out their functions, directors (whether formally appointed, de facto, or "shadow directors") owe a series of duties to the company. There are presently seven key duties codified under the Companies Act 2006 sections 171 to 177, which reflect the common law and equitable principles. These may not be limited, waived or contracted out of, but companies may buy insurance to cover directors for costs in the event of breach. The remedies for breaches of duty were not codified, but follow common law and equity, and include compensation for losses, restitution of illegitimate gains and specific performance or injunctions.

The first director's duty under section 171 is to follow the company's constitution, but also only to exercise powers for implied "proper purposes". Prior proper purpose cases often involved directors plundering the company's assets for personal enrichment, or attempting to install mechanisms to frustrate attempted takeovers by outside bidders, such as a poison pill. Such practices are improper, because they go beyond the reason for which directors were delegated their power. The all-important duty of care is found in section 174. Directors must display the care, skill and competence that is reasonable for somebody carrying out the functions of the office, and if a director has any special qualifications an even higher standard will be expected. However, under section 1157 courts may, if directors are negligent but found to be honest and ought to be excused, relieve directors from paying compensation. The "objective plus subjective" standard was first introduced in the wrongful trading provision from the Insolvency Act 1986, and applied in Re D'Jan of London Ltd. The liquidator sought to recover compensation from Mr D'Jan, who failing to read an insurance policy form, did not disclose he was previously the director of an insolvent company. The policy was void when the company's warehouse burnt down. Hoffmann LJ held Mr D'Jan's failure was negligent, but exercised discretion to relieve liability on the ground that he owned almost all of his small business and had only put his own money at risk. The courts emphasise that they will not judge business decisions unfavourably with the benefit of hindsight, however simple procedural failures of judgement will be vulnerable. Cases under the Company Director Disqualification Act 1986, such as Re Barings plc (No 5) show that directors will also be liable for failing to adequately supervise employees or have effective risk management systems, as where the London directors ignored a warning report about the currency exchange business in Singapore, where a rogue trader caused losses so massive that it brought the whole bank into insolvency.

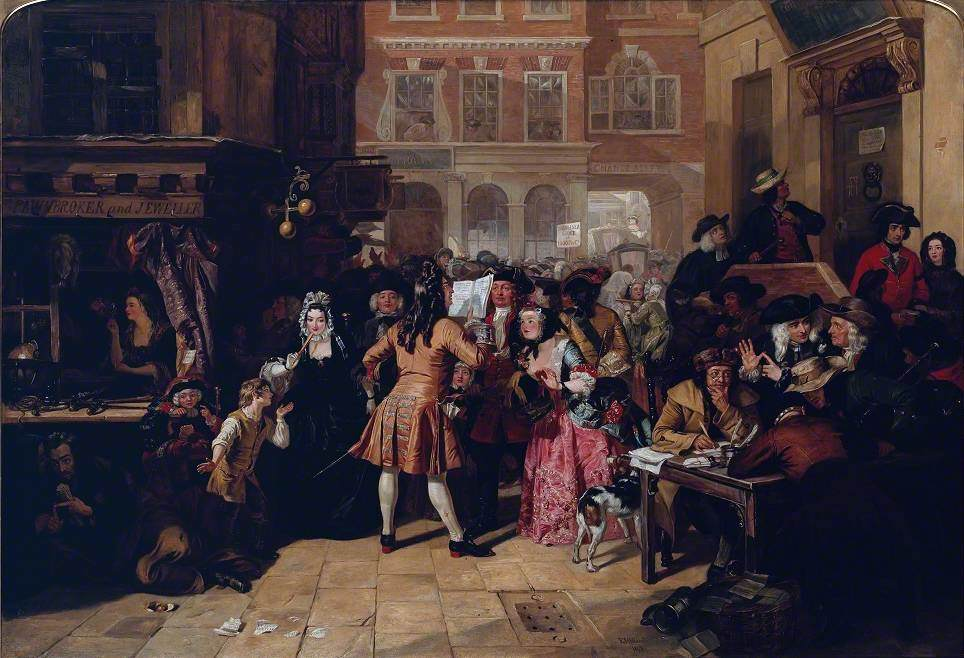
The South Sea Bubble by Edward Matthew Ward. The duty to avoid any possibility of a conflict of interest for fiduciaries has been engrained in law since the financial crisis following the South Sea Bubble of 1719.

The central equitable principle applicable to directors is to avoid any possibility of a conflict of interest, without disclosure to the board or seeking approval from shareholders. This core duty of loyalty is manifested firstly in section 175 which specifies that directors may not use business opportunities that the company could without approval. Shareholders may pass a resolution ratifying a breach of duty, but under section 239 they must be uninterested in the transaction. This absolute, strict duty has been consistently reaffirmed since the economic crisis following the South Sea Bubble in 1719. For example, in Cook v Deeks, three directors took a railway line construction contract in their own names, rather than that of their company, to exclude a fourth director from the business. Even though the directors used their votes as shareholders to "ratify" their actions, the Privy Council advised that the conflict of interest precluded their ability to forgive themselves. Similarly, in Bhullar v Bhullar, a director on one side of a feuding family set up a company to buy a carpark next to one of the company's properties. The family company, amidst the feud, had in fact resolved to buy no further investment properties, but even so, because the director failed to fully disclose the opportunity that could reasonably be considered as falling within the company's line of business, the Court of Appeal held he was liable to make restitution for all profits made on the purchase. The duty of directors to avoid any possibility of a conflict of interest also exists after a director ceases employment with a company, so it is not permissible to resign and then take up a corporate opportunity, present or maturing, even though no longer officially a "director".

I do not think it is necessary, but it appears to me very important, that we should concur in laying down again and again the general principle that in this Court no agent in the course of his agency, in the matter of his agency, can be allowed to make any profit without the knowledge and consent of his principal; that that rule is an inflexible rule, and must be applied inexorably by this Court, which is not entitled, in my judgment, to receive evidence, or suggestion, or argument as to whether the principal did or did not suffer any injury in fact by reason of the dealing of the agent; for the safety of mankind requires that no agent shall be able to put his principal to the danger of such an inquiry as that.

— James LJ, Parker v McKenna (1874-75) LR 10 Ch App 96, 124-125

The purpose of the no conflict rule is to ensure directors carry out their tasks like it was their own interest at stake. Beyond corporate opportunities, the law requires directors accept no benefits from third parties under section 176, and also has specific regulation of transactions by a company with another party in which directors have an interest. Under section 177, when directors are on both sides of a proposed contract, for example where a person owns a business selling iron chairs to the company in which he is a director, it is a default requirement that they disclose the interest to the board, so that disinterested directors may approve the deal. The company's articles could heighten the requirement, say, to shareholder approval.

If such a self dealing transaction has already taken place, directors still have a duty to disclose their interest and failure to do so is a criminal offence, subject to a £5000 fine. While such regulation through disclosure hovers with a relatively light touch, self dealing rules become more onerous as transactions become more significant. Shareholder approval is requisite for specific transactions with directors, or connected persons, when the sum of money either exceeds 10% of the company and is over £5000, or is over £100,000 in a company of any size. Further detailed provisions govern loaning money. On the question of director remuneration where the conflict of interest appears most serious, however, regulation is again relatively light. Directors pay themselves by default, but in large listed companies have pay set by a remuneration committee of directors. Under section 439, shareholders may cast a vote on remuneration but this "say on pay", as yet, is not binding.

Under section 172 directors must "promote the success of the company". This somewhat nebulous provision created significant debate during its passage through Parliament, since it goes on to prescribe that decisions should be taken in the interests of members, with regard to long term consequences, the need to act fairly between members, and a range of other "stakeholders", such as employees, suppliers, the environment, the general community, and creditors. Many groups objected to this "enlightened shareholder value" model, which in form elevated the interests of members, who are invariably shareholders, above other stakeholders. However, the duty is particularly difficult to sue upon since it is only a duty for a director to do what she or "he considers, in good faith, would be most likely to promote the success of the company". Proof of subjective bad faith toward any group being difficult, directors have the discretion to balance all competing interests, even if to the short term detriment of shareholders in a particular instance. There is also a duty under section 173 to exercise independent judgement and the duty of care in section 174 applies to the decision-making process of a director having regard to the factors listed in section 172, so it remains theoretically possible to challenge a decision if made without any rational basis. Only registered shareholders, not other stakeholders without being members of the general meeting, have standing to claim any breach of the provision. But section 172's criteria are useful as an aspirational standard because in the annual Director's Report companies must explain how they have complied with their duties to stakeholders. Also, the idea of whether a company's success will be promoted is central when a court determines whether a derivative claim should proceed in the course of corporate litigation.

=== Corporate litigation ===
Litigation among those within a company has historically been very restricted in British law. The attitude of courts favoured non-interference. As Lord Eldon said in the old case of Carlen v Drury, "This Court is not required on every Occasion to take the Management of every Playhouse and Brewhouse in the Kingdom." If there were disagreements between the directors and shareholders about whether to pursue a claim, this was thought to be a question best left for the rules of internal management in a company's constitution, since litigation could legitimately be seen as costly or distracting from doing the company's real business. The board of directors invariably holds the right to sue in the company's name as a general power of management. So if wrongs were alleged to have been done to the company, the principle from the case of Foss v Harbottle, was that the company itself was the proper claimant, and it followed that as a general rule that only the board could bring claims in court. A majority of shareholders would also have the default right to start litigation, but the interest a minority shareholder had was seen as relative to the wishes of the majority. Aggrieved minorities could not, in general, sue. Only if the alleged wrongdoers were themselves in control, as directors or majority shareholder, would the courts allow an exception for a minority shareholder to derive the right from the company to launch a claim.

Derivative claims are used by shareholders against directors alleged to have breached their duties of care or loyalty, exemplified in current litigation against BP executives for losses connected to the Deepwater Horizon oil spill catastrophe.

In practice very few derivative claims were successfully brought, given the complexity and narrowness in the exceptions to the rule in Foss v Harbottle. This was witnessed by the fact that successful cases on directors' duties before the Companies Act 2006 seldom involved minority shareholders, rather than a new board, or a liquidator in the shoes of an insolvent company, suing former directors. The new requirements to bring a "derivative claim" are now codified in the Companies Act 2006 sections 261–264. Section 260 stipulates that such actions are concerned with suing directors for breach of a duty owed to the company. Under section 261 a shareholder must, first, show the court there is a good prima facie case to be made. This preliminary legal question is followed by the substantive questions in section 263. The court must refuse permission for the claim if the alleged breach has already been validly authorised or ratified by disinterested shareholders, or if it appears that allowing litigation would undermine the company's success by the criteria laid out in section 172. If none of these "negative" criteria are fulfilled, the court then weighs up seven "positive" criteria. Again it asks whether, under the guidelines in section 172, allowing the action to continue would promote the company's success. It also asks whether the claimant is acting in good faith, whether the claimant could start an action in her own name, whether authorisation or ratification has happened or is likely to, and pays particular regard to the views of the independent and disinterested shareholders. This represented a shift from, and a replacement of, the complex pre-2006 position, by giving courts more discretion to allow meritorious claims. Still, the first cases showed the courts remaining conservative. In other respects the law remains the same. According to Wallersteiner v Moir (No 2), minority shareholders will be indemnified for the costs of a derivative claim by the company, even if it ultimately fails.

While derivative claims mean suing in the company's name, a minority shareholder can sue in her own name in four ways. The first is to claim a "personal right" under the constitution or the general law is breached. If a shareholder brings a personal action to vindicate a personal right (such as the right to not be misled by company circulars) the principle against double recovery dictates that one cannot sue for damages if the loss an individual shareholder suffers is merely the same as will be reflected in the reduction of the share value. For losses reflective of the company's, only a derivative claim may be brought. The second is to show that a company's articles were amended in an objectively unjustifiably and directly discriminatory fashion. This residual protection for minorities was developed by the Court of Appeal in Allen v Gold Reefs of West Africa Ltd, where Sir Nathaniel Lindley MR held that shareholders may amend a constitution by the required majority so long as it is "bona fide for the benefit of the company as a whole". This constraint is not heavy, as it can mean that a constitutional amendment, while applying in a formally equal way to all shareholders, has a negative and disparate impact on only one shareholder. This was so in Greenhalgh v Arderne Cinemas Ltd, where the articles were changed to remove all shareholders' pre-emption rights, but only one shareholder (the claimant, Mr Greenhalgh, who lost) was interested in preventing share sales to outside parties. This slim set of protections for minority shareholders was, until 1985, complemented only by a third, and drastic right of a shareholder, now under the Insolvency Act 1986 section 122(1)(g), to show it is "just and equitable" for a company to be liquidated. In Ebrahimi v Westbourne Galleries Ltd, Lord Wilberforce held that a court would use its discretion to wind up a company if three criteria were fulfilled: that the company was a small "quasi-partnership" founded on mutual confidence of the corporators, that shareholders participate in the business, and there are restrictions in the constitution on free transfer of shares. Given these features, it may be just and equitable to wind up a company if the court sees an agreement just short of a contract, or some other "equitable consideration", that one party has not fulfilled. So where Mr Ebrahmi, a minority shareholder, had been removed from the board, and the other two directors paid all company profits out as director salaries, rather than dividends to exclude him, the House of Lords regarded it as equitable to liquidate the company and distribute his share of the sale proceeds to Mr Ebrahimi.

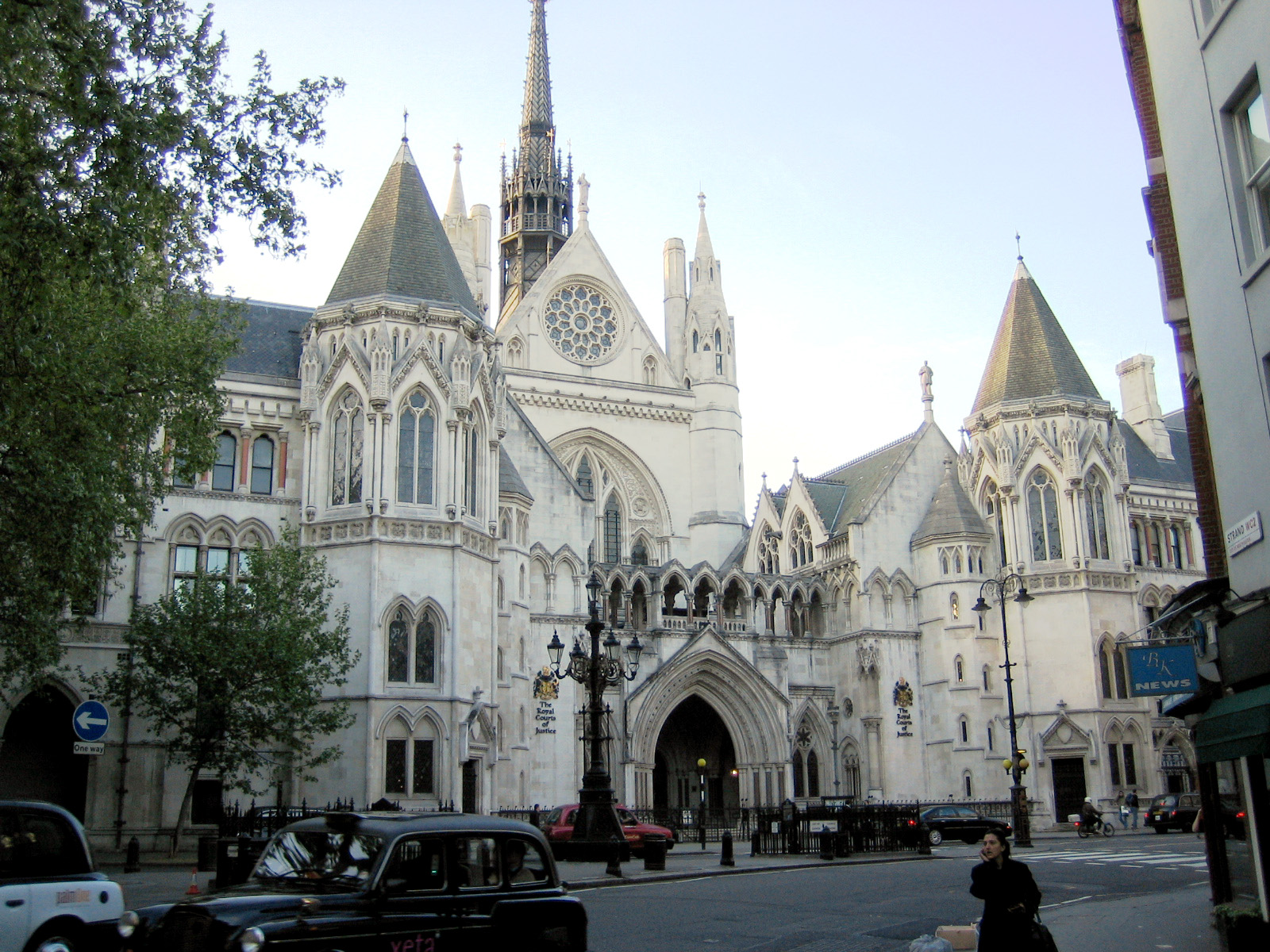
The most numerous type of case in company litigation involves unfair prejudice petitions in closely held businesses.

The drastic remedy of liquidation was mitigated significantly as the unfair prejudice action was introduced by the Companies Act 1985. Now under the Companies Act 2006 section 996, a court can grant any remedy, but will often simply require that a minority shareholder's interest is bought out by the majority at a fair value. The cause of action, stated in section 994, is very broad. A shareholder must simply allege they have been prejudiced (i.e. their interests as a member have been harmed) in a way that is unfair. "Unfairness" is now given a minimum meaning identical to that in Ebrahimi v Westbourne Galleries Ltd. A court must at least have an "equitable consideration" to grant a remedy. Generally this will refer to an agreement between two or more corporators in a small business that is just short of being an enforceable contract, for the lack of legal consideration. A clear assurance, on which a corporator relies, which would be inequitable to go back on, would suffice, unlike the facts of the leading case, O'Neill v Phillips. Here Mr O'Neill had been a prodigy in Mr Phillips' asbestos stripping business, and took on a greater and greater role until economic difficulties struck. Mr O'Neill was then demoted, but claimed that he should be given 50 per cent of the company's shares because negotiations had started for this to happen and Mr Phillips had said one day it might. Lord Hoffmann held that the vague aspiration that it "might" was not enough here: there was no concrete assurance or promise given, and so no unfairness in Mr Phillips' recanting. Unfair prejudice in this sense is an action not well suited to public companies, when the alleged obligations binding the company were potentially undisclosed to public investors in the constitution, since this would undermine the principle of transparency. However it is plain that minority shareholders can also bring claims for more serious breaches of obligation, such as breach of directors' duties. Unfair prejudice petitions remain most prevalent in small companies, and are the most numerous form of dispute to enter company courts. But if to hold directors accountable dispersed shareholders do not engage through voting, or through litigation, companies may be ripe for takeover.

== Corporate finance and markets ==
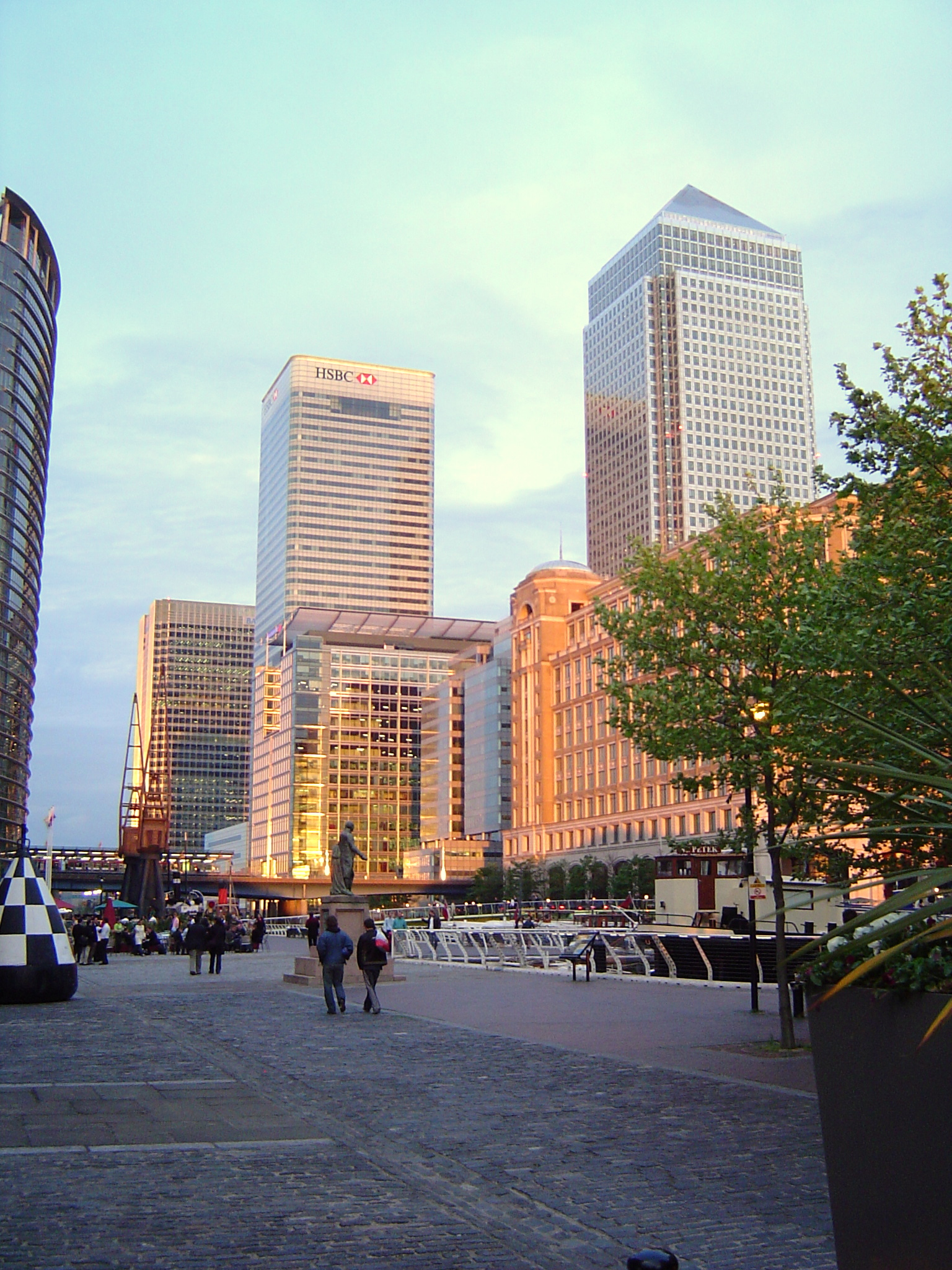
London's new central business district, Canary Wharf was formerly a major centre of the world's shipping trade at West India Quay.

While corporate governance primarily concerns the general relative rights and duties of shareholders, employees and directors in terms of administration and accountability, corporate finance concerns how the monetary or capital stake of shareholders and creditors are mediated, given the risk that the business may fail and become insolvent. Companies can fund their operations either through debt (i.e. loans) or equity (i.e. shares). In return for loans, typically from a bank, companies will often be required by contract to give their creditors a security interest over the company's assets, so that in the event of insolvency, the creditor may take the secured asset. The Insolvency Act 1986 limits powerful creditors ability to sweep up all company assets as security, particularly through a floating charge, in favour of vulnerable creditors, such as employees or consumers. If money is raised by offering shares, the shareholders' relations are determined as a group by the provisions under the constitution. The law requires disclosure of all material facts in promotions, and prospectuses. Company constitutions typically require that existing shareholders have a pre-emption right, to buy newly issued shares before outside shareholders and thus avoid their stake and control becoming diluted. Actual rights are determined by ordinary principles of construction of the company constitution. A host of rules exist to ensure that the company's capital (i.e. the amount that shareholders paid in when they bought their shares) is maintained for the benefit of creditors. Money is typically distributed to shareholders through dividends as the reward for investment. These should only come out of profits, or surpluses beyond the capital account. If companies pay out money to shareholders which in effect is a dividend "disguised" as something else, directors will be liable for repayment. Companies may reduce their capital to a lower figure if directors of private companies warrant solvency, or courts approve a public company's reduction. Because a company buying back shares from shareholders in itself, or taking back redeemable shares, has the same effect as a reduction of capital, similar transparency and procedural requirements need to be fulfilled. Public companies are also precluded from giving financial assistance for purchase of their shares, for example through a leveraged buyout, unless the company is delisted and or taken private. Finally, in order to protect investors from being placed at an unfair disadvantage, people inside a company are under a strict duty to not trade on any information that could affect a company's share price for their own benefit.

=== Debt finance ===
- Corporate bonds to raise capital, determined by contract
- Priorities on insolvency through security, IA 1986 ss 40, 115, 175, 176A, 386, Sch 6 and SI 2003/2097
- Fixed charge and floating charge, Re Spectrum Plus Ltd [2005] UKHL 41
- Registration of charges, CA 2006 ss 738, 860-877

=== Equity finance ===
Companies limited by shares also acquire finance through 'equity' (a synonym for the share capital). Shares differ from debt in that shareholders rank last in insolvency. The main justification for shareholders' residual claim is that, unlike many creditors (though not large banks) they are capable of diversifying their portfolio. Taxation of profits on shares can also be treated differently with a different tax rate (under the Income Tax Act 2007) to capital gains tax on debt (which falls under the Taxation of Chargeable Gains Act 1992). This makes the distinction between shares and debt important. In principle, all forms of debt and equity arise from contractual arrangements with a company, and the rights which attach are a question of construction. For instance, in Scottish Insurance Corp Ltd v Wilsons & Clyde Coal Co Ltd the House of Lords held that when the Coal Industry Nationalisation Act 1946 was passed, preferential shareholders were entitled to no extra, special share of assets upon winding up: construction of the terms of the shares entitled them to extra dividends, but without special words to the contrary, shareholders were presumed equal otherwise. For anyone to become a member of a company under the Companies Act 2006 section 33, the contract for shares must simply manifest the intention to do so. However, beyond this, the dividing line between shares and debt is more a matter of standard practice than law. It is legally possible to become a member of the company without being a shareholder, simply by being accepted and registered on the members' register. It is also possible to be a shareholder without being a member immediately. It is standard practice that shareholders have one vote per share, but occasionally shareholders (particularly those with preferential dividend rights) do not have votes, and debt holders and others may have votes without having shares. It is even possible for creditors to contract to be subordinated behind shareholders in insolvency – it is just unlikely, and strongly discouraged by the regulatory framework. Shares are also presumed to be transferable to other people, although like other rights, the right to trade is subject to the company's constitution.

Modern portfolio theory suggests a diversified portfolio of shares and other asset classes (such as debt in corporate bonds, treasury bonds, or money market funds) will realise more predictable returns if there is prudent market regulation.

To give people shares initially there is formally a two step process. First, under CA 2006 section 558, shares must be "allotted", or created in favour of a particular person. Second, shares are "issued" by being "transferred" to a person. In practice, because shares are not usually 'bearer shares' (i.e. the share is a physical piece of paper), the "transfer" simply means that the person's name is entered on the register of members. Under CA 2006 sections 768 and 769, a certificate that evidences the share issue should be given by the company within two months. In a typical company constitution, directors are entitled to issue shares as part of their general management rights, although they have no power to do so outside the constitution. An authorisation must state the maximum number of allottable shares and the authority can only last for five years.

The main reason to control directors' power over share allotments and issues is to prevent shareholders' rights being watered down if new shares are created. Under CA 2006 section 561, existing shareholders have a basic pre-emption right, to be offered any new shares first in proportion to their existing holding. Shareholders have 14 days to decide whether to buy. There are a series of exceptions under CA 2006 sections 564–567, for issuing bonus shares, partly paid shares, and employee shares, while private companies can opt out of pre-emption rules altogether. Furthermore, by special resolution (a three-quarter majority vote) under CA 2006 sections 570–571, shareholders may disapply pre-emption rights. In practice, large companies frequently give directors ad hoc authority to disapply pre-emption rights, but within the scope of a 'Statement of Principles' issued by asset managers. At present, the most influential guide is the document by the Institutional investors' Pre-emption Group, Disapplying Pre-emption Rights: A Statement of Principle (2008). This suggests that the general practice is to disapply the pre-emption rights on a rolling basis for routine share issues (e.g. shares subject to a clawback) at no more than 5% of share capital each year.

=== Market regulation ===
Prospectuses

- Listing Directive 2001/34/EC arts 42 – 51
- Financial Services and Markets Act 2000 ss 74-8
- R v International Stock Exchange, ex parte Else [1993] QB 534
- Prospectus Directive 2003/71/EC, amending the Listing Directive
- Transparency for Listed Companies Directive 2004/109/EC
- Financial Services and Markets Act 2000 Part VI
- Derry v Peek (1889) L R 14 App Cas 337

Insider dealing

- Criminal Justice Act 1993 ss 52-64 crime of insider trading
- Financial Services and Markets Act 2000 s 397 (criminal provision on misleading information) s 118 (civil wrong of market abuse, no false or misleading information for participants in secondary trading markets), s 119 (FSA Code of Market Conduct), s 120 (legitimate circulation of price sensitive information, e.g. compliance with listing and takeover rules)
- Directive 2003/6/EC on insider dealing and market manipulation (market abuse) and its implementing Directive 2003/124/EC on the definition and public disclosure of inside information and the definition of market abuse
- Re an Inquiry under the Company Securities (Insider Dealing) Act 1985 [1988] 1 AC 660
- Rigby and Bailey v R [2006] 1 WLR 306

=== Accounts and auditing ===
- Enron and Sarbanes–Oxley Act of 2002
- Companies Act 2006 ss 495–497, true and fair view of company in accounts.
- UK Corporate Governance Code, audit committees
- Generally Accepted Accounting Practice (UK)
- Chartered Institute of Management Accountants
- British qualified accountants
- Deloitte, Ernst & Young, KPMG and PwC
- Directive 84/253/EEC, art 24
- International Accounting Standards Board
- Auditing Practices Board
- Companies Act 2006 ss 532–536, auditor liability
- Re Kingston Cotton Mill Co (No 2) [1896] 2 Ch 279
- Candler v Crane, Christmas & Co [1951] 2 KB 164
- Formento (Stirling Area) Ltd v Selsdon Fountain Pen Co Ltd [1958] 1 WLR 45, Denning LJ
- Caparo Industries plc v Dickman [1990] 2 AC 605
- Morgan Crucible Co v Hill Samuel Bank Ltd [1991] 1 Ch. 259
- Galoo Ltd v Bright Grahame Murray [1994] 1 WLR 1360
- South Australia Asset Management Co v York Montague [1997] AC 191

=== Mergers and acquisitions ===
The market for corporate control, where parties compete to buy controlling stakes in companies, is seen by some as an important, although perhaps limited, mechanism for the board of directors' accountability. Because individual shareholders may not be as likely to act collectively as a majority shareholder, the threat of a takeover when a company share price drops, heightens the prospect that a director is removed from office by an ordinary resolution under CA 2006 section 168. Since 1959 the UK has taken the approach that directors, particularly of public companies, should do nothing with the effect of frustrating a takeover bid, unless shareholders approve it by a majority at the time of the takeover. Rule 21 of the City Code on Takeovers and Mergers consolidates this now. Typical takeover defence tactics, routinely found in US corporate law, led by Delaware, include issuing extra shares to everyone but a takeover bidder to dilute their stake unless the bidder has the board's consent to buy shareholders' shares (a "poison pill"), paying a takeover bidder to go away ("greenmail"), merely selling a key company asset to a friendly third party, or engaging in large share buyback schemes. In the US, defensive tactics must merely be employed in good faith, and be proportionate to the threat posed with regard to factors like the offer price, timing and effect on the company's stakeholders. Moreover, Delaware directors can often only be removed for a "good reason" (fought out in court) with a board classified into directors a third of whom will be removable in any given year. This makes hostile takeovers very difficult, unless a bidder promises the incumbent board large golden parachutes in return for their consent. After much debate, the EU's newly implemented Takeover Directive decided to leave member states the option under articles 9 and 12 of whether to mandate that boards remain "neutral".

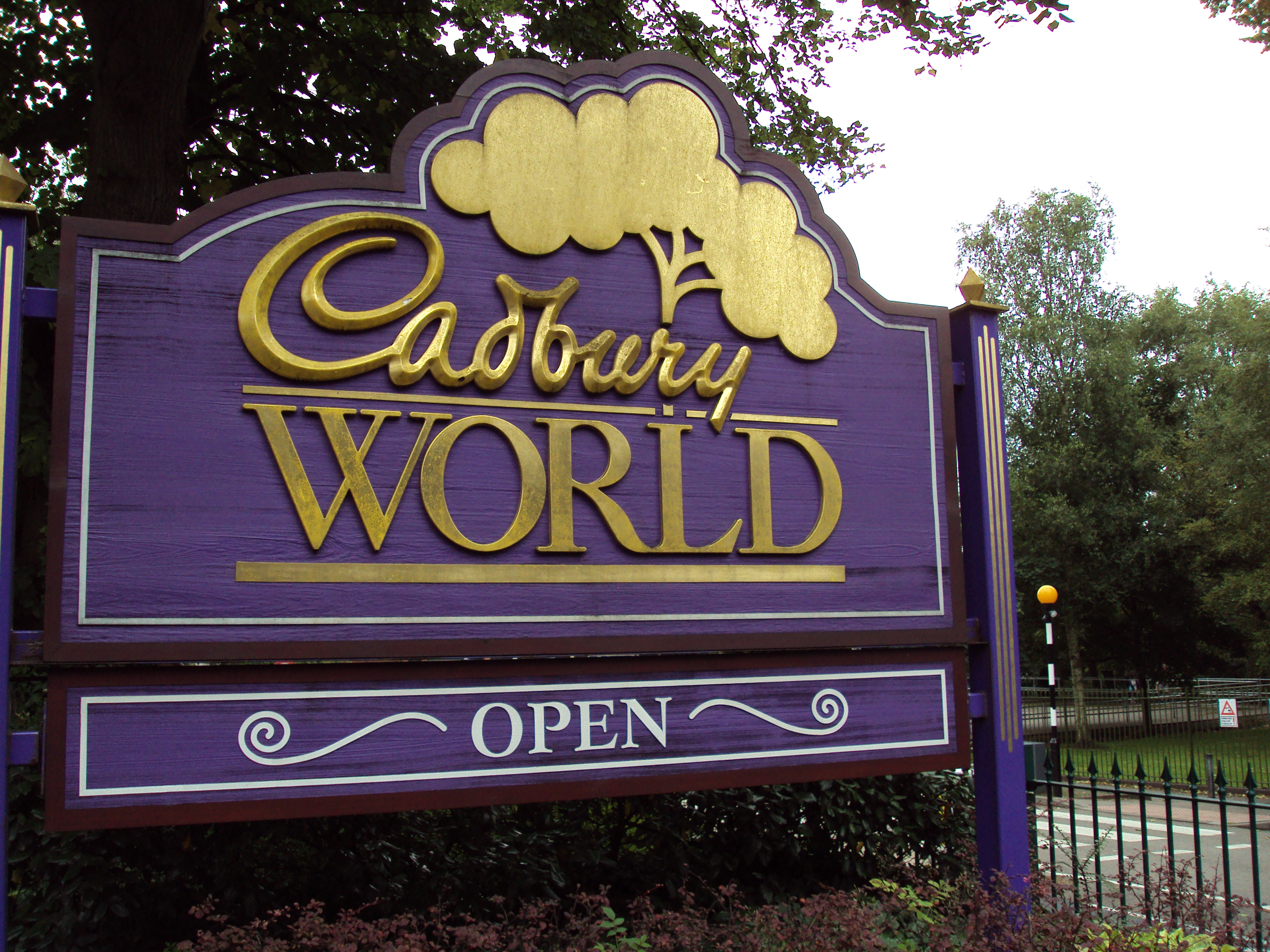
UK directors, like those at Cadbury facing the takeover from Kraft, are unable to use corporate powers to block takeover bids and enrich themselves, but this potentially leaves employees vulnerable to job cuts, or reductions in environmental or ethical standards.

Even with the UK's non-frustration principle directors always still have the option to persuade their shareholders through informed and reasoned argument that the share price offer is too low, or that the bidder may have ulterior motives that are bad for the company's employees, or for its ethical image. Under common law and the Takeover Code, directors must give out information to shareholders relevant to the bid, but not merely recommend the highest offer. The overriding common law rule, however, is to avoid any possibility of a conflict of interest, which precludes using management powers for the purpose of frustrating takeovers. In Hogg v Cramphorn Ltd the director, purportedly concerned that a takeover bidder would make many workers redundant, issued a block of company shares to a trust, thus ensuring the bidder would remain outvoted. Buckley J held the power to issue shares creates fiduciary duty to only do so for the purpose of raising capital. Directors cannot plead they acted in good faith if a court determines their interests may possibly conflict. The result is that even though directors may wish to protect employees and stakeholders from ominous bidders, the law responds in other ways. British workers have a minimal measure of job security, with very limited rights to be consulted, and no formal rights outside collective bargaining to participate in elections for the board or codetermine dismissal issues in works councils. Employees do have rights before dismissal or redundancies to reasonable notice, dismissal only for a fair reason, and a redundancy payment, under the Employment Rights Act 1996. Moreover, any changes to workers terms and conditions, or redundancies, following a restructuring through an asset (as opposed to share) sale triggers protection of the Transfer of Undertakings (Protection of Employment) Regulations 2006 meaning good economic, technical or organisational reasons must be given.

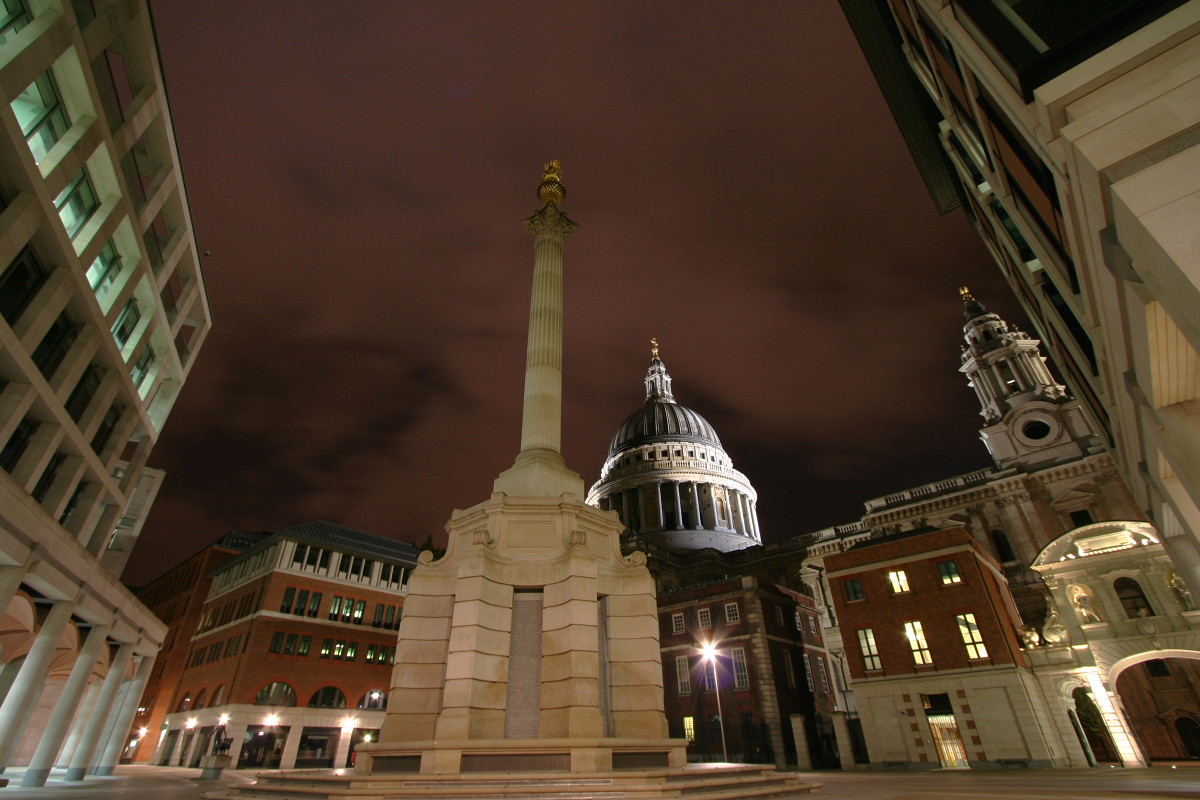
The Takeover Panel's Code, an example of principles based self-regulation, requires equal treatment and good information for shareholders, including consideration of the effects on employees.

Beyond rules restricting takeover defences, a series of rules are in place to partly protect, and partly impose obligations on minority shareholders. Under CA 2006 section 979 when a takeover bidder has already acquired 90 per cent of a company's shares it can "squeeze out" or compulsorily purchase the minority's shares at the same price per share as paid for the rest of the takeover. Only if a court determines that price is "manifestly unfair" (and market prices are presumed fair) can the shareholder object, or if the whole arrangement is merely a trick for incumbent shareholders to expropriate a minority they find undesirable, or it can be shown that shareholders had been given insufficient information to properly evaluate the offer. Conversely section 983 allows minority shareholders to require that their stakes are bought out. Further standards apply to listed companies under the Takeover Code. The Code contains six principles for takeover bids. Shareholders in the same class should be equally treated, there must be time for them to adequate information including consequences for employees, the board must act in the company's whole interests not their own, false markets and share prices should not artificially fluctuate, bids should only be announced when bidders can follow through with money, and a bid should not distract the business longer than reasonable. Following on from these principles are 38 rules, designed to flesh out in legal terms the "common sense" standards embodied in the 6 principles. The Takeover Panel administers the Code, and enforces it. Originally established in 1968 as a private club that self-regulated its members' practices, was held in R (Datafin plc) v Takeover Panel to be subject to judicial review of its actions where decisions are found to be manifestly unfair. Despite a handful of challenges, this has not happened.

== Corporate insolvency ==
- K Cork, Insolvency Law and Practice, Report of the Review Committee (1982) Cmnd 8558
- Priority on insolvency
- Insolvency procedures
- Voidable transactions
- Directors' disqualifications and unlawful trading
- Insolvency Act 1986 ss 213-215
- Company Directors Disqualification Act 1986 ss 6-7
- Colin Gwyer Associates Ltd v London Wharf (Limehouse) Ltd
- Adams v Cape Industries [1990] Ch 433
- Re Hydrodam (Corby) Ltd [1994] 2 BCLC 180

== Corporation tax ==
- Income and Corporation Taxes Act 1988
- Corporation Tax Act 2009
- Corporation Tax Act 2010

== Corporate law internationally ==
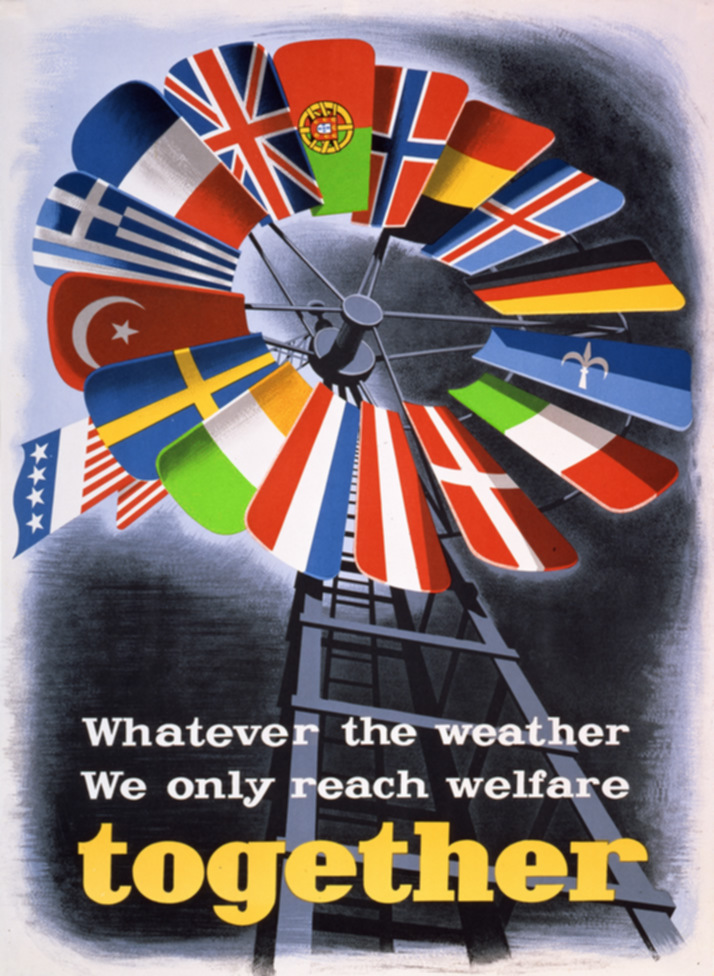
One of a number of posters created by the Economic Cooperation Administration to promote the Marshall Plan in Europe

- Regulatory competition
- European company law
- Centros Ltd v Erhvervs-og Selskabsstryrelsen [1999] 2 CMLR 551 (C-212/97)
- Kamer van Koophandel en Fabrieken voor Amsterdam v Inspire Art Ltd [2003] ECR I-10155 (C-167/01)
- US corporate law
- Liggett v Lee
- Delaware General Corporation Law
- Berkey v Third Avenue Railway
- Dodge v. Ford Motor Company, on directors' duties to the corporation and the community
- Aronson v Lewis
- Guth v. Loft Inc. 5 A.2d 503 (Del. 1939)
- In re Walt Disney Derivative Litigation
- Joy v North
- Chef v Mathes
- German company law
- World Trade Organization
- International trade
- International economic law
- International Labour Organization
- Organisation for Economic Co-operation and Development and OECD Guidelines for Multinational Enterprises
- United Nations Principles for Responsible Investment (PRI)
- Conflicts of law
- Shipping law
- International Corporate Governance Network, www.icgn.org/

== See also ==
- FTSE 100
- Corporate law
- European company law
- German company law
- US corporate law
- French company law
- UK public service law
- UK labour law
- UK banking law
- UK commercial law
- Corporate social responsibility
- Socially responsible investing
- Environmental Social and Corporate Governance
- Companies House
- Department for Business, Innovation and Skills
- Board of Trade (or DTI or DBERR)
- Insolvency Service
- Corporate tax
- UK corporation tax
- Corporation Tax Act 2010 (c 4)
