= Fabia =

Fabia may refer to:

- Fabia gens, an ancient Roman family
- Fabia, the daughter of Marcus Fabius Ambustus (consular tribune 381 BC)
- Fabia (given name), an Italian feminine given name derived from masculine Fabio
  - Fabia Arete, Roman actress
  - Fabia Eudokia, a Byzantine empress
- Natalia Fabia (born 1983), American painter
- Fabia (crab), a genus of crab in the family Pinnotheridae
- Fabia (Latium), an ancient city in Latium
- Fabia Sheen, a fictional character from the Bakugan franchise
- Škoda Fabia, an automobile
