= Fabia (given name) =

Fabia is a female given name derived from the male names Fabius, Fabian or Fabio. It may be related to the Fabia gens of the Romans, which may be derived from the Latin faba, meaning "bean". The name may refer to:

- Fabia Arete, Roman dancer, actress and singer
- Fabia Drake (1904–1990), British actress
- Fabia Eudokia (580–612), Byzantine empress
- Fabia Numantina, Roman noblewoman
- Fabia Orestilla, Roman noblewoman
- Fabia Trabaldo (born 1972), Italian athlete

== See also ==
- Fabia (disambiguation)
- Natalia Fabia (born 1983), American painter
