= List of Bakugan Battle Brawlers characters =

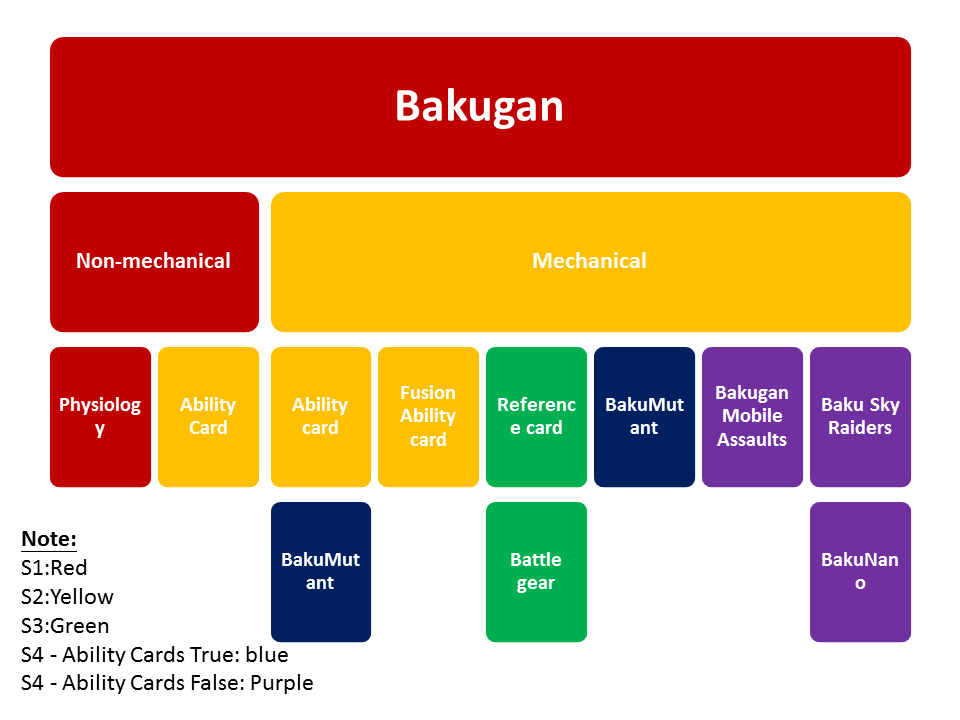
Bakugan Battle Brawlers Ability Structure.

This is a list of characters from the Japanese anime series Bakugan Battle Brawlers.

== Main characters ==
=== Battle Brawlers ===
==== Dan Kuso ====
Voiced by: Yū Kobayashi (Japanese); Scott McCord (English)

Daniel Kuso (known in the Japanese version as Danma Kuso (空操 弾馬, Kūsō Danma) and nicknamed Dan (ダン, Dan)) is the main human protagonist in the series. In the beginning, he is ranked #117, and by episode 39, he is ranked #1 and has become ranked #4 or under in episode 6 of Mechtanium Surge.

In New Vestroia, Dan returns to New Vestroia to help Drago save the world from the invading Vestals. Despite having just been introduced to the new Brawling system, Dan manages to get the hang of it before he battles his way into the Resistance by tying with Ace. He returns to Earth, following Spectra, Gus, and Lync into a portal with Mira and Baron. After losing Drago to Spectra in episode 16, his determination to get him back pays off as he and Drago reunite in episode 18. At the end of episode 19, he and Baron go back to New Vestroia through Dr. Gehabich's dimension transporter. In episode 20 he and Baron make it back to New Vestroia where they battle Mylene and Shadow in Beta City where they defeat them when Drago unleashes the power of the Perfect Core. In episode 26, he returns to Earth, along with Marucho, Shun and the rest of the Bakugan. Various portals open up across the world, allowing all the other brawlers to reunite with their Bakugan.

After the destruction of the BT System, Dan and the Brawlers learn that King Zenoheld is constructing a machine called the Alternative Weapon System, which could destroy both Earth and Vestal. Dan along with the rest of the resistance attempt to stop the alternative through any means necessary. At the end of New Vestroia, he destroys the alternative weapon system with the help of his friends and allies. In Gundalian Invaders, Dan, Marucho, Shun, Jake, and Ren join Fabia in fighting an oncoming invasion of the evil Gundalians, who want to rule over Neathia and gain control of the Sacred Orb. In Mechtanium Surge, he and Drago have a problem controlling the new powers they were given by Code eve, and can sometimes be taken over by Mag Mel and Razenoid and spawn Zenthon, a Mechtogan, which they eventually tame while in New Vestroia, after they returned to New Vestroia to control their new powers. They were number one in Bakugan Interspace until they were disqualified for using Zenthon accidentally when battling Anubias for the number one position. Dan later regained the title of Leader of the Brawlers after he apologized to the rest of the Brawlers minus Spectra.

==== Runo Misaki ====
Voiced by: Eri Sendai (Japanese); Julie Lemieux (English)

Runo Misaki (美咲 琉乃, Misaki Runo), is a 12-year-old (11 in the Japanese dub) girl who loves playing Bakugan against skilled people so she can show off. Runo is a Haos brawler. Her Partner Bakugan is a Haos Tigrerra (the others being Terrowclaw and Saurus), who is very obedient and powerful in battle. Tigrerra later evolves into Haos Blade Tigrerra. She reached 6th in the rankings. After a lengthy absence, Runo returns in the episode Enemy Allies, where she delivers the battle suits to Dan, Marucho and Shun as they battle Wiseman. From that episode on, she and Mira helped to deliver the Battle Suits to the Brawlers whenever they needed them. In Jump to Victory, she met a Baku Sky Raider named Haos Aerogan and became his new partner, but Aerogan later returned to New Vestroia. Runo is a fairly good opponent in Bakugan. Near the end of Mechtanium Surge, Runo, along with Julie and Mira, are killed when Mechtavius Destroyer annihilates Bakugan City, but their deaths are prevented when Dan, Shun, and Marucho, are able to use the Current of Time to go back to before that happened and destroy Mechtavius Destroyer.

==== Marucho Marukura ====
Voiced by: Ryō Hirohashi (Japanese); Cameron Ansell in ep. 1 and 2, Joanne Vannicola in later episodes (English)

Marucho Marukura (known in the Japanese version as Choji Marukura (丸蔵 兆治, Marukura Chōji) and nicknamed Marucho (マルチョ, Marucho)) loves to play Bakugan and is also able to change attributes. Marucho is eleven (ten in the Japanese dub) and is an aquas brawler. He is seen after being defeated by Volt in episode 13, being held as a hostage in episodes 15 and 17, and was later freed by Mira and Spectra in episode 20, even though he is unaware of this. He gets Preyas back in episode 26. Nothing is known about Preyas Angelo/Diablo. In episode 26, he goes back to Earth with Dan, Shun, Drago, the other brawlers' old Guardian Bakugan, Elfin, and Ingram, except for Storm Skyress. Marucho's trap Bakugan is Aquos Tripod Epsilon. Despite his height, he is older than Baron. Marucho is 14 years old in the second series. In episode 31, "Spectra Rises", Marucho Dan and Mira make it to Vestal where they meet up with Ace Baron and Klaus later they are challenged by both of Volt Luster for their attribute energy and then challenging Dan. Spectra then battles Dan, Mira and Marucho when both Mira and Marucho lose when Drago protects them from Cyber Helios' cyber blast. At episode 35's ending, Marucho loses the Aquos energy to Hydron and Shadow Prove, although he wins the battle. He helps fend off the onslaught of Zenoheld's robotic Bakugan during the final episode of New Vestroia. He also gains a new Bakugan and will be back in Gundalian invaders. He's now believed to be about 16 in Mechtanium Surge.

==== Shun Kazami ====
Voiced by: Chihiro Suzuki (Japanese); Zachary Bennett (English)

Shun Kazami (風見 駿, Kazami Shun) was the former 1st ranked Bakugan brawler but after Masquerade showed up, he moves down to 6th, then back up to 5th after defeating Komba, then 2nd and ultimately to 3rd by the end of the first series. Shun is a loner, a boy of very few words, yet is willing to help his friends at almost every turn. He is a Ventus brawler and he approaches Bakugan like a ninja. He lives with his grandfather, who used to be a famous ninja warrior, who once expected Shun to follow in his footsteps instead of playing Bakugan. His Partner Bakugan is a Ventus Skyress, whom Shun received from his sick mother before she fell into a coma, and died in the Japanese series. It is unknown if Shun has a father, this is not yet revealed, and he has not appeared in any of the seasons. Skyress later evolved into Storm Skyress.

In New Vestroia, Shun came to New Vestroia completely by accident, and explained why Dan could not contact him in episode 1; he was up alone in the mountains working on his ninja skills when a warp hole appeared and he was sucked into New Vestroia. He is 15 years old in New Vestroia. He made a cameo appearance in episode 4 when Marucho battled Mylene, but his face was not revealed as his hood covered it completely and was offered a place in the Vexos. After hearing that Skyress was taken captive, he rushed towards one of the cities to save her, but on the way, teamed up with Dan after rescuing him from Spectra and Gus. After being separated from Skyress, he teams up with Ventus Ingram, who he grabbed just before a beam pulled him into the ship. In the beginning, he does not get along with Ace very well, who refers to him as a "ninja-wannabe", but he is deeply admired by Baron who, in episode 7, even tries to imitate some of Shun's ninja moves but fails. He is taken hostage in episode 15, after being defeated by Shadow. Mira and Spectra later free him in episode 20, though he is unaware of this. He is reunited with Storm Skyress in episode 26 but she stays in New Vestroia, claiming that she was in his past and that Ingram is officially his new partner now. In episode 26, he goes back to Earth with Marucho, Dan, Drago, and the other brawler's Bakugan, except for Storm Skyress. Shun returns to New Vestroia a few episodes after the beginning of the second series and has a run-in with Lync Volan of the Vexos. Storm Skyress comes to his rescue, and after Lync is defeated by Shun and Ingram, Skyress bids Shun her final farewell. Shun is still the strong silent type and highly skilled with Bakugan and is willing to help his friends whenever they need it. He helps Dan defeat the Alternative in the final episode of New Vestroia. Not much has changed in how he acts or looks, except for the fact that he has cut off his ponytail to neck length. His Trap Bakugan is Ventus Hylash and his current Guardian Bakugan is Ventus Master Ingram.

Shun is 16 years old in Gundalian Invaders. Shun returns in Gundalian Invaders as the second-ranked battler in Bakugan Interspace and partnered with the synthetic Hawktor clone. At first, he does not trust Ren and asks Fabia for her side of the story after the comes to Earth. Together they expose Ren for the liar he is and the brawlers side with Fabia at which point he is given the real Ventus Hawktor that Fabia gave him. When the brawlers head to Neathia, Shun helps restart the second defense shield by switching Bakugan with Dan and heading to the generator. The mission is a success, but it is later destroyed by Barodius and Colossus Dharak.

Shun returns again in "Mechtanium Surge" as co-captain of the Battle Brawlers. His Bakugan is Ventus Taylean which is another Bakugan from Neathia. In episode 7, Dan disappears and Shun loses his cool as the new captain of the Battle Brawlers.

==== Julie Makimoto ====
Voiced by: Risa Mizuno (Japanese); Katie Griffin (English)

Julie Makimoto (known in the Japanese version as Julie Heyward (ジュリィ・ヘイワード, Jurī Heiwādo) is a 12-year-old Blasian girl from Las Vegas, United States, who tries to stay happy even when the worst has happened (for example, when Billy ended up under the control of Masquerade); she acts happy after something bad happened but she generally does that just to cover up her true feelings inside. Julie forgets things easily, proving that she is a little scatterbrained at times. In the Japanese version, Julie spices her speech with American phrases, differentiating her personality from the others. She adores Dan, and by "adore", we mean "make out adore". This is why she's jealous of Runo, but eventually gets over Dan and becomes best friends with Runo. She is a Subterra battler and her guardian Bakugan is her Subterra Gorem. Gorem then evolves into Subterra Hammer Gorem. Julie has a sister named Daisy who has bested her in everything since she was a child. She reached 8th in the rankings. She chose not to brawl against Zenoheld in the final showdown as Gorem did not want to put her into trouble. She returns in Gundalian Invaders as a neighbor of Dan's once he moves. She works at a cafe and in Revelation, it is revealed she is a cheerleader for the team Jake plays for. This strongly suggests she is already in high school in her first year with Dan. She's believed to be about 16 years old. In Brawler To Be, Jake is having his first battle and Jake gets scared, so Julie teaches Jake some lessons. Her role is basically that of a supporting character. Julie returns in Mechtanium Surge as a news reporter. Near the end of that season, Julie is killed alongside Runo and Mira when Mechtavius Destroyer levels Bakugan City, but her death is prevented when Dan, Shun, and Marucho use the Current of Time to go back and destroy Mechtavius Destroyer.

==== Alice Gehabich ====
Voiced by: Mamiko Noto (Japanese); Emilie-Claire Barlow (English)

Alice Gehabich (アリス・ゲーハビッチ, Arisu Gēhabicchi) is a 14-year-old girl from Moscow. Although she knows almost everything about the game, she rarely plays it; she is generally afraid of hurting others, including Bakugan. She usually just gives advice to the other brawlers, which she prefers over battling. Alice is kind and caring, worried for and compassionate towards others and does not think of herself. She also adores Shun. Due to her exposure to the Silent Core, Alice develops a masculine second personality called Masquerade. Michael Gehabich is her grandfather; who she constantly worries about after finding out that his alter-ego is the monstrous Hal-G and that he works for Naga. Alice leaves the Brawlers after finding out that she was Masquerade out of intense guilt over what she had done as him, as well as fearing the Battle Brawlers will have a deep grudge against her, but later returns in time to save Dan in the form of Masquerade. Her guardian is Alpha Hydranoid, which she received from Masquerade after he bid her farewell and left her body. After that, she initially begins to battle more, with her Darkus attribute, which she inherited from Masquerade. She either has a crush on Shun or Lync. Alice is 17 years old in New Vestroia, 18 years old in Gundalian Invaders, and 19 years old in Mechtanium Surge. Alice has a special ability that most brawlers wish to have, she can see the power level of any Bakugan on the field even if the Bakugan is not playing. That is why she does not have a Baku-pod. She ultimately ends up in 2nd place at the end of the series.

==== Joe Brown ====
Voiced by: Sōichirō Hoshi (Japanese); Travis Ferris (12), Scott McCord (16) (English)

Joe Brown (known in the Japanese version as Osamu Joh (城 治, Jō Osamu)), also known as Webmaster Joe (ウェブマスター・ジョウ, Uebumasutā Jō). In the first season, it was revealed that due to an unknown health condition, he lived in a hospital for some time. During this time, the Brawlers thought that he was working for Masquerade, because somehow, Masquerade knew every location they set foot, although this was because Alice was a Battle Brawler, so she knew where they were. After Dan confronted him, he told Dan that he would only tell him the truth if Dan could beat him in a battle. In the middle of the battle, Joe fainted, and when he awoke he revealed that the brawlers' theory was untrue and he actually sent a message to all of the Bakugan players around the world to warn them that Masquerade was plotting against them. After the truth was revealed, they asked him if he wanted to become a Battle Brawler, which he gladly accepted. He then revealed that he and his mother were going on a road trip for the time being, to see the world outside of the hospital. Sometime later, after he moved to the Brawlers' neighborhood, he found Wavern, who had the Infinity Core hidden inside of her. It was also revealed that Wavern was Naga's twin sister and that he was looking for her in order to absorb the infinity core. After he obtained Wavern, Joe was the first person to beat Masquerade in a one-on-one battle.

==== Jake Vallory ====
Voiced by: Shintarō Ōhata (Japanese); Dan Petronijevic (English)

Jake Vallory (ジェイク・ヴァレリ, Jeiku Vareri) is a new friend of Dan's after his arrival in his new town. He has a powerful presence because he's big for his age. He's very calm but can get overly excited and obsessive. He is a Subterra brawler and his Bakugan partner is Coredem. He is just starting out as a brawler and still was asked to join the Bakugan Battle Brawlers. He really admires Dan and likes to use his name and rhymes it with other words like, " Dan the Man with the big, brown van." which sometimes irritates Dan. Later on, when the brawlers are on Neathia Jake gets kidnapped and brainwashed but as of episode 34, it looks like Jake is coming back to his senses. But in Dream Escape, he has a dream where Dan is shouting his name and it is then that he comes back to his senses and goes back to Neathia with the others.

==== Gunz Lazar ====
Voiced by: Kenichi Suzumura (Japanese); Graeme Cornies (English)

Gunz Lazar (ガンズ ・ ラザール Ganzu Razāru) is a new character and the new member of the Battle Brawlers in Arc 2 of Mechtanium Surge. Gunz has blond hair, and wears a gray, with red lining, jumpsuit. His eyes are violet. He thinks of himself as Dan's greatest opponent and has a somewhat cocky personality. He is a Haos brawler and his partner is Reptak. He was seen in Evil Arrival which he fought in the Neo Tournament in Bakugan City. However, he was lost since Wiseman Cometh. In Battle Suit Bash, he was revealed that he was captured by Wiseman and that he was absorbing Gunz's energy as well as stealing his appearance using vines. He later freed himself in Enemy Infiltration. He later took on the Wiseman persona himself after Coredegon stopped using it, becoming a second Wiseman and vowing vengeance against Dan for turning Reptak against him. He was defeated and later abandoned the persona in Doom Dimension Throwdown, joining the Brawlers and reuniting with Reptak.

=== Bakugan Brawlers' Resistance ===
The Bakugan Brawlers' Resistance' is a resistance movement that opposed the Vexos. Among its members are:

==== Mira Fermin ====
Voiced by: Risa Yukino (Japanese); Alyson Court (English)

Mira Fermin (ミラ・フェルミン, Mira Ferumin) is a 16-year-old Vestal girl who had formed the Bakugan Brawler Resistance and became a leader of it after witnessing the tortured Alpha Hydranoid speak out in vengeance to the invaders, to free all the captured Bakugan from Prince Hydron and the Vexos. At the end of Surprise Visitor, she along with Baron travel with Dan back to his world. In Unmasked, Mira challenges Spectra to a battle and if she's victorious, Spectra will be unmasked. If she loses, however, she has to join the Vexos and even battle against her own friends. She told herself in the beginning that her hero was always her brother, Keith, but forced herself to change her mind about it after Spectra unmasks himself in front of her, revealing that he was her 'hero'. Baron described her as 'intense'. She betrays the Brawlers in Family Ties as she says that she wants to stay with Keith, once telling the others on Earth that Spectra is her brother. She returns to New Vestroia through the portal Apollonir opened with Spectra, Gus and Lync after revealing her betrayal. In Beta City Blues, she reveals that she has joined the Vexos, but is really wondering what Spectra is up to. In Brotherly Love she challenged her elder brother to a battle and if she wins, she goes back to being with her real brother and not Spectra. However, if she loses, she will have no choice but to work for and obey Spectra. She later lost the brawl. She is regretful of this as she says, "I'm sorry, my friends" after the battle, and is also seen crying as she has no choice but to be an enemy to the Resistance that she had founded. She later returns to the Resistance which was her main plan. She returns to Vestal with Ace and Baron and their Bakugan, in case the Vexos will want to take back New Vestroia for themselves in the future. Mira visits the Brawlers on Earth for a visit but soon returns to Vestal, this time with Dan and Marucho, and they meet up with Ace and Baron at Klaus Von Hertzen's estate. Following the defeat of Zenoheld, she returns to Vestal with her older brother, Gus, and the rest of the Vestal Resistance. She also has a brother that she desperately wants to find after he disappeared during Hydranoid's rebellion. Although she is the leader, she has a small tendency to go off on her own. She prefers the Subterra attribute. Her main Bakugan is Subterra Wilda and her Trap Bakugan is Baliton. She is good friends with Julie and Runo. It was also the main reason for Ace's hostility to Dan because Ace has a romantic crush on Mira. Mira is a strong fierce leader and very caring about everyone. she also always wishes that her brother Keith would return and her wish came true. Mira returns in Bakugan: Mechtanium Surge where she helps the brawlers by creating powered battle suits for their Bakugan. She is among those killed by Mechtavius Destroyer near the end of the season when he destroys Bakugan City, but her death is prevented when Dan, Shun, and Marucho are able to go back in time and destroy Mechtavius Destroyer.

==== Ace Grit ====
Voiced by: Yasuaki Takumi (Japanese); Alex House in ep. 1-47, David Reale in 48-52 (English)

Ace Grit (エース・グリッド, Ēzu Guriddo) is a Vestal boy, 16 years of age, and the Darkus battler of the Resistance with Darkus Percival as his guardian and Darkus Falcon Fly as his trap. He is often very rash and does not think things through. As revealed in episode 13, Ace was once a top brawler in the Vestal tournaments but stayed away after Hydron used them to find strong brawlers. Mira approached him, invited him to the Resistance, and gave him Percival. Ace first shows his skills as a brawler when he battles Dan in the second episode of the series: Ace refuses to accept humans on the Resistance and challenges Dan to a battle to prove his skills. After three hours, the battle ends in a draw and the two become fast best friends.

==== Baron Leltoy ====
Voiced by: Ryūichi Kubota (Japanese); Cameron Kennedy (English)

Baron Leltoy (known in the Japanese version as Baron Rich (バロン・リッチ, Baron Ricchi)). Originally, Baron fought with Tigrerra but lost her to Spectra Phantom and Pyrus Helios. He used Haos Nemus as his main Bakugan and uses Piercian as his Trap Bakugan. In Surprise Visitor, he says that he had always wondered what it would be like on the other side of the portal, which was the portal that led Runo to New Vestroia from Earth. In the end, he decides to follow Dan, Mira, and Runo to Earth in order to stop the Vexos from destroying it. Baron admires Runo as one of the six original Battle Brawlers but Runo's father does not like the fact that he does. He returns to New Vestroia with Dan through Dr. Gehabich's dimension transporter. He seems to be very fond of the activities done on Earth, especially by Dan e.g. taking baths. In Beta City Blues, he and Dan made it back to New Vestroia where they battled Mylene and Shadow in Beta City. Baron was defeated in helping Dan and Drago, but he still was able to keep Nemus. He returns to Vestal with Ace and Mira with their Bakugan, in case the Vexos will want to take back New Vestroia for themselves in the future.

==== Spectra Phantom (Keith Fermin) ====
Voiced by: Yasuhiro Mamiya (Japanese); Dan Petronijevic (English)

Spectra Phantom (スペクトラ・ファントム, Supekutora Fantomu). At the beginning of the series, Spectra Phantom would only serve under and obey Prince Hydron. Little was known about Spectra, but it confirmed he is very powerful and thinks highly of his skills as a Pyrus brawler. He was the Vexos' strongest battler and used Pyrus Viper Helios as his main Bakugan and Metalfencer as his Trap Bakugan. After seeing Drago's powers, Spectra said that he's not going to let it be a 'play thing', which means that even when he captures Drago, he will not give him to Prince Hydron. In What's the Plan?, Mira noticed a possibility that Spectra could be Mira's brother. How he became Spectra is unknown. He also wished to join forces with Dan and the Resistance so they could take Prince Hydron down together in an attempt to rule New Vestroia and Vestal. After Gus lost to Mira, Spectra unmasks himself, proving himself as Mira's older brother Keith Fermin (キース・フェルミン, Kīsu Ferumin). When he, Gus and Lync traveled to Earth, Mylene took over as leader. Meanwhile, Spectra won the Bakugan brawl against Dan and Drago and takes Drago. Dan defeats him and a corrupted Drago during their brawl with the help of Pyrus Apollonir. In episode 19, he convinced Mira to join him. He needed her help on his "ultimate plan", which was creating a Cyber Helios and duplicating the power of the Perfect Core, planning to use this Bakugan to overthrow the Vestal royal family. In Brotherly Love he battled Mira and won with his new Cyborg Helios. In episode 24 he took several Mechanical Bakugan for his own purpose of making Maxus Helios to defeat Dan. He does not return to Vestal, but he remains on the other rim of the planets area in a ship with Gus, Helios, Elico, Vulcan, and Brontes.

Spectra appears again in Spectra Rises, battles Dan, and loses, but nevertheless says he will see him again soon. As shown in Spectra Rises, he used the forbidden card "Chaos Ability X" on Elico, Vulcan and Brontes, which forced their unnatural evolution, making them his battle weapons. In All Or Nothing, Spectra transports Dan to his ship upon reaching Earth to retrieve the Perfect Core from Drago. During their battle, Spectra seems to have a change of heart, referring to Dan as his friend in thanks for enlightening him. He reveals shortly that using data on Bakugan evolution, he plans to bring out even further power from within the Bakugan. After they arrive at the Mother Palace, he states that the Resistance is on their own in shutting down the BT system. After confronting Zenoheld however, Gus is defeated and Spectra soon forms a temporary alliance with Dan to avenge his fallen comrade. After the Pyrus attribute energy is absorbed and the BT system begins to activate, his ship is used to transport all of the Bakugan on New Vestroia to Earth. When time begins to run out, and the Resistance decides to bail out while they still can, Helios leaves Spectra and confronts Drago about staying to evacuate the remaining Bakugan. The two decide to head off and destroy the BT system, and after Drago evolves by absorbing the attribute energies, Helios and Spectra once again become Dan and Drago's rivals before leaving New Vestroia. But at the end of Spectra's Last Stand, Spectra agrees to join Dan and the Resistance and takes off his mask, becoming Keith once again.

Spectra has returned in the fourth season, Bakugan Mechtanium Surge. He was first seen in the shadows receiving a distress call from Marucho who was fighting against the rampaging chaos Bakugan, although Marucho and Shun were surprised that Spectra came to help they were still glad. Spectra left afterwards but not before telling Dan that he has changed from the old Dan. Spectra and Helios returned to help the brawlers again when they were fighting against Mag Mel on Gundalia and before they left Spectra said they had nothing left to worry about over the brawlers. When Dan thanked the two of them for helping, Spectra said they could call on him anytime.

=== Castle Knights ===
==== Fabia Sheen ====
Voiced by: Haruhi Terada (Japanese); Stephanie Anne Mills (English)

Fabia Sheen (ファビア・シーン, Fabia Shīn) is the Princess of Neathia. She is the younger sister of Serena Sheen, the former Neathian Queen. Fabia's reason for brawling is to save her planet from the Gundalians. She is also the fiancée of the former Captain of the Castle Knights, Jin, who is deceased.

She seems to have the same kind of love for freedom and initiative to act as Mira does. She also seems to be strong, because she shoulder threw Dan twice in episode 3, the first was by accident and the second was when she got mad at Dan after losing, and in episode 10 when Zenet tried to take her as a hostage and Fabia threw her hard on the ground. Those incidents may prove Ren Krawler's statement about the Neathians' specialty at close combat, although most of what Ren said was a lie to put down the Neathians. Fabia owns Aranaut, the bakugan of her deceased fiancée, Jin. After she becomes the new Neathian Queen in Bakugan: Mechtanium Surge, following her sister stepping down from the throne, she gives Aranaut to Captain Elright.

==== Rafe ====
Voiced by: Kenji Akabane (Japanese); Andrew Craig (English)

Rafe (known in the Japanese version as Ralph Waver (ラルフ・ウェイバー, Rarufu Weibā)) is a new character in Bakugan: Mechantium Surge. He is a Neathian Castle Knight who was sent by Princess Fabia to go to Earth to help the Brawlers with the Mechtogan threat. He is the new Haos Brawler of the Battle Brawlers. Since the Battle Brawlers helped save Neathia during the war against Emperor Barodius Rafe, along with other members of the Castle Knights, have looked up to Dan and the Brawlers. Rafe was disappointed when he and Paige discovered how much the Brawlers had changed with Dan and Drago gone but he never gave up believing in the Battle Brawlers. After Mag Mel's defeat Rafe and Wolfurio returned to Neathia.

=== Gundalian Forces ===
==== Ren Krawler ====
Voiced by: Hirofumi Nojima (Japanese); David Reale (1-9), Peter Cugno (English)

Ren Krawler (レン・クロウラー, Ren Kurōrā) is a 16-year-old Darkus Brawler. Ren was the leader of a secret agent group sent to Earth by Emperor Barodius to find the DNA Code. He is an alien disguised as a human sent to find the best brawlers and defeat the Neathians. Ren comes from the underground world of Gundalia where he was kept, unknowingly, by the Emperor's family due to his possession of a dark Bakugan with a powerful ability. He is a member of the Twelve Orders because he thinks that would save his people if he works for them. He is attempting to trick the brawlers into thinking that the Neathians are the ones trying to conquer Gundalia. His Bakugan partner is Linehalt.

After Sid, Lena, Jesse and Zenet were punished by the Twelve Orders, Ren feels incredibly guilty over what has happened, especially since he has gotten off Scot free each time. While he was fighting with Dan, he was surprised to see that Sid is alive and is relieved to hear from him that the others are alive as well. Sid saves Ren from Dharak's attack and falls to his death, not before giving Ren his Rubanoid. After some serious thought and battling with Dan, Ren decides to turn on Barodius and do something he should have done a long time ago: fight alongside his true friends. At first, the Neathians do not accept him, but after battling Fabia, where he lost, Fabia offers him her hand and he goes with the Brawlers. He is now one of the Castle Knights. After the war is over Ren returns to Gundalia along with his teammates and Nurzak.

In Mechtanium Surge, Ren has become the commander of the Gundalian Forces and is reunited with the Brawlers when they come to help Gundalia fight against Mag Mel.

==== Paige ====
Voiced by: Mitsuki Saiga (Japanese); Annick Obonsawin (English)

Paige (known in the Japanese version as Pamela Schwartz (パメラ・シュワルツ, Pamera Shuwarutsu)) is a new character in Bakugan: Mechtanium Surge. She is a Gundalian Soldier who was sent to Earth by Princess Fabia of Neathia to help the brawlers deal with the Mechtagan threat. She is the new Subterra Brawler of the Battle Brawlers. Paige and Boulderon like to charge head first into battle. When Paige first met the Brawlers she was unimpressed with the way they acted and couldn't understand why Rafe looked up to them. Later though Paige changes her mind and figures out why Rafe looks up to them when Marucho comes up with a plan to win a competition. Paige later admits she may have been a bit too hot-headed with her first judgement of Shun and Marucho. After Mag Mel's defeat Paige and Boulderon returned to Gundalia.

== Villains ==
=== Doom Dimension's faction ===
==== Hal-G ====
Voiced by: Masaharu Satō (Japanese); Ron Pardo (English); Osman Albayrak (Turkish)

Hal-G is a man with green skin and white hair who was the alter-ego of Alice's grandfather Michael after he was exposed to the Silent Core just like Alice, who became Masquerade. He assisted Naga in his quest to get the Infinity Core from Wayvern. After Naga was destroyed, Hal-G was exposed to the Infinity Core and returned to his human form.

==== Masquerade ====
Voiced by: Sōichirō Hoshi (Japanese); Lyon Smith (English); Gökhan Akçakara (Turkish)

Masquerade (マスカレイド, Masukareido) is Alice's alternate personality and used to be the first-ranked Bakugan player in the world before he left Alice's body. His goal is to send all Bakugan to the Doom Dimension with his Doom Card, so he can evolve his Hydranoid and have the ultimate Bakugan (to take the Infinity Core and bring it to Naga). He is a Darkus battler. He is revealed to be Alice in episode 38 and his origin is revealed in episode 39. Masquerade came to life when negative energy changed Alice when she was exposed to the energy of the Silent Core alongside her grandfather Michael. Darkus Hydranoid is Masquerade's Guardian Bakugan (his first Guardian Bakugan was Reaper, but he sent it to the Doom Dimension). He battles with Dan in episode 38 and loses. After that, Masquerade takes his mask off, revealing his true identity, Alice. Following the battle against Centorrior and Druman, Masquerade disappears from Alice's body. In New Vestroia, Masquerade made a minor appearance in episode 32 during Alice and Chan Lee's Brawl against Shadow.

=== Vexos ===
==== King Zenoheld ====
Voiced by: Kōji Ishii (Japanese); John Stocker (English)

The central villain of the second season. The King of Vestal and a leader of the Vexos. He is the one responsible into invade New Vestroia, capturing the Bakugan and them to fight each other to create Mechanical Bakugan as his own weapons.

In the second half of New Vestroia, Zenoheld flees Vestal and resides in his palace on the outer skirts of the galaxy that is remote from civilization. He is revealed to be a brawler and he sends a message to the Six Ancient Warriors to surrender their Attribute Energies to him so that Professor Clay can power up the Bakugan Termination System. They decline his offer at first, but then they decide to battle him. When they arrive, Zenoheld reveals that he owns a Mechanical Bakugan, Pyrus Farbros. After a tough battle, Zenoheld comes out victorious, but the Ancients escaped and entrusted their Attribute Energies to the Resistance.

In Ultimate Weapon, he battled Spectra, who rammed into his palace. During the entire battle, he was losing, even with Assail Farbros, because later Gus joined Spectra. However, when Farbros combined with the Alternative, he overpowered both of them.

In All For One and Final Fury, he uses the Alternative against the brawlers, but when the Alternative was destroyed, Farbros was destroyed by Dryoid. Hydron then used Dryoid to trap Zenoheld until the Alternative explodes, supposedly killing all three.

==== Professor Clay Fermin ====
Voiced by: Kenichirou Matsuda (Japanese); Scott McCord (English)

Professor Clay Fermin is Mira and Keith's father who created the first Mechanical Bakugan named Ventus Altair for Lync in Cyber Nightmare. He also appeared in Facing Ace with Alpha Hydranoid. He also created Darkus Hades and Trap Darkus Fortress for Shadow. Professor Clay is also credited for making the Cyber Bakugan that were intended for Prince Hydron but are being reprogramed for Spectra by Lync. He also turns Pyrus Helios into Pyrus Cyborg Helios after Helios gave him the idea of a Cyborg Bakugan. He also oversaw the test run of his creation Farbros in King Zenoheld's battle with the six Ancient Warriors. Besides Altair, Cyborg Helios, and Farbros, other examples of Professor Clay's Mechanical Bakugan creations are Aquos Brachium, Darkus Fortress, Subterra Dryoid, Dynamo, Fencer, Foxbat, Grafias, Grakus Hound, Hades, Klawgor, Leefram, Macubass, Metalfencer, Scraper, Spindle, Spitarm, Spyderfencer, and Wired. He also designed the Bakugan Termination System and is currently developing the Alternative Weapon system for King Zenoheld. As of Ultimate Weapon, he has finished the Alternative Weapon system (which he based on Farbros). In Final Fury, he was killed along with Hydron & Zenoheld when the Alternative System was destroyed, while he was watching the video sent by Fabia about the Bakugan at war.

==== Prince Hydron ====
Voiced by: Sōichirō Hoshi (Japanese); Lyon Smith (English)

Hydron was the commander of the Vexos, the Vestal Prince and Zenoheld's son. He tried collecting all six of the fighting Bakugan that saved Vestroia and keep them as trophies. The Vexos continually failed to bring him Drago, the last of the six fighting Bakugan needed in his collection, as he had already in possession of Gorem, Preyas, Tigrerra, Skyress, and Hydranoid in a petrified statue form. He is shown to have a habit of twirling his hair between his fingers. In episode 17, he may have been aware that Spectra had Drago in his hands. At the end of the first half of the series, he flees New Vestroia with Mylene, Volt, Lync, Shadow and Professor Clay. He attempted to kill Spectra due to Spectra's betrayal but failed due to Spectra's own determination for power. He lost the six fighting Bakugan to the Resistance in Reunion. In Revenge of the Vexos, he started brawling with Subterra Bakugan, using Dryoid when he is sent to obtain the Haos Energy from Baron's Mega Nemus and succeeded. In Elfin On the Run, he teams up with Shadow Prove to try to obtain the Aquos Energy from Marucho and Aquos Minx Elfin and succeeds in defeating Elfin, but lost to Preyas. Later, he battles Dan and Spectra at the Mother Palace but loses to Helios and his new Battle Gear. In Volt's Revolt, after Volt leaves the Vexos, Zenoheld orders Hydron to deal with Volt. Volt defeats Hydron in a brawl, but Hydron starts to go insane and throws a dimensional grenade at Volt to send him to another dimension. He is almost pulled in with Volt but escapes in the nick of time. In Payback, when Lync copies the plans for the Vexos' new Alternative Weapon system, Hydron follows Lync and defeats him in a brawl. He then throws another dimensional grenade at Lync to send him to the same dimension as Volt. When he returns, he is looking for his father's approval, but Zenoheld ignores Hydron blaming him for his minions' failures. This causes Hydron to face his father. When he does, he loses and is put in a cell across from a shadowed figure, which is possibly Gus from the figure's blue hair. In the next episode, it did turn out to be Gus, and they had a brief conversation before the opening. Gus later tricks Hydron, after a string of dog-related insults on Gus's part, into brawling with him. This breaks the doors on the cells releasing both. Before flying off, Gus says that he could have asked Hydron nicely but that would probably not work only further angering Hydron. He is later seen making his own, escape attempt on Dryoid. He makes it to the ship with the other Bakugan Brawlers. They forgive him and he is presumed that he was killed after ensuring that his father will not escape the blast from the ALternative's destruction.

==== Mylene Farrow ====
Voiced by: Fūko Saitō (Japanese); Bailey Stocker (English)

Mylene is the only female in the Vexos. She did not trust Spectra and enjoys doing things her way, but is still a loyal member of the Vexos. She becomes the leader of the Vexos after Spectra and Gus travel to Earth. However, King Zenoheld later became the ruler of the Vexos. Mylene used Aquos Elico as her main Bakugan and Aquos Tripod Theta as her Trap Bakugan. She defeated Ace in episode 13. She enjoyed the power of being the leader of the Vexos and, like Spectra, is tired of Prince Hydron bossing her around all the time. She also gets annoyed easily by Shadow Prove, who will not stop following her everywhere she goes. In episode 20 she and Shadow Prove battled Dan and Baron in Beta City and were defeated when Drago unleashed the power of the Perfect Core. She escapes New Vestroia with Volt, Shadow, and Lync, saying that it could be destroyed by the battle between Spectra and Dan and their Bakugan, discarding her guardian Bakugan together with Volt's Haos Brontes, as she thinks that Bakugan with feelings are useless. She later flees to Vestal with the Vexos, Prince Hydron, and Professor Clay, leaving Spectra and Gus. She later duels Ace in order to obtain Percival's Darkus Energy-wielding Aquos Macubass, but was defeated by Ace and Klaus. She then went to Earth with Lync to draw out the brawlers. They found Runo and Mira and battle them. Mylene defeats both Runo and Mira, thus gaining the Subterra energy. She later goes on to defeat Shun and Baron alongside Volt, taking the Ventus energy. After Zenoheld's announcement to create the Alternate Weapons System that would destroy both Vestal and Earth, she appears when Volt was about to leave, warning him about his idea. When he leaves, she wishes him luck and appears saddened when she hears what happened. In episode 48, Mylene is ordered by Zenoheld to retrieve the Brawlers Battle Gear data and DNA code for the Alternative Weapons system. She is then lured into Bakugan Interspace with Shadow Prove by Keith and Mira and is forced to battle. She no longer serves Zenoheld and has named herself a free agent. She loses to Mira and her mechanical Bakugan is destroyed. In the end, she rejects the Brawlers' offer to join them and instead throws a dimensional grenade at Keith and Mira. But after the grenade activated, Bakugan Interspace shut down, trapping her, Shadow Prove, Keith, and Mira inside. Marucho made a connection to bring them back, so Mira told Mylene and Shadow to come, but Mylene refuses to go. Mylene then got pulled by the dimensional pull until Mira and Keith grabbed her hand, but accidentally let go of her as Mira and Keith were teleported and Shadow grabbed Mylene's hand as they both were pulled into the dimensional portal. Her fate is unknown.

==== Shadow Prove ====
Voiced by: Daisuke Endō (Japanese); Darren Frost (English)

Shadow is a Darkus brawler. He is very childish and jester-like. When he starts a battle, he is very pompous. His Guardian Bakugan is Darkus Hades, who was created with Alpha Hydranoid's DNA, and he also has Darkus Fortress as a Trap Bakugan. Mylene described him as a child in episode 3, and then a hyena in episode 15. He has the ability to copy other people's voices as he tricked Ace and Marucho into falling for a trap by being the voice of Mira and Dan respectively. He has a habit of sticking his tongue out every time he talks or laughs. He defeated Shun in episode 15. In episode 20 he and Mylene battled Dan and Baron in Beta City and were defeated when Drago unleashed the power of the Perfect Core. He later flees to Vestal with the Vexos, Prince Hydron, and Professor Clay, leaving Spectra and Gus. But soon after, he is forced to leave Vestal with the other Vexos after the citizens of Vestal rally against Zenoheld and Hydron. Later when Spectra blocks the Vexos from teleporting to Vestal, Zenoheld sends Shadow to Earth to battle Alice to lure the Brawlers back to Earth. Shadow does stalk her disguised as a werewolf before she battles him. He loses his Darkus Hades against Alice and Chan Lee but reveals his mechanical Bakugan Darkus MAC Spyder, and wins easily. In episode 35, he joins with Prince Hydron to battle Marucho for the Aquos attribute energy and succeeds upon defeating Elfin, but lost to Preyas. When the Resistance infiltrated the Mother Palace, Shadow and Lync fought Ace and Marucho, winning the battle and taking the Darkus energy. He is trapped in Bakugan Interspace along with Mylene, Keith and Mira. Shadow and Mylene are pulled into the dimensional portal while Mira and Keith were teleported back to Earth. Because of staying behind with Mylene, it could be guessed Shadow has an attraction towards her. His fate is unknown.

==== Volt Luster ====
Voiced by: Tomoaki Maeno (Japanese); Carter Hayden (English)

Volt is a Haos attribute brawler. He used Haos Brontes as his Guardian Bakugan and Haos Dynamo as a Trap Bakugan. He and Lync Volan are the Vexos' tag team champions, although they do not get along well together. He gets defeated by Dan in Invasion of the Vestals, and then again in episode 9 by Ace and Shun in the Bakugan Battle Tournament. He defeats Marucho in episode 14. He is defeated by Baron in Wall To Wall Brawl, and in Ultimate Bakugan is shown with Mylene and Shadow as they hatched an escape plan. In Final Countdown, his Haos Brontes was thrown out by Mylene, together with her Aquos Elico, as she thinks that Bakugan with feelings are useless. Although he was furious, he still left without Brontes, proving Mira's theory that he is brainless. He later flees to Vestal with the Vexos, Prince Hydron, and Professor Clay, leaving Spectra and Gus. He makes his reappearance in Spectra Rises, at first challenging Dan and the brawlers still in possession of Elemental Energies, but backs when Spectra appears, and Gus taunts him by saying he stole Brontes' soul. It is shown Volt seems to believe in doing the honorable thing, saying, "I won't kick a man when he's down," after Dan defeats Spectra, and is seemingly weakened by the battle. Later, Volt challenges Gus to a brawl to win Brontes back, revealing his mechanical Bakugan Haos Boriates. However, he is defeated by Gus. In Samurai Showdown, Volt challenges Shun for the Ventus attribute energy. But Volt is defeated by the combined efforts of Shun and Baron. In Volt's Revolt Volt does not agree with King Zenoheld's plan to destroy all living things that stand up against him and returns home showing some of his past to the audience in the process. He is shortly thereafter confronted and challenged by Prince Hydron, Volt wins the ensuing Brawl and then starts to leave not before scarring Hydron by telling Boriates to nearly crush him. As payback, Hydron throws a grenade in front of Volt, which opens a dimensional port beneath him, sending him into a far dimension. As Volt sinks into the portal, he vows that Hydron will get what's coming to him for all the suffering he has caused innocent people. Volt later appears in Hydron's dreams/hallucinations along with Lync in An Heir To Spare. His fate is unknown.

==== Lync Volan ====
Voiced by: Matsuri Mizuguchi (Japanese); Robert Tinkler (English)

Lync is a Ventus brawler. He used a mechanical Ventus Altair as his Guardian Bakugan, and a mechanical Ventus Wired as a Trap Bakugan. Altair and Wired are able to combine into Meta Altair. However, in Gate Crashers, Altair and Wired were damaged beyond repair, and did not brawl for the rest of the arc. He was a spy for Prince Hydron on Spectra and Gus. He and Volt Luster were the Vexos' tag team champions. He gets defeated by Dan in Invasion of the Vestals, and then again in episode 9 by Ace and Shun in the Bakugan Battle Tournament. He then gets defeated by Baron in episode 11. He went to Earth with Spectra, Gus, Dan, Mira, and Baron. He was stuck on Earth with Alice after rejecting Dan's hospitality. He is seen crying at the end of episode 11. Baron called him 'a little weasel' in episode 11. In the same episode, Gus calls him a snake. He has his Gauntlet taken away by Dr. Gehabich in order to fix his dimension transporter without Lync realizing it (although it would not have mattered, as his Bakugan were destroyed anyhow). Lync eventually makes it home after swearing loyalty to Spectra and when Prince Hydron asked him to spy on Spectra, Lync denies him and helps Spectra with his "ultimate plan". But he then betrays Spectra by locking up Gus so he cannot tell his master of Mylene's escape plan. It is obvious he will do whatever is best for him (going as far as to claim behind Hydron's back "You can count on me to do what's best for me." He later openly admits that he's "very loyal to three people: me, myself and I" in conversation with Volt and the other Vexos), due to his multiple betrayals throughout the series. He later flees to Vestal with the Vexos, Prince Hydron, and Professor Clay, leaving Spectra and Gus. He reappears to battle Shun after Zenoheld launches a prototype for the Bakugan Termination System, but is defeated by the combined efforts of Skyress, and a newly evolved Ingram. In Earth Invaders, Lync and Mylene battle Runo and Mira and succeed in obtaining the Subterra attribute energy. He later brawls Ace and Marucho alongside Shadow, taking the Darkus energy. Lync does love Alice. It was this that finally caused him to leave the Vexos when Zenoheld declared that the alternative would be used to wipe out Vestal, Earth, and New Vestroia (may have been a likely target as Zenoheld had a grudge against the Bakguan, although it was not mentioned in the list of targets) and anyone else that opposed him. After Volt's departure and "demise" at Hydron's hand, Lync copied the Blue Prints of the alternative to give to Alice (who would warn the resistance). He hesitates to speak to her, feeling guilty about his betrayal of her trust. However, he resolves to speak to her. However, Hydron appears on the scene (Professor Clay had discovered that Lync had made an unauthorised copy, which Mylene overheard him saying, she reported the incident to Zenoheld, who sent Hydron after Lync) and challenges him to a battle. Lync puts up a heroic and close fight but Aluze is destroyed by Dryoid and he is banished with a death bomb by Hydron (but not before throwing his glove with the data disk towards Alice's home, where she found it later outside, once the battle and its combatants had disappeared from the scene). Lync later appears in Hydron's dreams/hallucinations along with Volt in An Heir To Spare. His fate is unknown.

=== Twelve Order ===
==== Emperor Barodius / Mag Mel ====
Voiced by: Ken Narita (Japanese); Shawn Meunier (English)

The central villain of the third season, and one of the two main villains of the fourth season (alongside Coredegon). The Emperor of Gundalia, leader of the Twelve Orders and also a Darkus Brawler. He was born to a family that has ruled Gundalia for a long time. He is the leader of the Twelve Orders that seek to conquer Neathia. He has been able to rule Gundalia due to his overwhelming strength and special ability to simultaneously execute battles. His sole desires are: to obtain the secret DNA Code from the Bakugan that possess it and create the most powerful Bakugan in the universe. His other goal is to take Neathia's Sacred Orb so he can rule the universe. His Bakugan partner is Dharak. Gill is his longtime childhood friend and most trusted confidant, but when Barodius found out that Gill killed Kazarina, he had Phantom Dharak destroy Gill, Airzel, Stoica and their Bakugan. His quiet and calm demeanour masks his hot-tempered and devious nature.

He is highly arrogant but also highly intelligent. Barodius and Phantom Dharak have a final showdown with Dan and Drago and in the end, they lost to Dan and Drago. Refusing to admit defeat, Barodius and Phantom Dharak start to take the power of the Sacred Orb only for Code Eve to banish them inside a flip world of Bakugan Interspace, their hatred and desire exposed to the Sacred Orb causing them to mutate into steel-armored forms that soon would be known as Mag Mel and Razenoid, although the Brawlers at first believed that the two had been killed after Dharak absorbed too much of the Sacred Orb's powers. From that point onwards, he kept his desire to take the Gate and Key to control the Mechtogan and Bakugan in existence. He was killed by Drago in the episode "The Final Takedown".

==== Kazarina ====
Voiced by: Kimiko Saitō (Japanese); Linda Ballantyne (English)

Member of the Twelve Orders. She's a Haos Brawler. She is sly as she is cold-hearted and is always by Emperor Barodius' side. She works as the Director of the Bakugan Biological Research Center, where she secretly undergoes cruel living body experiments to heighten the abilities of Bakugan. Her goal is to develop abilities that will rival the Neathians. She is an exceptional scientist who has unraveled the mysteries of Bakugan evolution. She can also hypnotize others to do her bidding, as shown with Jake and Coredem. She is heartless and selfish, as she would sacrifice one of her own subordinates to use as a scapegoat without losing any sleep on it. Another example of her cruelty was shown in a battle before the series began when she killed a number of Neathian soldiers, including the previous commander of the Castle Knights and Fabia's fiancé Jin before capturing Aranaut and sadistically experimenting on him. Her Bakugan partner is Lumagrowl. Kazarina is killed by Gill in the middle of Broken Spell and her spell on everybody is broken. When Lumagrowl hears about Kazarina's death, he leaves in sadness. His final, mournful howl over her death is heard echoing.

==== Gill ====
Voiced by: Hikaru Midorikawa (Japanese); Scott Gorman (English)

Member of the Twelve Orders. He's a Pyrus Brawler. Gill is a calm, cool warrior who pledges his undying loyalty to Emperor Barodius. He was orphaned at a young age and raised by the Emperor's family, seeing Barodius as an older brother. He will follow Barodius' orders without considering whether it is right or wrong. He is a teacher and trainer of Airzel, who shares a Spectra-Gus relationship with him. This relationship is also shown between him and Barodius, with Barodius in the "Spectra" role and Gill in the "Gus" role (reverse of his relationship with Airzel). It is shown that many times in the series he distrusts Kazarina, and he shares a mutual hatred with her, as well as fighting over Barodius's favor. His Bakugan is Krakix. He first appears in Revelation, where he and the rest of the Twelve Orders discuss how powerful Drago truly is. In The Secret Package, he, Airzel, and Kazarina join their brainwashed battlers against the Neathian Castle Knights. In The Element, Gill reports to Emperor Barodius that their Gundalian forces took down the second shield and Neathia's front line. In The Sacred Orb, Gill and Krakix battle against Captain Elright and Raptorix, but as Drago and Dharak come face to face, the Sacred Orb teleports the Twelve Orders back to Gundalia. In Battle For the Second Shield, before Lena leaves for Neathia with Kazarina, Gill tells her to watch her back around Kazarina, for she is loyal to no one but herself and would think of nothing of sacrificing one of her subordinates to save herself. After reporting to Barodius, she runs into Gill, letting him know of Lena's betrayal, suggesting that someone may have told her what she had planned for her. Gill replies that she got lucky today and that you never know who you can trust.

In Dream Escape, Ren leaves the battle to join Dan, Fabia, and Jake, but Gill follows him as well. As the Twelve Orders reunite, they prepare to attack the Brawlers. In Gundalian Showdown, Gill, Kazarina, Stoica, and Airzel battle against the Brawlers. Just as it seems that Gill has defeated Drago, he comes out unscratched. Drago defeats him with Spire Dragon, as well as Stoica and Airzel, but not Kazarina. After the Brawlers leave for Neathia, Gill orders Stoica and Airzel to follow them. He did not go because "his ship was damaged by the Brawlers". In Broken Spell, Kazarina, looking for her sword, finds Gill, holding her sword. Gill says they need to talk about things, but Kazarina just scolds him to stay in his place. Then Gill, using Kazarina's sword, kills Kazarina, telling her to watch what she says, for words have consequences. In Code Eve, Gill and Krakix, having spotted Fabia, Nurzak, and Mason, try to keep them from returning to Neathia, but they escape on Nurzak's ship. Just as he makes it to Neathia, Gill apologizes to Emperor Barodius for being late and tells him that Kazarina was taken down in battle by Fabia. But Barodius knows it was he who finished off Kazarina. For his betrayal, Barodius has Phantom Dharak attack Gill, along with Airzel and Strikeflier, who try to protect him but are all killed.

==== Airzel ====
Voiced by: Eiji Miyashita (Japanese); Lyon Smith (English)

Member of the Twelve Orders. He's a Ventus Brawler. Emperor Barodius and Gill recruited Airzel to be a warrior, and Airzel continues his battle training with Gill. He lurks in the shadows, to protect Barodius who chose him personally to be part of the 'Twelve Orders'. Airzel is the leading expert in enemy surveillance and information analysis. He always takes matters seriously, which causes him to be annoyed by Stocia's laid-back personality. Airzel is the #1 trainer on the Special Bakugan Team. His Bakugan partner is Strikeflier. He is fierce, confident, and reckless. He first appears in Revelation, where he and the rest of the Twelve Orders discuss how powerful Drago truly is. In The Secret Package, he, Gill, and Kazarina join the brainwashed battlers from Earth against the Neathian Castle Knights. After sending Linus to Earth with the Element, Elright is confronted by Airzel, asking him where the Element is. In The Element, Airzel reports to Emperor Barodius that they had captured Captain Elright, but his interrogation has not been successful. In The Sacred Orb, Airzel battles against Shun, and having blended in with the surroundings, gained the upper hand. Just as Drago and Dharak are about to face each other, the Sacred Orb teleports the Twelve Orders back to Gundalia. In Decoy Unit, Airzel volunteers to attack Neathia and take down the third shield, taking Mason with him too, as a chance to redeem himself. With their Gundalian forces and battlers from Earth, Airzel and Mason battle against Marucho and Jake. When the battle gets intense, Marucho and Akwimos trap Strikeflier and Avior in a block of ice, with Marucho and Jake escaping Airzel and Mason. In Mobile Assault, Gill, Stoica, and Airzel lead a front line of brainwashed battlers against the Neathians. In Colossus Dharak, Airzel and Strikeflier battle Shun and Hawktor, but when Fabia intervenes, Kazarina steps in to help Airzel. In Dragonoid Colossus, Airzel and Shun continue their battle, both using Battle Gear. Just as Hawktor takes out Lumagrowl, Strikeflier sneaks up on him and Shun and finishes them off. When Linehalt unleashes his Forbidden Power, the Twelve Orders retreat back to Gundalia. In Infiltrated, Emperor Barodius orders Gill and Airzel to separate Dan from Marucho and Shun. Gill and Airzel begin to battle Marucho and Shun, who have fallen for their trap. When Gill is prepared to take on Hawktor, he finishes off Airzel, but Gill defeats both Marucho and Shun. Before Gill and Airzel can take them away, Shun throws down a smoke ball, letting Shun and Marucho escape. In Final Strike, Airzel takes on Marucho as the Brawlers make their way to Dan. In Gundalian Showdown, Gill, Kazarina, Stoica, and Airzel battle the Brawlers to keep them from leaving Gundalia, but are all defeated by Drago's Spire Dragon, all but Kazarina. Just as the Brawlers take their leave, Stoica and Airzel prepare to leave for Neathia, but when Stoica wonders where Gill is, Airzel tells him that the Brawlers damaged his ship and told them to go on ahead. In Broken Spell, Stoica and Airzel reach Neathia, keeping Dan and Shun away from Barodius. After Kazarina's spell breaks, Stoica reveals that on the way to his ship, he saw Airzel and Gill talking about Kazarina. Airzel admits to Stoica that it was Gill that killed Kazarina, not Fabia, with Barodius listening in on them, thanks to Stoica's speakerphone being on. In Code Eve, Airzel realizes that Barodius was listening in on his conversation with Stoica, who had his speakerphone on. Just as Dharak prepares to attack Gill, Airzel and Strikeflier fly to his ship to protect him, but are killed along with Gill by Dharak's attack.

==== Stoica ====
Voiced by: Mitsuki Saiga (Japanese); Mike Kiss (English)

Member of the Twelve Orders. He's an Aquos Brawler. He has a split personality: one of an angel, the other the devil, which can change in a second. Stoica is usually calm and pompous, but when he is irritated, he will need a lot to calm him down. Stoica has many trick moves during battle and opponents have a hard time reading him. He has saved Gundalia many times with ingenious battling abilities. He is the youngest member of the Twelve Orders. His Bakugan partner is Lythirus. He is the only member of the Twelve Orders to show his human form. In Broken Spell, Stoica and Airzel reach Neathia, keeping Dan and Shun away from Barodius. After Kazarina's spell breaks, Stoica reveals that on the way to his ship, he saw Airzel and Gill talking about Kazarina. Airzel admits to Stoica that it was Gill that killed Kazarina, not Fabia, with Barodius listening in on them, thanks to Stoica's speakerphone being on. In Code Eve, Airzel realizes that Barodius was listening in on his conversation with Stoica, who had his speakerphone on. Stoica and Lythirius attack Dragonoid Colossus with acid bubbles in his eyes, blinding him in the process. But Dharak attacks Dragonoid Colossus with Stoica and Lythirius still on him, killing them all.

=== Chaos Army ===
==== Anubias ====
Voiced by: Rob Greenway

Anubias was the leader of the team of the same name and an artificial creation of Barodius whose appearance resembled that of a Gundalian. He was a Darkus Brawler. Anubias was a competitive brawler willing to fight at any challenge. While not entirely a bad person, he looked down on those with weaknesses or excuses. He appeared to have a want to destroy Dan. Mag Mel absorbed and killed him in "Unfinished Business". He was mourned over by Noah and Dan, who vowed that Mag Mel would not get away with what he'd done.

==== Sellon ====
Voiced by: Katie Griffin

Sellon was the leader of the team of the same name, and was the artificial creation of Barodius that resembled the appearance of a Neathian. She was a Ventus Brawler. Sellon had a mysterious personality and a serious attitude towards brawling. She loved style and grace in a battle and lived by honor. Unlike most Neathians, whose form is mainly blue and white, Sellon's is black, with tentacle-like hair. She also has 6 eye-looking adornments on her chest, much like the Chaos Bakugan. At the end of "Dangerous Beauty", she stole Dan's key and gave it to Mag Mel but was then absorbed and violently killed by him.

== Secondary characters ==
=== Allies ===
==== Gus Grav ====
Voiced by: Yūki Kaji (Japanese); Chris McCawley (English)

Gus is the Vexos' second strongest player, a Subterra brawler and devotes all his free time to training. He uses Subterra Primo Vulcan as his main Bakugan and Hexados as his Trap Bakugan. He only answers to Spectra. He is said to be a weasel throughout the series, and "Spectra's little pet" and "Spectra's lapdog" by the other members of the Vexos, like Mylene and Lync. He was shown to be fond of the different things on Earth such as 'juice in boxes', but the planet made him uncomfortable. In episode 5, it was shown that before he joined the Vexos, he battled Spectra in the finals of the Bakugan Battle Tournament and lost. He was then offered a place in the Vexos by Spectra, which he gladly accepted. He admired Spectra a great deal and he felt that Spectra must be respected at all costs. He was shown to hate Lync because of his cheekiness. When the Vestal Palace was self-destructing, he gathered Elico and Brontes who were thrown into the ship chamber and saved Spectra and Cyborg Helios. He did not return to Vestal, but he lived with Spectra on the ship. Gus later was challenged by Volt to a battle but won with Brontes. After the battle, he returned to Spectra, but not before tossing Brontes through the teleporter back to New Vestroia. In Avenging Spectra, Gus took King Zenoheld hostage and then battled him but when he used his attack Aquos Blast Elico (formerly used by Maylene) sacrificed himself for Gus then later in the battle Hexados sacrificed himself for Subterra Rex Vulcan then both Gus and Rex Vulcan fall defeated in battle. Since then, Spectra had vowed to avenge him. Gus was thought to have died until 10 episodes later when it was later revealed that he survived and was placed in a cell, though how he survived was not explained. He later escaped and helped Spectra battle Zenoheld who was trying to stop Zenoheld's new weapon. Gus later made a comeback in Mechtanium Surge, though he only appeared in Episodes 25 and 26, where he teamed up with Spectra to defeat Mag Mel's Chaos Bakugan.

==== Linus Claude ====
Voiced by: Tatsuhisa Suzuki (Japanese); Tyrone Savage (English)

A Pyrus brawler and Castle Knight from Neathia. When the Gundalians break through the second shield, Captain Elright sends Linus to Earth to give him the Element within his partner, Pyrus Neo Zip Zam. When he arrives, he meets Shun, who thinks he is Gundalian at first but realizes he is Neathian after Jesse and Ren challenge them to a battle, saying that any friend of Fabia's is a friend of his. Despite Zip Zam's power, they are both overwhelmed by Jesse and Zip Zam is taken. Linus, injured, is taken back to the brawlers while Dan heads out to win back Zip Zam. However, during that battle, Zip Zam gives the Element to Drago and subsequently dies. Zip Zam appears one final time in Linus' dream to say goodbye. Though saddened by the loss of his partner, Linus accepts that is it what he would have wanted. He returns to Neathia with the Brawlers. Much later in the series, Pyrus Rubanoid, Sid Arkale's partner before he died, accepts Linus as his new partner.

==== Elright ====
Voiced by: Yuichi Nakamura (Japanese); Graeme Cornies (English)

Elright is the Captain of the Neathian forces. He is captured by Airzel and interrogated but promptly escapes in time to join Fabia in battle. He is usually found fighting against the Gundalians or debriefing the brawlers on their next mission.

In Mechtanium Surge, Elright is still the captain of the Castle Knights and is the one who leads them to aid Gundalia. Elright has become partners with Haos Aranaut and the two fought together against the chaos bakugan on Gundalia.

==== Nurzak ====
Voiced by: Hidekatsu Shibata (Japanese); Hadley Kay (English)

A former member of the Twelve Orders who is a Subterra Brawler, and the oldest Gundalian living, as he served Barodius's father (the previous Emperor), he is a scholarly and wise intellectual. Despite being the oldest of the Twelve Orders, he has the most physical energy. He is the #1 officer of the Twelve Orders and is very good at analyzing the opponent, planning strategy and evaluating the situation. His Bakugan partner is Sabator. In "Mechtanium Surge", he is now the first Prime Minister of Gundalia.

==== Kato ====
Voiced by: Masaharu Satō (Japanese); Ron Pardo (English)

Marucho's butler. He has always helped the Brawlers and flies Marucho anywhere. Hal-G once tried to trick the brawlers by impersonating Kato, but Shun found out when he did not say "Master Marucho." He is also very polite. Kato also appears many times in Bakugan: New Vestroia assisting the Brawlers once again (even when Marucho is not there). Kato appears in the 1st and 2nd seasons. He did appear in the 10 episode in season 3.

He also appears in Mechtanium Surge at the end of the episode Back in Sync with Marucho's father at the end of Marucho's battle with Jack and praises Marucho on his battle. Near the end of the series, he was going to take Mira, Runo, and Julie to meet up with Dan and the others, but is killed when Bakugan City is wiped off the map by Mechtavius Destroyer. However, thanks to the surviving Nonents sacrificing themselves, Dan, Shun, and Marucho are able to use the Current of Time to travel back and prevent Kato's death by destroying Mechtavius Destroyer for good.

==== Top Brawlers ====
The Top Brawlers are the top five Bakugan Battle Brawlers who were mind-controlled by Masquerade and Naga to take out Dan Kuso's group. They were freed from Masquerade's control and later helped Dan's group in their fight against Naga's forces and the Vexos.

===== Klaus Von Herzon =====
Voiced by: Takayuki Kondō (Japanese); Jeremy Harris (English)

The 2nd rank brawler that appeared in episode 14, and was recruited by Masquerade. He uses Aquos attribute Bakugan and his guardian Bakugan is Aquos Sirenoid. Klaus sent Marucho's prized and caring Preyas to the Doom Dimension. Aquos Sirenoid is sent to the Doom Dimension in Episode 26. He is reunited with her sometime around episodes 29 and 42, and both attempt to attain revenge on Alice after she confesses to having been Masquerade, but also to teach her a valuable lesson when she intended to avoid Bakugan altogether because of the trauma she suffered from her evil acts she committed as Masquerade. He fights the Haos/Subterra hybrid Rabeeder with Alice and Christopher in episode 47.

In New Vestroia, he owns Condo Apartments and is in the condo business shown on Vestal in episode 29, having moved to Vestal to maintain his business there with Sirenoid. He helps Ace beat Mylene also in the episode. After that, he stays in Vestal and doesn't appear in Gundailian Invaders. In the first season, it seems like he has a bit of a crush on Alice.

===== Chan Lee =====
See: Chan Lee

Voiced by: Miyuki Sawashiro (Japanese); Stephanie Anne Mills (English)

The 3rd rank brawler hailing from China that appeared in episode 14, and was recruited by Masquerade. She uses Pyrus attribute Bakugan and her guardian Bakugan is Pyrus Fortress. Dan Kuso beat her on episode 16. Pyrus Fortress is sent to the Doom Dimension in Episode 26. After Masquerade beat her, her ranking went down to 5th place. She is reunited with him sometime around episodes 32 and 36. She fights a hybrid and loses. In episode 51 she battled Naga and easily loses. Her age is not revealed but it might be somewhere around 12-15. It is hinted that she has a crush on Joe, as she knew him personally whereas others knew him only as a webmaster and she appeared to protect him and Wavern from Naga.

She was sent by Klaus to fight alongside Alice in New Vestroia and loses against Shadow Prove. Chan does not appear in any other episode but episode 32.

===== Julio Santana =====
Voiced by: Tsuguo Mogami (Japanese); Dan Petronijevic (English)

The 4th rank brawler that appeared in episode 14, and was recruited by Masquerade. He loses a battle with Runo and Dan in episode 18. He used Haos Tentaclear in battle. Haos Tentaclear is sent to the Doom Dimension in Episode 26. He is reunited with him sometime around episodes 32 and 36.

===== Komba O'Charlie =====
Voiced by: Marina Inoue (Japanese); Julie Lemieux (English)

The 5th rank brawler that appeared in episode 14, and was recruited by Masquerade. He uses Ventus attribute Bakugan and his guardian Bakugan is Ventus Harpus. Komba lost to Shun in episode 15. Ventus Harpus is sent into the Doom Dimension in Episode 26. He is reunited with her sometime around episodes 32 and 36.

===== Billy Gilbert =====
Voiced by: Kiyotaka Furushima (Japanese); Bailey Stocker (English)

Julie's childhood friend, and a top 15 brawler. He uses Subterra attribute Bakugan and his guardian Bakugan is Subterra Cycloid. He defeated Julie in episode 10 but later lost in a rematch. In episode 14 it is shown that Billy increased his rank from top 20 to top 10, and was recruited by Masquerade and lost to Julie in episode 15 again. Subterra Cycloid is sent to the Doom Dimension in Episode 26. He is reunited with him sometime around episodes 32 and 36. He also fights a hybrid in Episode 47 and starts dating Julie at the end of the season.

Billy returns in New Vestroia and battles with Julie in episode 37 to test Bakugan Interspace and loses.

=== Families ===
==== Miyoko Kuso ====
Voiced by: Ayumi Tsunematsu (Japanese); Alyson Court (English)

Dan's mother. Her usual past times are watching TV and doing yoga. She appears to be a typical stay-at-home mom, always doing the cooking and cleaning. At the beginning of the series, Miyoko became concerned about her son's latest hobby. She found out about Bakugan when she was cleaning Dan's room. Mrs. Kuso found a Bakugan ball on a table, dropped it and it turned out to be a Pyrus Griffon. She soon feared something was going on when Dan gave her a frog keychain for her birthday only to not come home afterward and asks Runo and even Masquerade. When Dan comes back, she and the rest of the brawlers' parents were informed of what was going on and let him go to Vestroia with the others to stop Naga. In New Vestroia, Dan calls her in episode 12 when he returns to Earth. In episode 14 when Dan comes into the house she goes over to hug him only to be greeted by Baron, who she called a sweetie. She then gets Mira to join her in doing some yoga, which Mira apparently did not like. Mira said, "Is this some Earth torture?" She continues to appear until Dan goes back to New Vestroia. She allows him to go, though she gets a bit worried about him once he leaves. She also appears in the first episode of Gundalian Invaders.

==== Shinjiro Kuso ====
Voiced by: Takayuki Kondō (Japanese); Ron Pardo (English)

Dan's father. He is a typical working dad who works for a businessman. He loves pudding up to the point of an unhealthy obsession and will go crazy if he gets it from someone (especially vanilla flavored). Later he and the rest of the brawlers' parents were informed of what was going on and let him go to Vestroia with the others to stop Naga. He does not appear that much in New Vestroia but in one of his appearances, he joked about Mira being Dan's new girlfriend.

==== Tatsuo Misaki ====
Voiced by: Tsuguo Mogami (Japanese); Ron Pardo (English)

Runo's father and owner of their family cafe alongside his wife Saki Misaki. He has a tendency to smother Runo and the cafe is filled with pictures of her and his actions as an over-protective parent get on Runo and his wife's nerves. However, he is very devoted to his family and loves them very much. While he does accept it when a girl does a bad job or breaks a few dishes but he does not like it when there is a bad male waiter in his cafe such as Baron, who had evidently spilled several times. He is seen crying in the preview for episode 43 while hugging Runo this shows just how much he loves his daughter.

==== Saki Misaki ====
Voiced by: Akane Murakami (Japanese); Deann Degruijter (English)

Runo's mother and part-owner of the Misaki's cafe where all of the girls work. She is married to Tatsuo Misaki. She tends to respond negatively towards her husband's actions such as when she has Baron sweep the front porch and she has mentioned that he has put her in therapy. However, they both love Runo very much and they support her no matter what. They have dedicated their cafe to Runo. All around their cafe, they have pictures of Runo. She embarrasses her a lot.

==== Kyosuke and Shouko Marukura ====
Kyosuke Marukura Voiced by: Atsushi Ono (Japanese); Ron Pardo (English)
Shouko Marukura Voiced by: Fuyuka Oura (Japanese); Julie Lemieux (English)

Marucho's parents. Kyosuke is a developer and makes his millions by bulldozing homes to create vacant space, especially schools. He is a millionaire as well and his wife collects things such as art and endangered species. He has a factory that creates Bakugan wrist launchers, made especially for the Bakugan Battle Brawlers, which his son is a part of.

==== Daisy Makimoto ====
Voiced by: Fuyuka Oura (Japanese); Annick Obonsawin (30), Katie Griffin (39) (English)

Julie's older, prettier sister. When Julie was young, Daisy always bested her at everything but she would always help Julie whenever she would fail. An Illusionary Daisy was summoned to battle her for a test with Clayf.

==== Shiori Kazami ====
Voiced by: Ao Takahashi (Japanese); Caroly Larson (English)

Shun's mother. The reason for Shun's grimness since his mom is comatose (in the English version). (Although in the Japanese version, she's noted to be dead.) Before sleeping, she waited to see Shun. After Shun thinks his mom is dead the doctor says she is just tired which turned out to be true. After Shun's initial relief, he finds a Bakugan in his mother's hand; this turned out to be Skyress, a strong and rare Bakugan. She gave this to Shun because she knew that Shun was interested in Bakugan not in ninja lessons. It is unknown if she is alive. Skyress was given to Shun to look after him since she cannot look after him herself. When Oberus gave Shun his test, she used an illusionary form of a young Shun's Mother who always wanted to play with Shun, the final game she wanted to play with him, was Bakugan. She made Shun almost want to stay with her since he wanted his mother to be healthy again and he wanted to stay with her.

==== Shun's Grandfather ====
Voiced by: Tsuguo Mogami (Japanese); Aron Tager (English)

He wants Shun to be a ninja, not a Bakugan player. Shun lives with him. His house resembles a dojo and has many traps installed inside. He seems to want Shun to be a ninja, as he was once a greatly skilled ninja. Shun came to live with him after his mother had to stay at the hospital after being ill. He is very fussy at times. Shun does go out with him at regular times though, as seen when he shows his grandfather through the city. In the English dub, he is stated to be 85 years old.

==== Michael Gehabich ====
Voiced by: Masaharu Satō (Japanese); Ron Pardo (English)

Alice Gehabich's grandfather and is the one who opened the portal to Vestroia and exposed humans to the different types of Bakugan. Similar to how Alice is Masquerade he has a more negative, evil form, which is Hal-G, and for most of the first series he is seen in this form. He turns into Hal-G when a huge amount of negative energy from the Silent Core infiltrates his lab. He is cured by the end of the first and second seasons. He is first seen in Moscow with Alice, fixing the gate to New Vestroia. When he tests it by sending a Russian doll, it fails to teleport he tries it with a Gate Card and it teleports. However, unknown to him or Alice, it sent thousands of gate cards into New Vestroia, one of which is caught by Spectra and given to Professor Clay. Later Michael used the technology of Lync's gauntlet to fix the gate thus preventing Alice, Runo and Julie from going to New Vestroia along with Dan and Baron, as they did not have gauntlets which were required to be able to enter.

==== Ben Gehabich ====
Alice's uncle.

==== Clara Gehabich ====
Voiced by: Julie Lemieux

Alice's aunt.

==== Mrs. Brown ====
Voiced by: Ao Takahashi (Japanese); Daniela Lama (English)

Joe's mother.

==== Maron Leltoy ====
Voiced by: Tae Okajima (Japanese); Stacey DePass (English)

Baron Leltoy's younger sister and the second oldest of the Letloy siblings. She lives with her family on Vestal. She first appeared in episode 28 with Baron's other siblings and appears to show some worry to Baron before he left to meet with Ace and after he lost to Prince Hydron. She appeared again when Baron and the rest of the Resistance had to leave for Earth. In episode 36, Maron uses the Dimension Transporter to visit Baron on Earth. Baron takes her to an amusement park where she showed a lot of excitement. While Baron was showing her how to use a Gauntlet, they accidentally ended up in a battle against Volt Luster (who was battling Shun Kazami). After joining the battle, Maron was watching from a safe distance until some of the attacks landed near her. When she was falling from her lookout post Shun saved her. After the battle before she left for home, she gave Shun a kiss on the cheek for saving her. Maron is the main sibling of Baron. It is unknown whether all of Baron's other siblings have a name that rhymes with Baron's, only three other names are known besides Baron and Maron.

==== Serena Sheen ====
Voiced by: Fuyuka Oura (Japanese); Julie Lemieux (English)

Fabia's older sister and the Queen of Neathia. Not one to crumble under pressure, Serena goes and sends Fabia to Earth to get help against The Gundalians. In addition, she calls the ancient and legendary "antimatter energy" to cover her home world. However, the Emperor of Gundalia uses his Bakugan Dharak to break down the shield to steal and absorb the energy's power. Serena's biggest challenge is to keep Neathia running smoothly and keep the people calm and safe while waiting for Fabia and the Brawlers to help take down Barodius. In "Mechtanium Surge", she is revealed to be the Ambassador of Neathia and Gundalia. In order for this to happen, she resigned as Queen, thus giving the throne to Fabia.

=== Enemies ===
==== Gundalian Agents ====
===== Sid Arkale =====
Voiced by: Tsuguo Mogami (Japanese); Kyle MacDonald (English)

Sid Arkale was a Pyrus brawler from Gundalia. He is partnered with Pyrus Rubanoid and his Battle Gear is Destrakon Gear. Sid has a feeling of doubt like he does not think Emperor Barodius's decision to let Ren handle the Battle Brawlers is a good idea. He first appears in "Revelation" with Lena Isis battling against Dan and Marucho. Although they managed to defeat Marucho, they lose to Dan and Drago with his Level 2 Battle Gear. In "Confrontation", after he failed to recruit new kids for the Gundalians, Sid battles alongside Zenet Surrow against Dan and Ren and beat them, but was later told to leave the Battle Brawlers to Ren. In "Hostile Takeover", Sid battles with Casey, a brainwashed kid, against Marucho and Jake, but loses. In "The Element", Sid steals a sealed Neo Zipzam from Ren, who tries to take it back, and he decides to battle Dan, but after throwing Neo onto the arena, he loses the battle to a newly evolved Drago. After retreating back to Gundalia, Rubanoid attempts to attack Emperor Barodius, but is struck down by Krakix and taken away by Kazarina for research. After Ren pleads mercy from the Emperor, Sid faces is fate as the Emperor disposes of him. In "Sid Returns", Sid, who awakes from a deep sleep, finds himself, Lena, Jesse and Zenet trapped in Kazarina's Lab. As Sid escapes her lab, he sees Ren alongside Gundalian soldiers running towards Gundalian transport ships. As Dan and Ren battle each other, Sid, disguised as a Gundalian soldier, joins the battle alongside Ren, but loses. After catching up with Ren, Sid is fired on by Dharak, but is saved by Ren. He then hands Rubanoid to Ren and releases his grip, falling to his death. In "Forgiveness", Sid was mentioned and shown in a flashback while Ren was battling Fabia with Rubanoid to join the Battle Brawlers or stay with the Gundalians. It is unknown if Sid survived his fall from the cliff. Unlike most Gundalian brawlers, Sid was barely seen in his Gundalian form throughout the series.

===== Lena Isis =====
Voiced by: Naomi Shindō (Japanese); Lisette St. Louis (English)

Lena Isis is an Aquos brawler from Gundalia. She is partnered with Aquos Phosphos and his Battle Gear is Terrorcrest. She is an intelligent, strategic brawler and is calm, and collective in a battle. She is also clever and does not suffer from arrogance like her teammates. She first appears in "Revelation" alongside Sid Arcale against Dan and Marucho, but both lose to Drago because of his Level 2 Battle Gear. In "Confrontation", she and Mason manage to recruit some top-ranked brawlers by using their non-Guardian Bakugan and lose, thus proving they are powerful brawlers. They then bring the two kids back to Gundalia, in which Kazarina hypnotizes them. In "Escape From Darkness", she and Zenet battle Fabia and Avatar Marucho. Lena was clever enough to realize that Marucho's Aranaut was a digital clone, but did not realize that Marucho was an avatar, not until Ren put his and Marucho's conversation on the arena's big screen, letting Lena and Zenet that they are battling a clone. After that, Lena and Zenet defeat the Avatar Marucho and Fabia. They then try to take Fabia back to Gundalia, but escape Bakugan Interspace when Marucho arrives. In "The Sacred Orb", Ren, Lena, Zenet, Mason, and Jesse, in their true forms, were being talked down to by the Twelve Orders. Before heading for Neathia in "Battle For the Second Shield", Lena is warned by Gill to watch her back around Kazarina, for she is loyal to no one but herself and would think nothing of sacrificing one of her subordinates to save herself. Once on Neathia, she, alongside Kazarina, battle against Shun and Drago, but lose when Dan and Hawktor arrive. After retreating back to Gundalia, Lena and Phosphos attempt to ambush Kazarina, knowing she would sell her out to save herself, but her plan fails when Lumagrowl takes down Phosphos and Kazarina finishes her off. She is then seen unconscious in "Sid Returns", along with Sid, Zenet, and Jesse. In "Redemption", Ren and Mason sneak into Kazarina's Lab to rescue Lena, Zenet, and Jesse, but find that no one is inside. As she is battling against Fabia and Nurzak, Kazarina reveals a surprise to them: Lena, Zenet, and Jesse, all hypnotized. But once Stoica has Lythirius flood the battlefield, Kazarina has Lumagrowl retreat, along with Lena, Zenet, and Jesse. In "Dream Escape" and "Gundalian Showdown", Emperor Barodius brings Zenet, Jesse, and Lena with him as he invades Neathia and has them fight the Castle Knights. In "Broken Spell", they fight against the Brawlers just as they return to Neathia. But when Gill kills Kazarina, her spell is broken and Lena, Zenet, and Jesse are finally free. After the Brawlers fill them in on everything that has happened up until now, they decide to join them and fight against the Emperor. In "Code Eve", Ren and his teammates prepare for their attack on the Emperor. But their plan fails as Phosphos is strucken down by Phantom Dharak.

===== Mason Brown =====
Voiced by: Daichi Endō (Japanese); Juilan Osen (English)

An agent from Gundalia. He's a Subterra Brawler. In episode 4, he battled a random kid with a Raptorix and won. He then defeated Jake and later lost on the second match of him and Jake.

In episode 5, he and Lena Isis lost to two top-ranked players while using their non-Guardian Bakugan to test their strength. The kids were then brought back to the Twelve Orders and hypnotized by Kazarina in order to recruit them.

In episode 8, he faces Dan Kuso and Shun Kazami in a tag brawl with Taylor. He lost this battle even with his Battle Gear.

In Episode 14, he makes a small appearance along with all of Ren's crew getting chewed out because the brawlers have joined Neathia.

In episode 15, he revealed his actual form and tagged with Airzel against Marucho and Jake. It ended in a tie after Marucho and Jake fled the battle after Marucho used Akwimos's last ability, which froze Avior and Strikeflier, distracting the two Gundalians.

He and Ren have a strange password they use. Mason starts by saying "Why does Barodius wear suspenders?" and Ren answers "To keep his pants up."

===== Zenet Surrow =====
Voiced by: Yuka Saitō (Japanese); Barbara Mamabolo (English)

An agent from Gundalia. She's a Haos Brawler. She first appeared in episode 5, and battled against Dan Kuso and Ren Krawler alongside Sid Arcale. She managed to defeat Ren and Dan, but ended up sacrificing Contestir to negate Drago's Battle Gear.

In episode 7, she teases Ren by saying "Aw, how adorable," because he made friends with the Brawlers and that he forgot who he is and he said that she and the other moles work for him.

In episode 10, she and Lena Isis battled Fabia and Avatar Marucho. She did not do much since Lena did most of the battle. She managed to take down the digital clone Aranaut and Avatar Marucho. After the battle, she suggested taking Fabia as a hostage, and upon approaching Fabia, she was thrown to the ground.

In episode 13, she disguised herself as Julie Makimoto to try to steal Drago. She told Dan to give Drago to her, but the real Julie showed up. Zenet then revealed her identity, removing her disguise and battles Dan and for first time on Earth outside of Bakugan Interspace, but lost.

In episode 14, Zenet, along with the members of the Minor Twelve Orders, was shown in her true form.

===== Jesse Glenn =====
Voiced by: Takashi Ōhara (Japanese); Jeremy Harris (English)

An agent from Gundalia. Talks and dresses like an actor or poet. He's a Ventus Brawler. Jesse first appears in episode 5 battling kids and then kidnapping them and bringing them back to Gundalia.

In episode 6, he brawls against Fabia Sheen. He was supposed to battle Dan Kuso but Fabia intervenes and brawls in Dan's place. Fabia was about to win until an error in the arena that Ren created (intended for Dan and Drago) affected Fabia and Aranaut, costing her the win. After Ren was revealed to be the enemy, Jesse left, but even after that, Ren still called Jesse a Neathian.

In episode 11, he battled alongside Ren, against Shun and Linus. He is strong showing that he defeated Linus and Shun all by himself.

He reappeared in episode 16 alongside Stoica to fight Dan and Fabia. However he and Stoica lose to Dan and Fabia.

==== Team Anubias ====
Team Anubias is a Bakugan team in Bakugan Interspace led by Anubias (who is under Mag Mel's orders). So far, only 4 members were seen and it seems like Team Anubias is composed of only male Brawlers. Their goal is to be Number One in Bakugan Interspace, which they have already done.

===== Ben =====
Voiced by: Tsuguo Mogami (Japanese), Drew Nelson (English)

Ben is a member of Team Anubias. He's a Pyrus Brawler.

===== Jack Punt =====
Voiced by: Gil Anderson

Jack is the youngest member of Team Anubias. He's an Aquos Brawler.

===== Robin =====
Voiced by: Shawn Meunier

Robin is the quiet member of Team Anubias. He usually borrows Krakenoid, Horridian, or Bolcanon.

===== Noah =====
Voiced by: Scott Gorman

Noah is Dan's former number 1 fan, joined Team Anubias after Anubias saves him from falling off the stand after Drago lost control of his powers.

==== Team Sellon ====
Team Sellon is a Bakugan team in Bakugan Interspace led by Sellon, in Bakugan: Mechtanium Surge. Their goal is to be on the top of the leader board, and later, to gain Drago's powers.

===== Chris =====
Voiced by: Emilie-Claire Barlow

Chris is a member of Team Sellon. She's a Subterra Brawler.

===== Soon =====
Voiced by: Alyson Court

Soon is the Haos brawler of Team Sellon.

== Other characters ==
=== Included in the anime series ===
==== Season 1 ====
===== Nene =====
Voiced by: Tomoko Kaneda (Japanese); Sunday Muse (25, 45), Caroly Larson (47) (English)

Nene is a Ventus battler that appeared in one episode alongside her brothers Akira and Shuji. She helps Julie and Billy defeat Tricloid with her Ravenoid. She basically taught both of her older brother how to play Vanguard despite her cute looks she's a fierce brawler.

===== Akira =====
Voiced by: Marina Inoue (Japanese); Susan Roman (English)

Akira is Shuji's younger brother and Nene's older brother. For most of the series, he is by Shuji's side but much later he brawls Dan and Runo alongside Shuji and Nene. He uses Subterra and his Guardian is a Centipoid.

===== Shuji =====
Voiced by: Tsuguo Mogami (Japanese); Darren Frost (English)

A brawler who uses Darkus and many different Bakugan types and kept on losing to Dan since episode 1. In the Gundalian Invaders's premiere, Shuji can be seen. His Guardian is Fear Ripper.

===== Ms. Purdy =====
Voiced by: Fuyuka Oura (Japanese); Joyce Gordon (English)

Dan's class teacher.

===== Rikimaru =====
Voiced by: Takayuki Kondō (Japanese); Dan Petronijevic (English)

A wanna-be brawler who sought power to become the strongest brawler. In episode 3, Masquerade promised to give him such power using the Doom card. In brawler battle, he lost to Dan and his creatures. He's also another cliché villain that acts mysteriously.

===== Ryo =====
Voiced by: Marina Inoue (Japanese); Tim Hamaguchi (4) and Jason Deline (English)

A brawler who preferred to plan for Bakugan strategies than actual battles, he fought against Dan in episode 4 after Dan had teased Ryo for his method. With Masquerade's help, Ryo was able to defeat Dan using Bakugan with lower G power, but lost to Dan in a rematch.

===== Tatsuya =====
Voiced by: Nobuhiko Okamoto (Japanese); Unknown (English)

Tatsuya appeared in episode 5 when Runo found Dan's Baku-Pod. On the Baku-Pod was a message from Masquerade to meet him at the river at 3:00, Runo decided to go fight Masquerade, but instead of Masquerade was Tatsuya and he lost to her. He uses Pyrus Bakugan and is a bully to the local kids but most of the time instead of brawling them he just harasses them and talks a lot more than he fights. Tatsuya's Guardian Bakugan is a Pyrus Fear Ripper. His Pyrus Mantris and Stinglash was sent to the Doom Dimension by Masquerade's Centipoid easily.

===== Kenta and Kenji =====
Kenta Voiced by: Fuyuka Oura (Japanese); Will Bowes (English)
Kenji Voiced by: Akiko Hokamura (Japanese); Darcy Smith (English)

They are twin brothers and magician team. They look exactly each other, except Kenta has red hair while Kenji has purple. They were recruited by Masquerade to tag brawl against Runo and Dan, who had never dueled as a team before. They lose after Dan and Runo figure out a strategy but they were winning early in the game since Runo and Dan were fighting and both had separate strategies but after Kenta lost a round he became more impulsive and didn't listen to Kenji's advice. It was also shown that Kenta taught Kenji how to play Bakugan. They use Pyrus and Darkus and their Guardians are Robotallion and Mantris.

===== JJ Dolls =====
Jenny Voiced by: Miyuki Sawashiro (Japanese); Megan Fahlenbock (English)
Jewels Voiced by: Marina Inoue (Japanese); Bailey Stocker (English) and Stevie Vallance (52)

Jenny and Jewels both enjoy playing Bakugan, but their manager wants them to focus on their career. Jenny's Guardian Bakugan is Aquas Siege and Jewels Guardian Bakugan is Subterra Centipoid. They both brawl against Dan and Marucho under Masquerade's orders and later against Taygen alongside Marucho. In Bakugan: New Vestroia they can be seen on a large TV screen in the background during episodes 1 and 37.

===== Miu and Makoto =====
Miu Voiced by: Sayuri Yahagi (Japanese); Cara Leslie (English)
Makoto Voiced by: Kokoro Kikuchi (Japanese); Katie Griffin (English)

Shown in Episode 9. They are shown to love Bakugan, so Takashi and Kosuke taught him how to brawl. Their parents separated and now they live in different parts of the world but they were reunited after Runo and Marucho beat Kosuke and Takashi. Makoto met with Dan at an airport after hearing Drago talk before he left to reunite with Miu. Miu is shown to miss him to the point of crying and called for quitting the match.

===== Takashi and Kosuke =====
Takashi Voiced by: Takayuki Kondō (Japanese); Mitchell Eisner (English)
Kosuke Voiced by: Nobuhiko Okamoto (Japanese); Lyon Smith (English)

They are brothers and friends to Miu and Makoto and taught him how to play. When they see Miu upset that she hasn't seen her brother yet, Masquerade tells them if they can defeat the Battle Brawlers, he will reunite Miu with her brother. They brawl Runo and Marucho but relinquishes the Doom Card when Miu starts crying. They then play them again and lose, though they were glad they had fun. Miu then gives them both a kiss on the cheek for trying to help her. He brawls using Pyrus and Darkus Bakugan.

===== Christopher =====
Voiced by: Ayumi Fujimura (Japanese); Connor Price (24, 33, 37), Jake Roseman (48) (English)

A seven-year-old child that never won at Bakugan until Alice trained him. In episode 24, Christopher was seen by Alice when she was shopping by the lake about to throw his Bakugan into it. Alice tries to stop him, but accidentally pushes him into it. Alice tries to help him beat his rival Travis. After Alice taught him how to be a better battler, Christopher beat Travis in a battle. He may have a crush on Alice. Christopher also tries to help Alice fight Rabeeder, alongside Klaus, whom he idolizes. He gained many helpful tips from Klaus and he was able to help Klaus win since Alice's Alpha Hydranoid was being encased in crystal at the time. He helps fight a Haos/Subterra hybrid with Alice in episode 47. His guardian is a Juggernoid.

===== Travis =====
Voiced by: Unknown (Japanese); Carter Hayden (English)

A Darkus Brawler and a bully who picks on Christopher daily and forces him to battle just to make him lose at Bakugan so that Travis can look good. Until Christopher is helped by Alice, Travis always won. He then stopped picking on Christopher after he lost. His main Bakugan is a Mantris.

==== Season 2 ====
===== Vestal Security =====
They are guards that the former King Zenoheld and Professor Clay had at the Vexos Motherpalace. They are first seen in episode 27. In episode 40, they chased Dan Kuso and Mira Clay while they sneaked into the Motherpalace. Other guards appear different in the Vestal cities. One of them has the same voice actor as the intercom that says "Field, Open!" in Interspace. Many personal was protecting the three cities.

===== Dark Angels =====
Annie Voiced by: Unknown (Japanese); Novie Edwards (English)
Vanessa Voiced by: Unknown (Japanese); Stacey DePass (English)

They are a tag team that battled Shun and Ace in the semifinal rounds of the Alpha city tournament. Both members use Haos. It is implied they are friends, or maybe even twin sisters. Their Guardians are Anchorsaur and Hammersaur.

===== Brandon =====
Voiced by: Asami Sanada (Japanese)

A minor Battle Brawler in the first season but appeared in the second one, in the theme park where the Resistance went to. He is an Aquos Brawler and fought against Naga's Bakugan. His guardian is a Juggernoid.

===== Agonizer =====
A torture machine appeared in episode 49, when Zenoheld got angry on Prince Hydron for not retrieving the Phantom Data and the other Brawlers on his side failing him. Zenoheld used the Agonizer to torture Hydron, thus punishing him for his actions.

==== Season 3 ====
===== Koji Beetle =====
Voiced by: Kenji Akabane (Japanese); Alex House (English)

He first appeared in episode 3 unnamed. After meeting Fabia and asked by her if he got her message, he lied saying he did to get her attention. She then challenged him to a brawl, to know if he really did get it. Because Koji undermestiated her he lost. He reappears in episode 22, trying to get into Bakugan Interspace. Julie stops him, however, and tells him about the Gundalian-Neathian war. He leaves, thinking her story is too farfetched and is approached by Stoica who convinces him to go to Gundalia where he is quickly brainwashed by Kazarina. He battle Fabia and Dan with the Mobile Assault Vehicle and nearly wins, but loses when Drago uses his own Mobile Assault Vehicle. He is returned to Earth and wakes up in Bakugan Interspace, having no memory of what transpired. He tells Julie about what happened and vaguely remembers Dan's voice telling him about not give up on him.

===== Casey and Taylor =====
Casey Voiced by: Shunzō Miyasaka (Japanese); Jeremy Mortimer (English)
Taylor Voiced by: Hitomi Harada (Japanese); Stacey DePass (English)

Two brawlers who were kidnapped by the Gundalians. They're a Ventus-and-Darkus Team. Their Bakugan were Buz Hornix and Venoclaw.

===== Siem and Luin Pam =====
Siem Pam Voiced by: Akeno Watanabe (Japanese); Tyrone Savage (English)
Luin Pam Voiced by: Hiromi Igarashi (Japanese); Graeme Cornies (English)

Two brawlers & twin brothers who were brainwashed by the Gundalians. Like Casey & Taylor, they're a Ventus/Darkus Team. Their Bakugan were Volt Elezoid, Longfly, Ramdol, & Ziperator.

===== Baroduis' Father =====
The former Emperor of Gundalia. Barodius disliked him for fearing the powers of the Sacred Orb and also called him a "superstitious old fool" for this. From what is indicated during Nurzak and Barodius' conversation, Barodius' Father was a kind and caring ruler, sovereign/monarch to his people and not a power crazy tyrant like Barodius.

===== Jin =====
Voiced by: Unknown (Japanese); Brian Froud (English)

Fabia's deceased fiancé and Aranaut's original partner. He was killed by Kazarina in a battle and she took Aranaut back to Gundalia. Meanwhile, Fabia snuck on to Gundalia and rescued him, and the two became partners. However, Aranaut lost his memory of the incident due to Kazarina's experiments and believes he has always been Fabia's partner. But in episode 35, Aranaut revealed he never forgot about Jin and he was lying the whole time to not hurt Fabia.

===== Robin =====
Voiced by: Unknown (Japanese); Mitchell Eisner (English)

A young boy who was kidnapped by the Gundalians. He is used by Kazarina to bring Jake into a trap in episode 27. After that, he and other kids who were kidnapped by Gundalians return to the Earth. Like others, they lose their memories. He is said to have a sister.

===== Floria =====
Nurzak's deceased daughter. Apparently, Nurzak had preferred battling in the front over making strategies in the back. Because of his attitude, when he led a group of soldiers, which included Floria, on an attack, they were killed in battle. It is likely that because of Floria's death, Nurzak favored strategizing before making an attack. While telling Fabia this story, he mentions that she reminds him of Floria. After saving Fabia from being carried away by the water, he has a vision of Floria while being carried away himself. He apologizes for not being able to protect her, but he is glad that he managed to save Fabia.

===== Code Eve =====
Voiced by: Akiko Sekine (Japanese); Deann Degruijter (English)

The Mother Light of all Bakugan, who was inside the Sacred Orb. She created the first two bakugan the Genesis Dragonoid who created Vestroia and was the ancestor to the bakugan who resides there and was Drago direct ancestor and the Daraknoid who was the ancestor to the Bakugan of Neathia and Gundalia and was the direct ancestor to Darak.

==== Season 4 ====
===== Dylan =====
Voiced by: Andrew Jackson

Dylan appears to be some sort of dealer inside Bakugan Interspace. He is seen licking a blue and yellow striped lollipop. Both the Brawlers and Team Anubias find him quite annoying. In episode 20 "True Colours", it was revealed that he was actually a collection of data in human form created by Bakugan Interspace to cater to the desire of brawlers for more intense battles. In episode 23 he helps for Marucho to send a message for his dad.

===== Sion and Lucas, the Tri-Twisters =====
Sion: Voiced by: Graeme Cornies
Lucas: Voiced by: Lyon Smith

Their first appearance is in episode 5, where Mag Mel decides to give these two boys Chaos Bakugan (Cyclone Percivals) and are brainwashed into doing his bidding after they are defeated by Anubias. They soon challenge the Brawlers, but instead of the entire members of the Brawlers showing up, Shun and Marucho decide to take them on without Dan's help. The Tri-Twisters use some underhanded tactics making it seem like the Brawlers didn't have a chance. It is soon shown that the Tri-Twisters had thrown down a third Cyclone Percival into the battlefield, as it was attacking Taylean invisibly. Soon afterwards, they are easily defeated by Sellon and Anubias (after interrupting the battle).

===== Bash Brothers =====
Their first appearance is in episode 7, where they challenged Anubias but were both defeated easily by Horridian and his BakuNano Aeroblaze. Mag Mel is watching them and decides to make them a part of his army and gives them 2 Flash Ingrams. Later, Shun and Marucho watch them destroy an unknown team with their new BakuNano mercilessly. Later, they both battle Marucho and Trister and they were defeating them. However, Shun intervenes and they battle him. At first, they are winning due to their BakuNano but are defeated ultimately by Shun.

===== Cameraman =====
He is the cameraman who follows Julie around to report the news.

== Included in other media ==
=== Video games ===
==== The Player ====
Although non-Canon, the Player defeats all the Brawlers and reaches Number 1 and Dan makes him an official member of the Battle Brawlers. The player is the hero of the first video game and returned in the third (although he's not really the same person in this game), Defenders of the Core.

==== Marduk ====
Voiced by: Dan Petronijevic

A Darkus Brawler and the villain in the first videogame. Wishing to rule all Bakugan with his Guardian Bakugan, Vladitor, who eventually evolved into Battle Ax Vladitor, Marduk was greatly saddened when his partner faded out of existence after losing the final battle to the player.

==== Regulars ====
The villains in the second videogame, Battle Trainer. They drive a space ship called the Dark Star and stole all Bakugan from Earth, and also deleted Dan's memory. This alien group is led by Vector (Professor Trecov); and his pals Rurock, Viper and Mantis. They wanted to create the most powerful Bakugan with the silent core, but after their defeat, they escaped but not before claiming vengeance on Dan. After the game's ending, it is revealed that the Regulars were working for Naga.

==== Abyss ====
Abyss is a character in Bakugan: Defenders of the Core. She is considered the goddess-guardian of her "Earth"s core, and the one responsible to alter the Bakugan Interspace to take the Player to her reality. Spectra is after her for the whole game to power-up Maxus Helios. The only one who can see her is the player of the game. She is the alternate "Earth's" Core. She seems to get power from landmarks and holograms. Also, she grows weaker as landmarks are destroyed and vexos crystals are made. She is eventually killed during the battle at the Earth's core. Ironically, the player was forced to destroy her because Maxus Helios was becoming too powerful because she was basically a power source. Throughout the story, she evolves your bakugan.

=== Manga ===
==== Katie Lowery ====
She appeared in the manga The Evo Tournament. It is unknown what her main Attribute is. Her Guardian Bakugan is Chamelia, but it was sent to the Doom Dimension. Her new Guardian became Mecha Chamelia, a mechanical Bakugan built by her father. She develops a relationship with Marucho over the internet at which point Shun reveals he knew her before meeting the others. He had helped her practice for a match and offered to lend some of his abilities if he beat her in a battle. She lost and never spoke to him again and later stole his ability cards.

==== Harubaru Hinode ====
Harubaru Hinode (日ノ出 春晴, Hinode Harubaru) is the main character of the Manga BakuTech! Bakugan. His partner is Flare Dragaon.

==== Raichi ====
- Destroy Munikis

The rival of Flare Dragaon and Raichi's Guardian Bakugan. By using the destruction type ability, it has the power to eliminate the whole world and turns it to nothing, thus its nickname 'God of Destruction'.

==== Griff Koh ====
- Kilan Leoness:

==== Griff Shaw ====
- Van Falco:
