= Ulrich Seibert =

German jurisprudent

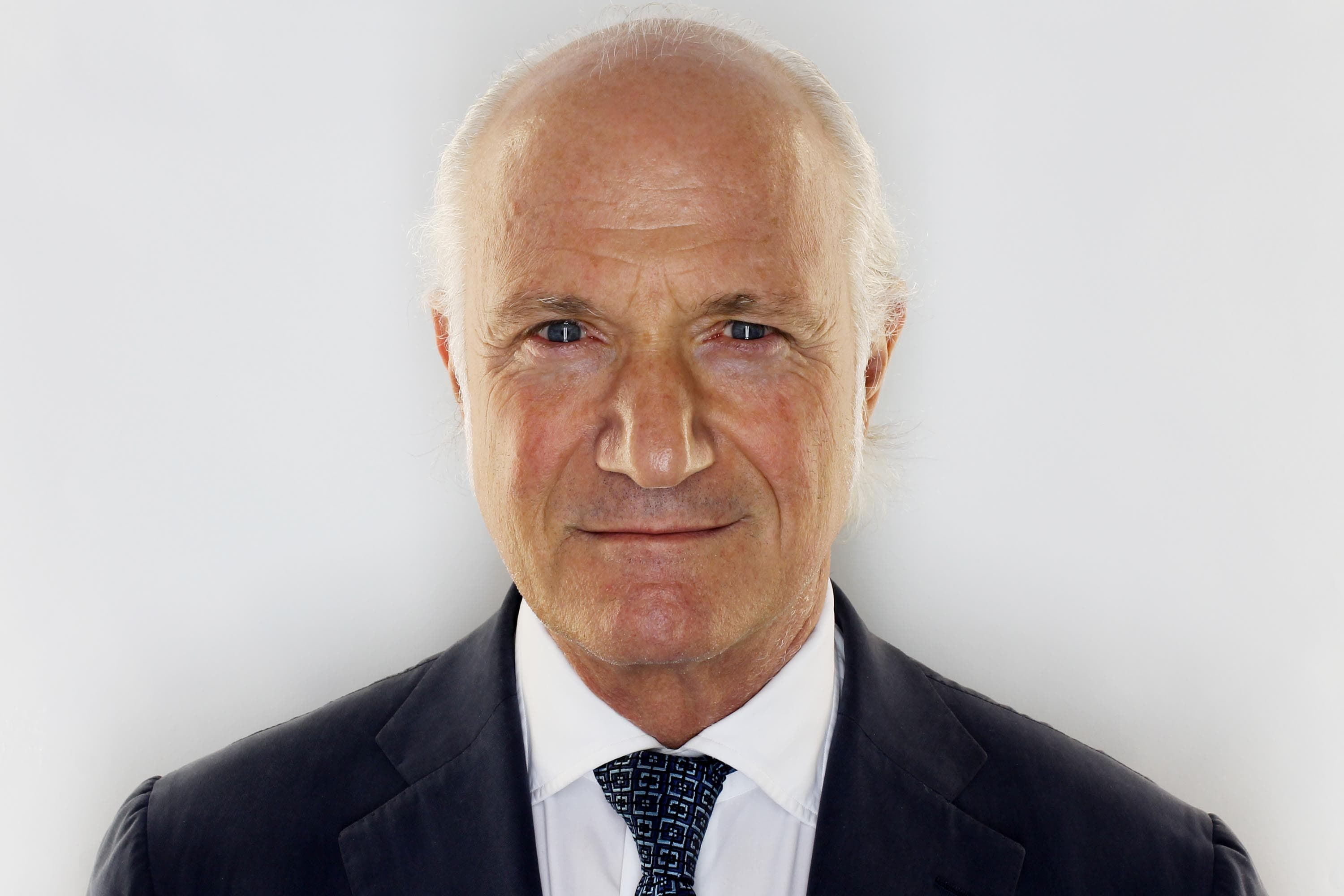
Ulrich Seibert © Jurgen Ostarhild

Ulrich Seibert (born August 8, 1954, in Karlsruhe) is a German jurisprudent, he was head of the division for German company law and corporate governance at the Federal Ministry of Justice and Consumer Protection in Berlin until 8. 2020, and was an honorary professor for economic law at the faculty of law of the Heinrich-Heine University of Düsseldorf.

== Career ==
Ulrich Seibert is the son of Edith Seibert, an informal painter, and Claus Seibert, a judge at the Federal Court of Justice of Germany in Karlsruhe; his grandmother was the german writer Liesbet Dill. He studied law in Tübingen, Göttingen and Freiburg. He completed his first state examination in law in 1979. In 1982, he graduated at the University of Hamburg and received the title J. D. After study periods in Florence (Professor Luigi Lombardi Vallauri, filosofia del diritto presso l’Universita degli Studi di Firenze) and Paris, and completing the second state examination in law, Seibert became a judge at the labour court and then at the local court in Hamburg. In 1986, he moved to the Federal Ministry of Justice in Bonn, where he became head of the division for cabinet and parliamentary affairs under Minister Klaus Kinkel in 1990. He has been head of the division for company law and corporate governance since 1992 and was appointed Ministerialrat in 1997.

In 2001, Seibert was awarded the title "honorary professor" by the law faculty of the Heinrich-Heine University of Düsseldorf. He is one of the directors of the Center for Business and Corporate Law (Institut für Unternehmensrecht) in Düsseldorf and was a member of the Hamburg Circle for Family Business Law at Bucerius Law School. He is member of the Board of the Sapienzia Foundation Potsdam (as part of the Leo Baeck Foundation Brandenburg), was a member of the Bureau of the Corporate Governance committee of the OECD, Paris, and member of the Board of Trustees of the German Association for the Protection of Securities Ownership (Deutsche Schutzvereinigung für Wertpapierbesitz e.V. (DSW)). Since 2021 he is Member of the advisory board of the Corporate Governance Institute at the Frankfurt School of Finance and Management, and a member of the supervisory board of the Cooperative for Urban Creativity (Genossenschaft für urbane Kreativität eG) in Berlin (GuK, Holzmarkt Berlin, Kater Blau).

Since the early nineties, Ulrich Seibert has drafted most laws within the field of company law and corporate governance and has represented Germany also at EU, OECD and G20 level. He was responsible for drafting the 1994 law on "kleine Aktiengesellschaften" (closed limited companies on shares), the law concerning the Corporate Sector Supervision and Transparency Act (Gesetz zur Kontrolle und Transparenz im Unternehmensbereich – KonTraG, 1998), which was the first important corporate governance reform in Germany, the law on no-par value shares (Stückaktiengesetz – StückAG, 1998), the law on registered shares and the facilitating of the exercise of voting rights (Gesetz zur Namensaktie und zur Erleichterung der Stimmrechtsausübung – NaStraG, 2001), and the Act on Corporate Integrity and Modernization of the Law to Challenge Decisions by the Shareholders' Meeting (Gesetz zur Unternehmensintegrität und Modernisierung des Anfechtungsrechts – UMAG, 2004).

During the 16th legislative period in Germany (October 2005-October 2009), Seibert prepared numerous legislative proposals, such as the Act on Electronic Commercial Registers (Gesetz über das Elektronische Handels- und Genossenschaftsregister sowie das Unternehmensregister – EHUG) and the Act to Modernize the Law Governing Private Limited Companies and to Combat Abuses (Gesetz zur Modernisierung des GmbH-Rechts und zur Bekämpfung von Missbräuchen – MoMiG, 2008) – which constituted the first major GmbH reform since the creation of this law in the late 19th century. He also drafted the politically controversial amendment of the Volkswagen Law, the Act Implementing the Shareholder Rights Directive (Gesetz zur Umsetzung der Aktionärsrechterichtlinie – ARUG), and the Act on Appropriate Executive Board Remuneration (Gesetz zur Angemessenheit der Vorstandsvergütung – VorstAG). During the 2008 financial crisis, he was charged with the corporation law aspects of the stabilization measures, including the Financial Market Stabilization Act (Finanzmarktstabilisierungsgesetz – FMStG, 2008). The 17th legislative period (October 2009-October 2013) brought, among other things, the statutory regulation of the partnership company with limited professional liability (PartGmbB).

In the course of the 18th legislative period (October 2013–October 2017), Seibert drew up the politically acclaimed draft on the introduction of a female quota in supervisory boards in the private sector (Law for Equal Participation of Women and Men in Leadership Positions in the Private Sector and Public Service, also known as FüPoG law in force since 1 May 2015). He also worked on the 2014 reform of stock company law, the proposal for an EU directive to amend the Shareholder Rights Directive, (implemented into German Law as "ARUG II" in the 19th legislative period). At COVID-19 times in 2020, he created the regulation for the virtual general meeting, which gave German companies the option of holding their general meetings purely online. Seibert left the Ministry at the end of August 2020.

Seibert was the Ministry's 'liaison manager' to the government commission "Deutscher Corporate Governance Kodex" (German CG Code) from its beginning. He also coined the term "legal designer", which refers to a ministry official who designs draft laws.

Ulrich Seibert is the author and publisher of several books and has written more than 200 essays in the field of commercial law and corporate governance. He is an art collector (Pop-Surrealism, Low Brow - permanent showroom in Berlin: www.seibert-collection.art) and is a significant investor. He is married and has four children.

== Publications ==
- "Berliner Schlaglichter Band I (Notes from the back of my taxi) and Band II (Notes on my iPad)" March Verlag 2023. ISBN 978-3-7550-0024-2
- "LowBrow in Berlin – The Seibert Collection" March Verlag 2023. ISBN 978-3-7550-5022-3
- Gesetz zur Modernisierung des GmbH-Rechts und zur Bekämpfung von Missbräuchen - MoMiG RWS-Verlag, Köln 2008. ISBN 978-3-8145-1882-4
- Aus dem Entwurfsatelier der Gesetzgebung - Beobachtungen zur Denk- und Arbeitsweise des Gesetzgebungsreferenten im Bundesministerium der Justiz in Festschrift für Wiedemann, 2002, Seite 123ff.
- Deutschland im Herbst - Erinnerungen an die Entstehung des Finanzmarkstabilisierungsgesetzes im Oktober 2008 in Festschrift für Klaus Hopt 2010, Bd. 2, Seite 2525ff.
- Ethik in der Wirtschaft und die Rolle der Politik in Festschrift für Karsten Schmidt, 2009, Seite 1455ff.
- Handbuch der kleinen AG. 5. Auflage. RWS-Verlag, Köln 2008. ISBN 978-3-8145-8118-7.
- Das Transparenz- und Publizitätsgesetz (TransPuG). München 2003, ISBN 3406498310.
- Die Partnerschaft: eine neue Gesellschaftsform für die Freien Berufe. Bundesanzeiger Verlag, Bonn 1994. ISBN 3-88784-571-4.
- Control and Transparency in Business (KonTraG): Corporate Governance Reform in Germany, European Business Law Review, 1999, 70pp.
- Corporate Governance and the Role of Investment Funds, German Law Journal, GLJ vol. 3, No 11
- The Company Law Reform Projects of the German Ministry of Justice, Rabels Zeitschrift, vol. 69 (2005), 712pp.
