= Ao Takahashi =

Japanese voice actress

- 高梁 碧
- Born: Hiroko Takahashi; August 8, 1979 (age 46); Saitama Prefecture, Japan
- Occupation: Voice actress
- Years active: 1999–present
- Agent: Stay Luck
- Height: 158 cm (5 ft 2 in)
- Spouse: Shinnosuke Tachibana (m. 2017)
- Children: 1

Ao Takahashi (高梁 碧, Takahashi Ao; born August 8, 1979), formally known as Hiroko Takahashi (高橋 裕子, Takahashi Hiroko) is a Japanese voice actress affiliated with Kenyu Office and formerly affiliated with Aoni Production and Aksent.

== Biography ==
Her blood type is A. On January 5, 2017, she married Shinnosuke Tachibana.

== Filmography ==
=== Anime ===
2004

- Diamond Daydreams as Karin Shiraishi

2007

- Bakugan Battle Brawlers as Shiori Kazami; Joe's Mother
- Bokurano as Chizuru Honda
- Minami-ke as Riko

2008

- Minami-ke: Okawari as Riko, Reporter
- Nodame Cantabile: Paris-Hen as Catherine
- A Certain Magical Index as Researcher

2009

- Asura Cryin' 2 as Hiwako Torishima
- Black Butler as Matilda Simmons
- Minami-ke: Okaeri as Riko

2010

- House of Five Leaves as Okinu
- Jewelpet Twinkle☆ as Jewelina
- Sekirei: Pure Engagement as Taki
- The Betrayal Knows My Name as Doll D; Female Duras; Young Shusei

2011

- Blue Exorcist as Noriko Paku
- Level E as Saki

2012

- Gon as Mū
- Jormungand as Margaret "Maggie" Messner
- Jormungand: Perfect Order as Margaret "Maggie" Messner
- Natsume Yūjin-chō Shi as Yōko

2013

- Kingdom as Liao
- Minami-ke: Tadaima as Riko

2014

- Date a Live II as Ryōko Kusakabe
- Daimidaler: Prince vs Penguin Empire as Chieko Kakazu

2019

- Vinland Saga as Helga

=== Dubbing ===
- East of Eden, Gook Young-ran/Grace (Lee Yeon-hee)
- Fired Up!, Bianca (Danneel Harris)
- Get Smart's Bruce and Lloyd: Out of Control, Nina (Jayma Mays)
- Gossip Girl, Amanda Lasher (Laura-Leigh)
- The Prince, Angela (Jessica Lowndes)
