= Natalia Fabia =

American painter (born 1983)

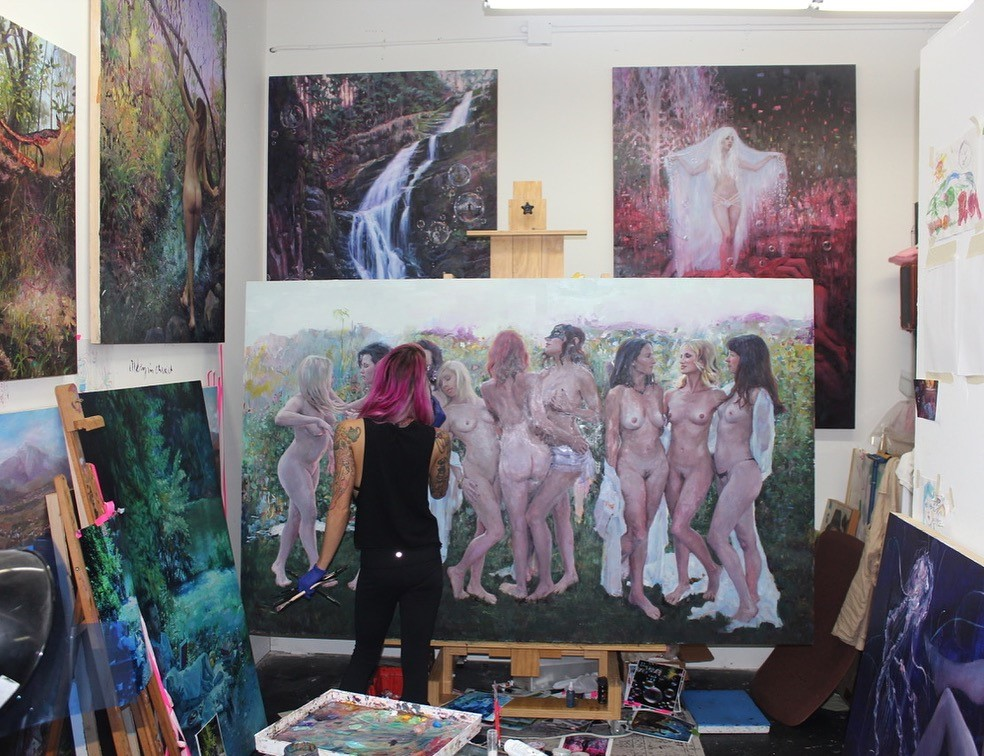
- Fabia seen in 2015 working on her painting "Fruitful Goddess", which was part of her 2016 exhibition Rainbeau Samsara
- Born: Los Angeles, California, U.S.
- Other name: Natalia Fabia–Bentley
- Education: ArtCenter College of Design
- Spouse: Jay Bentley
- Children: 2

Natalia Fabia is an American painter, based in Orange County, California.

== Early life, family and education ==
Natalia Fabia's parents immigrated from the Polish People's Republic.

Fabia is married to Jay Bentley, and they have two children. The family lives in Orange County, California.

== Career ==
Fabia is a graduate from ArtCenter College of Design's Illustration program. Fabia's career began in the early 2000s by showing in various group exhibitions around Los Angeles. She quickly established herself in the field of figurative painting, and her early works drew comparison to Toulouse-Lautrec in both style and content. Fabia is known for predominantly using oil and employing alla prima painting techniques.

Her early works are "filled with people, lush environments, ornate fashion, light interiors, glamour, graffiti, landscapes, punk rock music and an unapologetic sexiness." Whilst her later works, predominantly from her show Rainbeau Samsara, focused on "life cycles and the stages and emotions within those time frames, from birth to transition."

In 2010, she was named one of "LA's 100" most fascinating people in LA Weekly's 2010 People Issue.

Her work is held in the collections of several prominent individuals, including Lena Dunham, Mark Parker, Long Gone John, and Ulrich Seibert (Seibert Collection).

She created the concert poster for the band Tool's 2022 performance in Utah, the album art for Fat Mike's You're Welcome, and NOFX's album Cokie the Clown. In 2025, she was named one of "Ten Essential Local Artists Inspired by the City of Angels" by Los Angeles Magazine.

Her art has been featured in Vogue Italia, Elle Magazine, LA Weekly, VICE, The Los Angeles Times. Her art has been described as "a testament to the modern woman."

She appeared in the documentary film, Struggle: The Life and Lost Art of Szukalski (2018) as herself. She has also appeared on the American reality television series Miami Ink, and season 16 of The Bachelorette.

== Exhibitions ==
=== Solo exhibitions ===
- 2006: Hooker Manor, Thinkspace Gallery, Los Angeles, California
- 2007: Hooker Safari, Corey Helford Gallery, Los Angeles, California
- 2008: Miss Hooker Beauty Pageant, Dragonfly, Los Angeles, California
- 2009: Hooker Dreamscapes, Corey Helford Gallery, Los Angeles, California
- 2012: Fashionable Aftertaste Without End, Corey Helford Gallery, Los Angeles, California
- 2012: Miss Hooker Beauty Pageant, Dragonfly, Los Angeles, California
- 2012: Punk Rock Rainbow Sparkle, Jonathan LeVine Gallery, New York City, New York
- 2016: Rainbeau Samsara, Corey Helford Gallery, Los Angeles, California

=== Group exhibitions ===
- 2009: True Self, Curated by Gary Baseman, Jonathan LeVine Gallery, New York City, New York
- 2010: ¡Sugipop!, Portsmouth Museum of Art, Portsmouth, New Hampshire
- 2010: Art from the New World, Bristol Museum & Art Gallery, Bristol, UK
- 2010: Sanrio, Small Gift, Barker Hangar, Santa Monica, California
- 2011: The Emergence of the Pop Imagest, Venice, Italy; curated by Jonathan LeVine and Giovanni Bonelli
- 2012: Hello Kitty, Hello Art!, Openhouse Gallery, New York City, New York
- 2013: Risqué {Dirty Little Pictures}, Long Beach Museum of Art, Long Beach, California
- 2015: Invisible College, Fort Wayne Museum of Art, Fort Wayne, Indiana
- 2015: Robert Williams' "Slang" & 20 Years Under the Influence of Juxtapose, Los Angeles, California
- 2016: LA Art Show, Red Truck Gallery, Los Angeles, California
- 2016: Scope Miami International Art Fair, Miami, Florida
- 2016: Instalarity, Curated by F. Scott Hess, Q Art Salon, Santa Ana, California
- 2017: Woman as Warrior, Zhou B Art Center, Chicago, Illinois
- 2018: California Art Cub 107th Annual Gold Medal Exhibition, Natural History Museum of Los Angeles, California
- 2018: Painting the Figure NOW, Wausau Museum of Contemporary Art, Wausau, Wisconsin
- 2018: Art Palm Beach, Sirona Gallery, Palm Beach, Florida
- 2020: Distilled Beauty: Select Artists from the 14th International Art Renewal Center Salon, American Legacy Fine Arts, Pasadena, California
- 2020: Unjust Contenment, BeinArt Gallery, Melbourne, Australia
- 2022: The Last Unicorn 40th Anniversary Group Show, Corey Helford Gallery, Los Angeles, California
- 2025: Toys as Art, Art Inspired by Toys: Mattel's 80th Anniversary Group Exhibition, in collaboration between Mattel Creations and Corey Helford Gallery, Los Angeles, California
