= MoMiG =

German corporate law reform bill

MoMiG is the acronym for the "Modernisierung des GmbH-Rechts und zur Bekämpfung von Missbräuchen" or "Law for the Modernisation of the German Limited Liability Company Law and the Prevention of Misuse". MoMiG came into effect in Germany on 1 November 2008.

The general purpose of MoMiG is to accelerate establishment of business, modernise the German limited liability (GmbH) law to make the GmbH structure more competitive internationally, and minimise abuse of company law.

== Main innovations of MoMiG ==
1. Facilitating raising of capital and the transfer of shares in the business – e.g. introduction of new corporate form called the Entrepreneur's GmbH, which may be incorporated without share capital;

2. Introducing a ‘model’ articles of association – simplified templates that combine the articles, the appointment of directors and the shareholders’ list into one document;
3. Accelerating registration of companies;
4. Transferring administration headquarters abroad – increase the ability of German companies to do business outside of Germany and provide an attractive option for them to manage their foreign subsidiaries within the GmbH form;
5. Increasing importance of shareholder list – only those persons who are on the shareholder list filed will be considered shareholders of a GmbH and be entitled to voting and dividend rights;
6. Acquiring shares in good faith – the shareholder list filed with the register will also become the basis for a bona fide acquisition of shares;
7. Facilitating cash pooling – a return to the balance sheet view;
8. Deregulating the law on shareholder loans – all shareholder loans can be repaid during a financial crisis but prior to insolvency, and during insolvency will be subordinated to other creditors’ claims;
9. Suppressing abuse – provisions against abuse of company law.
