= Fabia Arete =

Fabia Arete was a dancer, actress and singer in Ancient Rome.

She was a freedwoman (specifically 'of Marcus'), which was a common background for a stage performer. She is referred to as an archimima, which was the title for the leading lady actress of a Roman theatre, and as a diurna, signifying that she toured as a guest actress in different theatres and theatre companies, demonstrating that she enjoyed fame and popularity.

She is described as a famed actress and likely belonged to the elite minority of Roman actresses employed to perform speaking roles in a period when female stage artists were normally engaged only to dance or sing in the choir, and she became wealthy enough to afford a grand funeral monument for herself and her spouse. A role she is believed to have performed was the famous comedy role of the plotting wife Charition.
