= Bushell v Faith =

1970 law case in the United Kingdom

- Court: House of Lords
- Citation: [1970] AC 1099

Case history
- Prior action: [1969] 2 Ch. 438

Court membership
- Judges sitting: Lord Donovan, Lord Reid, Lord Upjohn, Lord Guest and Lord Morris of Borth-y-Gest (dissenting)

Keywords
- Voting, director removal, closely held companies

Bushell v Faith [1970] AC 1099 is a UK company law case, concerning the possibility of weighting votes, and the relationship to section 184 of Companies Act 1948 (the predecessor of s 168 of the Companies Act 2006) which mandates that directors may be removed from a board by ordinary resolution (a simple majority of shareholder votes).

The decision is not relevant to companies listed on the London Stock Exchange as the listing rules refuse listing where the articles of association contain restrictions on removing the board of directors.

== Facts ==
A property company called Bush Court (Southgate) Ltd owned a block of flats. There was £300 capital, 100 shares held by Mr Faith and the other 200 by his two sisters, Mrs Bushell and Dr Bayne. Article 9 of the company constitution said that under a resolution to remove a director, that director's shares would carry three votes each. When the two sisters tried to remove him, Mr Faith recorded 300 votes and the other two, 200 votes together.

Ungoed-Thomas J said that the article infringed s 184. The Court of Appeal (Harman LJ, Russell LJ and Karminski LJ) reversed this decision. The sisters appealed to the House of Lords.

== Judgment ==
The House of Lords held that the provision was valid, because there was no express indication by Parliament that it intended otherwise.

Lord Reid, giving the first judgment said that

with a some reluctance I agree with the majority of your Lordships that this appeal must be dismissed. Article 9 of the articles of association of this company is obviously designed to evade section 184 (1) of the Companies Act, 1949 [sic], which provides that a company may by ordinary resolution remove a director notwithstanding anything in its articles. The extra voting power given by that article to a director, whose removal from office is proposed, makes it impossible in the circumstances of this case for any resolution for the removal of any director to be passed if that director votes against it.

But he said that given the recognition of giving weighted votes was recognised in Table A, the former Model Articles in the Schedule attached to the Companies Act 1948, "we must take the law as we find it". He emphasised the possibility of reform in later enactments.

Lord Morris of Borth-y-Gest dissented in a short opinion. He said:

Some shares may, however, carry a greater voting power than others. On a resolution to remove a director shares will therefore carry the voting power that they possess. But this does not, in my view, warrant a device such as article 9 introduces. Its unconcealed effect is to make a director irremovable. If the question is posed whether the shares of the respondent possess any added voting weight the answer must be that they possess none whatsoever beyond, if valid, an ad hoc weight for the special purpose of circumventing section 184. If article 9 were writ large it would set out that a director is not to be removed against his will and that in order to achieve this and to thwart the express provision of section 184 the voting power of any director threatened with removal is to be deemed to be greater than it actually is. The learned judge thought that to sanction this would be to make a mockery of the law. I think so also.

Lord Upjohn approved the provision. He emphasised the Court of Appeal's approval of the provision.

Harman LJ [approved article 9 of the company constitution] on the simple ground that the Act of 1948 did not prevent certain shares or classes of shares having special voting rights attached to them and on certain occasions. He could find nothing in the Act of 1948 which prohibited the giving of special voting rights to the shares of a director who finds his position attacked. Russell L.J. in his judgment gave substantially the same reasons for allowing the appeal and he supported his judgment by reference to a number of recent precedents particularly those to be found in Palmer's Company Precedents, 17th ed. (1956), but, with all respect to the learned Lord Justice, I do not think these precedents which, so far as relevant, are comparatively new can be said to have the settled assent and approbation of the profession, so as to render them any real guide for the purposes of a judgment; especially when I note the much more cautious approach by the learned editors of the Encyclopaedia of Forms and Precedents, 4th ed. (1966), Vol. 5, p. 428, where in reference to a form somewhat similar to special article 9 they say in a footnote:

"The validity of such a provision as this in relation to a resolution to remove a director from office remains to be tested in the courts."

My Lords, when construing an Act of Parliament it is a canon of construction that its provisions must be construed in the light of the mischief which the Act was designed to meet. In this case the mischief was well known; it was a common practice, especially in the case of private companies, to provide in the articles that a director should be irremovable or only removable by an extraordinary resolution; in the former case the articles would have to be altered by special resolution before the director could be removed and of course in either case a three-quarters majority would be required. In many cases this would be impossible, so the Act provided that notwithstanding anything in the articles an ordinary resolution would suffice to remove a director. That was the mischief which the section set out to remedy; to make a director removable by virtue of an ordinary resolution instead of an extraordinary resolution or making it necessary to alter the articles.

An ordinary resolution is not defined nor used in the body of the Act of 1948 though the phrase occurs in some of the articles of Table A in the First Schedule to the Act. But its meaning is, in my opinion, clear. An ordinary resolution is in the first place passed by a bare majority on a show of hands by the members entitled to vote who are present personally or by proxy and on such a vote each member has one vote regardless of his share holding. If a poll is demanded then for an ordinary resolution still only a bare majority of votes is required. But whether a share or class of shares has any vote upon the matter and, if so, what is its voting power upon the resolution in question depends entirely upon the voting rights attached to that share or class of shares by the articles of association...

Parliament has never sought to fetter the right of the company to issue a share with such rights or restrictions as it may think fit. There is no fetter which compels the company to make the voting rights or restrictions of general application and it seems to me clear that such rights or restrictions can be attached to special circumstances and to particular types of resolution. This makes no mockery of section 184; all that Parliament was seeking to do thereby was to make an ordinary resolution sufficient to remove a director. Had Parliament desired to go further and enact that every share entitled to vote should be deprived of its special rights under the articles it should have said so in plain terms by making the vote on a poll one vote one share. Then, what about shares which had no voting rights under the articles? Should not Parliament give them a vote when considering this completely artificial form of ordinary resolution? Suppose there had here been some preference shares in the name of Mr. Faith's wife, which under the articles had in the circumstances no vote; why in justice should her voice be excluded from consideration in this artificial vote?

I only raise this purely hypothetical case to show the great difficulty of trying to do justice by legislation in a matter which has always been left to the corporators themselves to decide.

Lord Donovan said:

My Lords, the issue here is the true construction of section 184 of the Companies Act, 1948: and I approach it with no conception of what the legislature wanted to achieve by the section other than such as can reasonably be deduced from its language.

Clearly it was intended to alter the method by which a director of a company could be removed while still in office. It enacts that this can be done by the company by ordinary resolution. Furthermore, it may be achieved notwithstanding anything in the company's articles, or in any agreement between the company and the director.

Accordingly any case (and one knows there were many) where the articles prescribed that a director should be removable during his period of office only by a special resolution or an extraordinary resolution, each of which necessitated inter alia a three to one majority of those present and voting at the meeting, is overridden by section 184. A simple majority of the votes will now suffice; an ordinary resolution being, in my opinion, a resolution capable of being carried by such a majority. Similarly any agreement, whether evidenced by the articles or other vise, that a director shall be a director for life or for some fixed period is now also overreached.

The field over which section 184 operates is thus extensive for it includes, admittedly, all companies with a quotation on the Stock Exchange.

It is now contended, however, that it does something more; namely, that it provides in effect that when the ordinary resolution proposing the removal of the director is put to the meeting each shareholder present shall have one vote per share and no more: and that any provision in the articles providing that any shareholder shall, in relation to this resolution, have "weighted" votes attached to his shares, is also nullified by section 184. A provision for such "weighting" of votes which applies generally, that is as part of the normal pattern of voting, is accepted by the appellant as unobjectionable: but an article such as the one here under consideration which is special to a resolution seeking the removal of a director falls foul of section 184 and is overridden by it.

Why should this be? The section does not say so, as it easily could. and those who drafted it and enacted it certainly would have included among their numbers many who were familiar with the phenomenon of articles of association carrying "weighted votes." It must therefore have been plain at the outset that unless some special provision were made, the mere direction that an ordinary resolution would do in order to remove a director would leave the section at risk of being made inoperative in the way that has been done here. Yet no such provision was made, and in this Parliament followed its practice of leaving to companies and their shareholders liberty to allocate voting rights as they pleased.

When, therefore, it is said that a decision in favour of the respondent in this case would defeat the purpose of the section and make a mockery of it, it is being assumed that Parliament intended to cover every possible case and block up every loophole. I see no warrant for any such assumption. A very large part of the relevant field is in fact covered and covered effectively. and there may be good reasons why Parliament should leave some companies with freedom of maneuver in this particular matter. There are many small companies which are conducted in practice as though they were little more than partnerships, particularly family companies running a family business; and it is, unfortunately, sometimes necessary to provide some safeguard against family quarrels having their repercussions in the boardroom. I am not, of course, saying that this is such a case: I merely seek to repel the argument that unless the section is construed in the way the appellant wants, it has become "inept" and "frustrated."

== Significance ==
- Companies listed on the London Stock Exchange may not circumvent s 168 by their articles. So this has effect for non-listed companies. The LSE would refuse listing.
- Another technique for achieving the same result as in Bushell is to make three classes of shares, each with the right to appoint one director. You then have the protection against altering class rights. Or you could have a shareholder agreement.
- A weighted voting provision could potentially found an unfair prejudice petition under Companies Act 2006 s 994. Also, possibility of application by director for winding up order under s 122(1)(g) Insolvency Act 1986 and Companies Act 2006 ss. 994-996).
- A quorum provision could state a meeting is inquorate without a particular director. Again, this could give rise to a s 994 petition.

== See also ==
- United Kingdom company law
- Report of the Committee on Company Law Amendment
- Russell v Northern Bank Development Corp Ltd [1992] 1 WLR 588, a shareholder agreement to which the company was joined, to create no further share capital (contrary to what is now Companies Act 2006 s 617) was binding on shareholders but not the company
