= Say on pay =

Corporate law term

Say on pay is a term used for a role in corporate law whereby a firm's shareholders have the right to vote on the remuneration of executives. In the United States, this provision was ushered in when the Dodd-Frank Wall Street Reform and Consumer Protection Act was passed in 2010. While Say on Pay is a non-binding, advisory vote, failure reflects shareholder dissatisfaction with executive pay or company performance.

Often described in corporate governance or management theory as an agency problem, a corporation's managers are likely to overpay themselves because, directly or indirectly, they are allowed to pay themselves as a matter of general management power. Directors are elected to a board that has a fiduciary duty to protect the interests of the corporation. In large listed companies, executive compensation will usually be determined by a compensation committee composed of board members. Proponents argue that “say on pay” reforms strengthen the relationship between the board of directors and shareholders, ensuring that board members fulfil their fiduciary duty. Critics of the policy believe that “say on pay” does not effectively or comprehensibly monitor compensation, and consider it to be a reactionary policy rather than a proactive policy because it does not immediately affect the Board of Directors. Some argue it is counter-productive because it diminishes the authority of the Board of Directors. The effect of ‘say on pay’ measures can be binding or non-binding, depending on regulatory requirements or internal corporate policy as determined by proxy votes.

== Switzerland ==
On the 3rd of March, the Swiss voted by 69.7 per cent to ensure shareholders, pension funds and not banks, entirely control questions of executive pay. Shareholders must elect all members of a company's remuneration committee of all Swiss public listed companies. They further should receive annual votes on the identity of all members of the board of directors. The role that banks played in casting votes on other shareholders' behalf has been abolished.

== Australia ==
The Corporations Amendment (Improving Accountability on Director and Executive Remuneration) Act 2011 introduced in the Corporations Act 2001 new sections 250R(2), 250U-V, so that if at two consecutive meetings over 25% of shareholders vote against the directors' remuneration package, the directors have to stand for election again in 90 days.

== UK law ==
Originally UK company law set a default rule that the remuneration of directors was to be set, binding, by the company's general meeting, under Table A, article 54, attached to the Companies Act 1862. Over time more and more companies gave the right to directors, which is the position found in the Model Articles for companies today, that remuneration of the directors shall be determined by the directors.

The United Kingdom was the forerunner in mandating that shareholders be allowed a non-binding, or advisory vote on pay. In the UK, section 439 of the Companies Act 2006 mandates a vote on director pay at the yearly accounts meeting. Directors are expected to have disclosed their remuneration package in a "Remuneration Report" (section 420). Failure to do this leads to fines.

In addition, UK law regulates tightly several elements beyond basic director pay. Employee share schemes that directors have must be approved by ordinary resolution under the London Stock Exchange Listing Rule 9.4.1. Under the UK Corporate Governance Code, with which all listed companies must comply or explain why they do not, a binding vote on approval of long-term incentive plans is recommended. Under section 188 of the Companies Act 2006 a shareholder resolution is necessary to approve a director’s contract lasting more than a 2-year term (reduced from approval beyond a 5-year term under the old Companies Act 1985, section 319). Lastly, frivolous categories of compensation are limited under section 215, by prohibiting payments for loss of office (i.e. no golden parachutes), except, under section 220, in respect of damages for existing obligations and pensions.

Although the say on pay provision in section 439 is not binding on the board, the message in UK law is influential, because company members have an unrestricted right to fire any director, with reasonable notice, under section 168. The debate, however, moved on to whether the vote should become binding. Changes were introduced in the Enterprise and Regulatory Reform Act 2013 section 79 to make the overall policy of pay capable of being rejected by shareholders, but that no specific right to determine the amount has yet been introduced.

== US law ==
In the Dodd-Frank Wall Street Reform and Consumer Protection Act §951, a new say on pay provision was introduced.

There have been several recent efforts to require Say on Pay resolutions in the United States. In 2007, the Chairman of the Financial Services Committee Rep. Barney Frank sponsored legislation that was passed by the House of Representatives, giving shareholders a non-binding vote on executive compensation. Then Senator Barack Obama authored a "Say on Pay" proposal, but his legislation stalled in the Senate.

The economic crisis has affected corporate governance in the United States of America. The Emergency Economic Stabilization Act of 2008 (EESA), which established the Troubled Asset Relief Program, required say on pay resolutions at companies with outstanding funds from the TARP. In the American Recovery and Reinvestment Act of 2009, Senator Chris Dodd amended Section 111 of the EESA, and updated policy on Executive Compensation in Section 7. The amended legislation continued the "Say on Pay" policy established originally in the EESA.

On February 4, 2009, Treasury Secretary Timothy Geithner stated that companies that have received exceptional financial recovery assistance from the TARP fund would have to subject executive compensation to "Say on Pay" resolutions. On June 10, 2009, Secretary Geithner stated that the Administration supports "Say on Pay" legislation, and it would authorize the SEC authority to implement "Say on Pay" regulations at all companies, not only those that have outstanding funds from the TARP, contingent on Congressional approval. Additionally, the Treasury reconciled its proposals from February 4 with Congressional amendments to the EESA in the Final Interim Rule on TARP Standards for Compensation and Corporate Governance.

On July 31, 2009, H.R. 3269, the "Corporate and Financial Institution Compensation Fairness Act of 2009" passed the House of Representatives. The House bill included a section that allowed for a "say on pay" for all public institutions in the United States. Additionally, it had a provision for a shareholder vote on golden parachutes. In the Senate, Senator Charles Schumer introduced the Shareholder Bill of Rights. The House and Senate bills were reconciled in a final bill that was signed by President Obama on July 21, 2010, called The Dodd-Frank Wall Street Reform and Consumer Protection Act.

In 2012, only 2.6% of companies which voted on say on pay measures failed to pass them.

== EU law ==
The European Union has remained tentative about harmonising rules on CEO pay for a long time. In the High-Level Group of Company Law Experts' Final Report in 2002, they stated they would not wish to impose a requirement for voting EU-wide, yet.

"Some Member States require or are considering requiring, a form of a mandatory or advisory vote by

shareholders on the remuneration policy. We do not believe a shareholder vote on the remuneration policy generally should be an EU requirement, as the effects of such a vote can be different from Member State to Member State. The important thing is that

shareholders annually have the opportunity to debate the policy with the board.

However, a different approach is taken to share schemes, which were recommended to be more closely scrutinised.

In 2017, Directive (EU) 2017/828 (Shareholders Right Directive II) has taken some revolutionary steps in that matter in aim to eliminate practices based on short term gains. With transposition having its deadline on June 10, 2019, the directive introduced remunerative policies, which have to be approved by the shareholders. Earnings of each director (both executive and non-executive) shall be specified in accordance with these policies.

== German reforms ==
The Coalition Government of Germany has recently passed reforming legislation to the Stock Corporation Act to introduce a non-binding say on pay.

== Examples of shareholder revolts ==
Incidents at large UK companies in which shareholders have "revolted" against the size of pay awards given to board members since the "say on pay" legislation was introduced.

- Vodafone shareholders voted 10% against, and 30% in abstention from £13m in shares for CEO Sir Chris Gent. (July 2001)
- Royal & Sun Alliance shareholders voted 28% against a £250,000 retention bonus for CFO Julian Hance and £1.44m severance pay for CEO Bob Mendelsohn. The share price had just dropped. (May 2003)
- GlaxoSmithKline shareholders voted 50.72% (advisorily) against a £22m bonus salary and stock severance package for CEO Jean-Pierre Garnier. Chairman Sir Christopher Hogg said it was just the difference in culture to the US that was holding Britain back and they should accept it. The TUC had been lobbying pension funds. (May 2003)
- ITV shareholders were 40% against a £15m (£1.8m cash, rest shares) payoff to Chairman Michael Green. It was justified on the basis that he would have taken legal action were it not paid, because he was removed prior to the Carlton/Granada merger.
- Berkley Managing Director and founder of the property company had 47% of shareholders vote against his £1.2m (out of a total £4.7m package) under a long-term incentive scheme that he had not actually belonged to. (August 2003)
- Unilever Former chairman Niall Fitzgerald got £1.2m after profits fell. (April 2005)
- Tesco shareholders voted 15% against an £11.5m bonus on Sir Terry Leahy’s salary as CEO. It was linked to the success of the firm's Fresh & Easy chain in the US. The Association of British Insurers and PIRC were against it. (June 2007)

In the first year of mandatory shareholder advisory "say on pay" voting in the US, 37 Russell 3000 companies failed to receive majority support from shareholders. In the second year of voting, 44 Russell 3000 companies have failed as of June 12, 2012. Companies include:

- Nabors Industries shareholders voted against "say on pay" in both 2011 and 2012 (75% opposition in 2012) given concerns over the company's high CEO pay and severance payments. Shareholders also voted against the company's new incentive bonus plan and long-term incentive plan in 2012.
- Hewlett Packard failed a "say on pay" vote in 2011 in light of new CEO Léo Apotheker's employment agreement and the company's stock performance.
- Citigroup failed "say on pay" with 55% opposition in 2012 after giving CEO Vikram Pandit three retention grants valued at $27.9 million.

== Academic skepticism ==
Brian Cheffins of Cambridge University and Randall Thomas of Vanderbilt University predicted that a "say on pay" could hold back sudden jumps, but it would not stop the general upward drift in pay rates. Ryan Krause and colleagues argued that "say on pay" offered little information to the board of directors beyond disapproval of CEO compensation not being in line with firm performance. Another academic study shows that the introduction of "say on pay" in 14 countries, did not increase the market value of shareholder voting rights in the average firm. However, while stricter, binding SoP reforms increased voting values, looser advisory SoP laws decreased them.

== See also ==
- Board of directors
- Corporate governance
- Executive compensation
- Form 10-K
