= Shareholders in the United Kingdom =

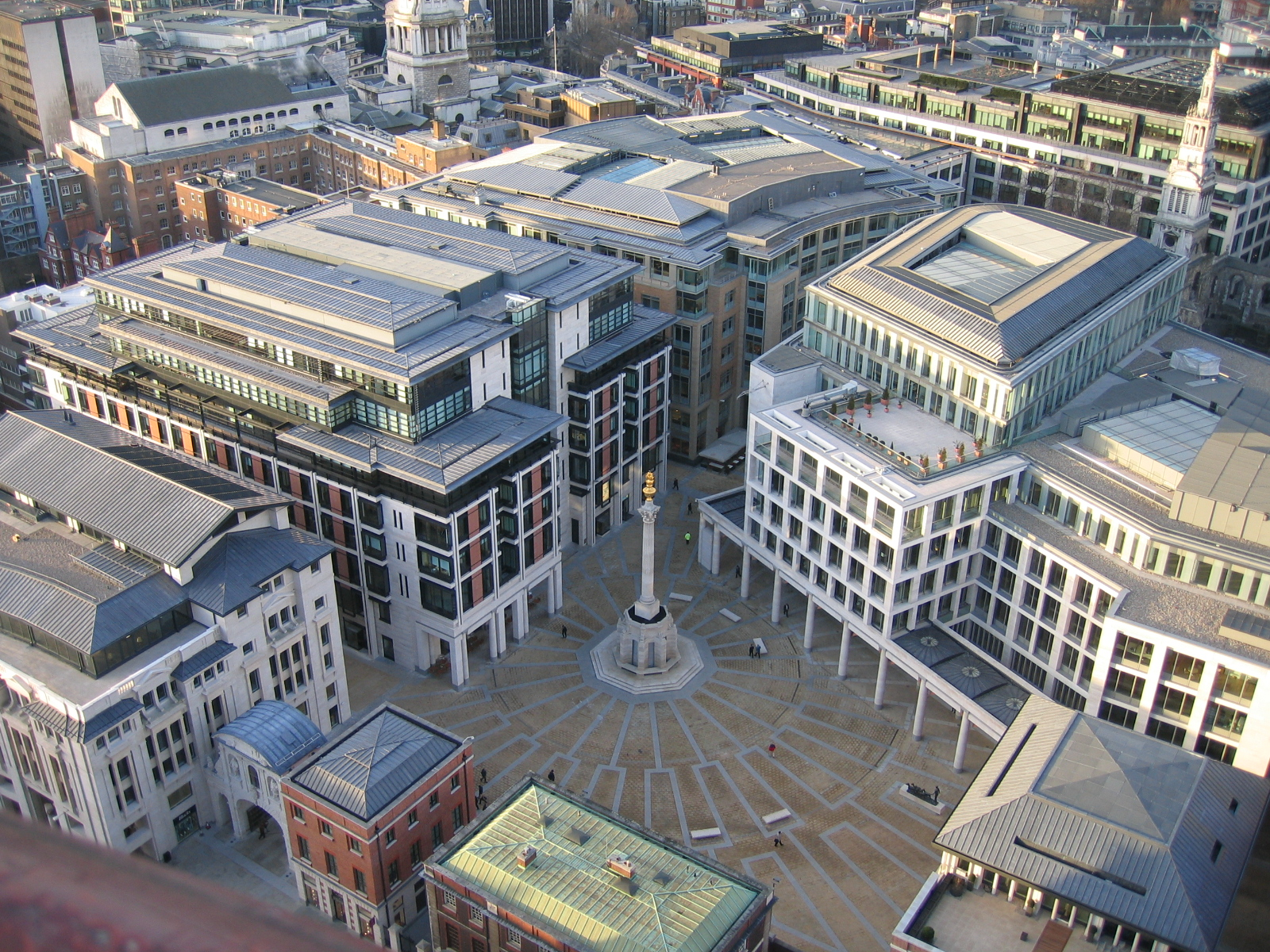
The London Stock Exchange at Paternoster Square.

Shareholders in the United Kingdom are people and organisations who buy shares in UK companies. In large companies, such as those on the FTSE100, shareholders are overwhelmingly large institutional investors, such as pension funds, insurance companies, mutual funds or similar foreign organisations. UK shareholders have the most favourable set of rights in the world in their ability to control directors of corporations. UK company law gives shareholders the ability to,

- remove the board of directors with a simple majority of votes
- change the company constitution with a three quarter vote (unless a higher figure is in the constitution)
- wind up (i.e. liquidate) the company with a three quarter vote
- veto any sale of a significant percentage of company assets
- veto by a majority any restriction on ability to freely trade their shares, such as a poison pill

Shareholders also owe one another duties, and owe duties under the Stewardship Code to exercise their voting power.

== Types of shareholder ==
=== Pension funds ===
- Association of Member Nominated Trustees
- National Association of Pension Funds
- Pensions & Investment Research Consultants

Largest private UK pension funds

- BT, Royal Mail and Hermes Pension Management
- Universities Superannuation Scheme
- British Coal Pension Schemes
- Electricity Supply Pension
- NatWest Group
- Railway Pensions
- Barclays
- Lloyds TSB
- BP

Largest public service UK pension funds

- Local Government Pension Scheme
  - London Pensions Fund Authority
- Teachers’ Pension Scheme
- NHS Pension Scheme
- Civil Service Pension Scheme
- Police Pension Scheme
- Firefighters' Pension Scheme
- Armed Forces Pension Scheme

=== Insurance funds ===
- Aviva
- Legal & General
- AXA
- Standard Life
- Friends Provident
- Allianz
- Brit plc
- Royal & SunAlliance
- Royal London
- RSA Insurance Group
- The Equitable Life Assurance Society
- Scottish Widows, part of Lloyds Banking Group

=== Mutual investment funds ===
- Investment Management Association at 65 Kingsway (est 2002 from a merger of Association of Unit Trust and Investment Funds, renamed in 1993 after the Unit Trust Association est 1959, and the Fund Managers Association)
- Unit trust
- Open-ended investment company
- Fidelity Investments
- Jupiter Fund Management
- M&G Investments, part of Prudential plc
- HSBC
- Old Mutual

== Shareholder rights ==
Shareholders provide an essential source of capital investment to corporations, and because of the bargaining position this confers, shareholders typically gain a comprehensive set of governance rights under a constitution. While not technically required, shareholders invariably possess exclusive voting rights, in contrast to many other European jurisdictions which require that employees codetermine (i.e. have the right to elect some of) the members of the board. In this way, and also because of the additional mandatory rights shareholders enjoy under the Companies Act 2006, the UK is a "shareholder friendly" jurisdiction relative to its European and American counterparts.

=== Elections ===
Since the Report of the Committee on Company Law Amendment, chaired in 1945 by Lord Cohen, led to the Companies Act 1947, as voters in the general meeting of public companies, shareholders have the mandatory right to remove directors by a simple majority, now under CA 2006 section 168.

By comparison, in Germany, and in most American companies (predominantly incorporated in Delaware) directors can only be removed for a "good reason".

=== Constitution ===
Shareholders will habitually have the right to change the company's constitution with a three quarter majority vote, unless they have chosen to entrench the constitution with a higher threshold.

=== Meetings and resolutions ===
Shareholders with support of 5 per cent of the total vote can call meetings, and can circulate suggestions for resolutions with support of 5 per cent of the total vote, or any one hundred other shareholders holding over £100 in shares each.

=== Executive pay ===
Shareholder have say on pay of directors under CA 2006 section 439. For the time being, this is non-binding.

=== Significant transactions ===
Categories of important decisions, such as large asset sales, approval of mergers, takeovers, winding up of the company, any expenditure on political donations, and share buybacks. Other transactions where directors have a conflict of interest that require binding approval of shareholders are ratification of corporate opportunities, large self dealing transactions and service contracts lasting over two years.

Companies cannot make political donations without approval of the general meeting.

=== Classes of shares ===
It is possible for companies to create different classes of shares to provide different groups of shareholders with different shareholder rights. For example, different shareholder rights could be given to different groups of shareholders such as founders, investors and employees. The shareholders rights capable of variation include: dividend rights, voting tights and capital rights. Capital rights are the right to receive capital following a sale of the company, liquidation or upon an asset sale. It is common to see different rights for different shareholders and preferences.

- Companies Act 2006, ss 21(1) and 25
- Citco Banking Corporation NV v Pusser's Ltd [2007] 2 BCLC 483
- Companies Act 2006 ss 629–633
- Greenhalgh v Arderne Cinemas Ltd [1946] 1 All ER 512
- Cumbrian Newspapers Group Ltd v Cumberland & Westmoreland Herald Ltd [1987] Ch 1
- Companies Act 2006, ss 22–24
- Russell v Northern Bank Development Corp Ltd [1992] 3 All ER 161

== Shareholder duties ==
=== Activism ===
Despite habitually occupying the most privileged position in UK corporate governance, shareholders in large public companies listed on the London Stock Exchange infrequently exercise their governance rights. Institutional investors, including pension funds, mutual funds and insurance funds, own most shares. Thousands or perhaps millions of persons, particularly through pensions, are beneficiaries from the returns on shares. Historically institutions have often not voted or participated in general meetings on their beneficiaries' behalf, and often display an uncritical pattern of supporting management. However, institutional investors also often work "behind the scenes" to secure better corporate governance for their members, through informal but direct communication with management. Individual shareholders form an increasingly small part of total investments, while foreign investment and institutional investor ownership have grown their share steadily over the last forty years. Institutional investors, who deal with other peoples' money, are bound by fiduciary obligations, deriving from the law of trusts and obligations to exercise care deriving from the common law. Now the Stewardship Code 2010, drafted by the Financial Reporting Council (the corporate governance watchdog), reinforces the duty on institutions to actively engage in governance affairs by disclosing their voting policy, voting record and voting. The aim is to make directors more accountable, at least, to investors of capital.

== See also ==
- UK company law
- Shareholder Rights Directive
