= By-law =

Type of law in municipalities

Feet on seats on railways are generally in breach of a by-law.

A by-law (bye-law, by(e)law, by(e) law) is a set of rules or law established by an organization or community so as to regulate itself, as allowed or provided for by some higher authority. The higher authority, generally a legislature or some other government body, establishes the degree of control that the by-laws may exercise. By-laws may be established by entities such as a business corporation, a neighbourhood association, or depending on the jurisdiction, a municipality.

In the United Kingdom and some Commonwealth countries, the local laws established by municipalities are referred to as by(e)-laws because their scope is regulated by the central governments of those nations. Accordingly, a bylaw enforcement officer is the Canadian equivalent of the American code enforcement officer or municipal regulations enforcement officer. In the United States, the federal government and most state governments have no direct ability to regulate the single provisions of municipal law. As a result, terms such as code, ordinance, or regulation, if not simply law, are more common.

== Etymology ==
The Merriam-Webster Dictionary indicates that the origin of the word by-law is from the English word bilawe, probably from Old Norse *bȳlǫg, from Old Norse bȳr town + lag-, lǫg law. The earliest use of the term originates from the Viking town law in the Danelaw, wherein by is the Old Norse word for a larger settlement as in Whitby and Derby (compare with the modern Danish-Norwegian word by meaning town, or the modern Swedish word by, meaning village). However, it is also possible that this usage was forgotten and the word was "reinvented" in modern times through the use of the adverbial prefix by- giving the meaning of subsidiary law or side-law (as in byway). In any case, it is incorrect to claim that the word is related to the prepositional phrase "by law"; that is a modern conjecture contradicted by the evidence.

== Municipal by-laws ==
Municipal by-laws are public regulatory laws; which apply in a certain area. The main difference between a by-law and a law passed by a national/federal or regional/state body is that a by-law is made by a non-sovereign body, which derives its authority from another governing body, and can only be made on a limited range of matters. A local council or municipal government derives its power to pass laws through a law of the national or regional government which specifies what things the town or city may regulate through by-laws. It is therefore a form of delegated legislation. Within its jurisdiction and specific to those areas mandated by the higher body, a municipal by-law is no different from any other law of the land, and can be enforced with penalties, challenged in court, and must comply with other laws of the land, such as the country's constitution. Municipal by-laws are often enforceable through the public justice system, and offenders can be charged with a criminal offence for breach of a by-law. Common by-laws include vehicle parking and stopping regulations, animal control, building and construction, licensing, noise, zoning and business regulation, and management of public recreation areas.

=== Japan ===
Under Article 94 of the Constitution of Japan, regional governments have limited autonomy and legislative powers to create by-laws. In practice, such powers are exercised in accordance with the Local Autonomy Law.

By-laws therefore constitute part of the legal system subordinate to the Japanese constitution. In terms of its mandatory powers and effective, it is considered the lowest of all legislation possible.

Such powers are used to govern the following:

- Location of the seat of government of the prefecture
- Frequency of routine meetings
- Number of prefectural vice-governors and vice village leaders
- Number of staff attached to administrative bodies governed
- Placement of regional autonomous areas
- Regulation of certain municipal monies
- Placement, maintenance and removal of public facilities
- Appointment of subordinate offices by the prefectural governor

=== United Kingdom ===
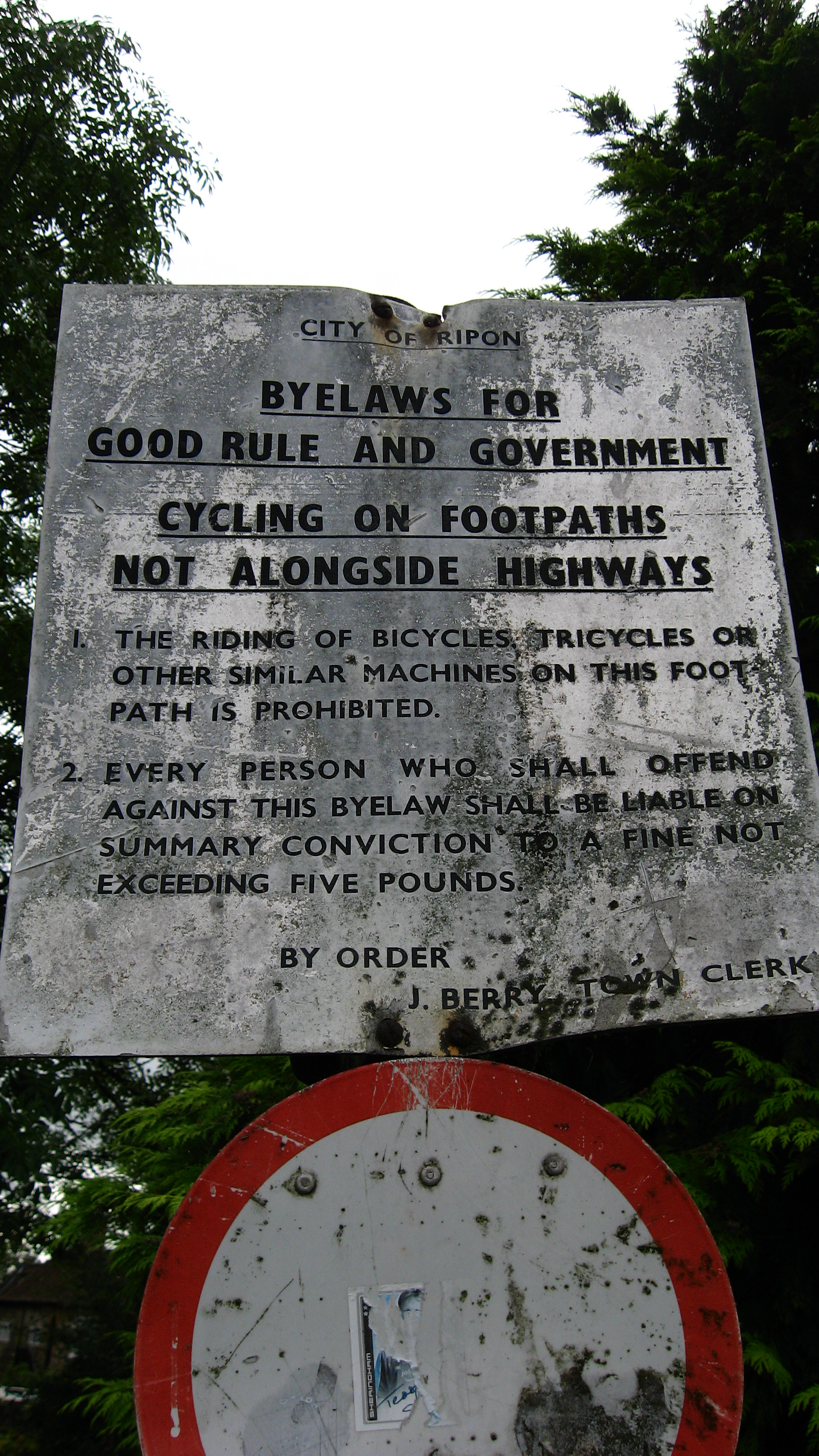
"Byelaws for good rule and government" in Ripon, North Yorkshire

In the United Kingdom, by-laws are laws of local or limited application made by local councils or other bodies, using powers granted by an act of Parliament, and so are a form of delegated legislation.

=== Australia ===
In Australian law there are five types of by-law, and they are established by statute:

- State government authorities create by-laws as a type of "statutory rule" under an empowering act; such by-laws must be made (or at least formally approved) by the state governor.
- Local government by-laws are the most prevalent type of by-law in Australia, and regulate such things as parking, drinking alcohol in public places, fire prevention, and zoning controls. In New South Wales these by-laws are called ordinances, and zoning controls are called Environmental Planning Instruments created under the Environmental Planning and Assessment Act.
- Numerous specific institutions, including universities, are also empowered to make by-laws by their establishing legislation.
- By-laws of a company or society are created as a contract among members, and a formal process must be followed to adopt or amend them.
- Strata title was developed in Australia and by-laws of body corporate are also empowered by state legislation. Many people come into contact with strata by-laws on a regular basis, since they affect what people living in strata title housing can do in their homes. The most well-known of these is the "no pets in flats" rule.

== Organizational by-laws ==
Corporate and organizational by-laws regulate only the organization to which they apply and are generally concerned with the operation of the organization, setting out the form, manner, or procedure in which a company or organisation should be run. Corporate by-laws are drafted by a corporation's founders or directors under the authority of its charter or articles of incorporation.

=== Typical articles ===
By-laws widely vary from organization to organization, but generally cover topics such as the purpose of the organization, who are its members, how directors are elected, how meetings are conducted, and what officers the organization will have and a description of their duties. A common mnemonic device for remembering the typical articles in by-laws is NOMOMECPA, pronounced "No mommy, see pa!" It stands for name, object, members, officers, meetings, executive board, committees, parliamentary authority, amendment. Organizations may use a book such as Robert's Rules of Order Newly Revised for guidelines on the content of their by-laws. This book has a sample set of by-laws of the type that a small, independent society might adopt.

The wording of the by-laws has to be precise. Otherwise, the meaning may be open to interpretation. In such cases, the organization decides how to interpret its by-laws and may use guidelines for interpretation.

=== Amendment ===
Usually, one of the last sections in the by-laws describes the procedures for amending them. It describes who can amend them (usually the membership, but it could be the organization's board of directors), how much notice is needed, and how much of a vote is needed. A typical requirement is a two-thirds vote provided that previous notice was given or a majority of all the members.

=== Relation to other governing documents ===
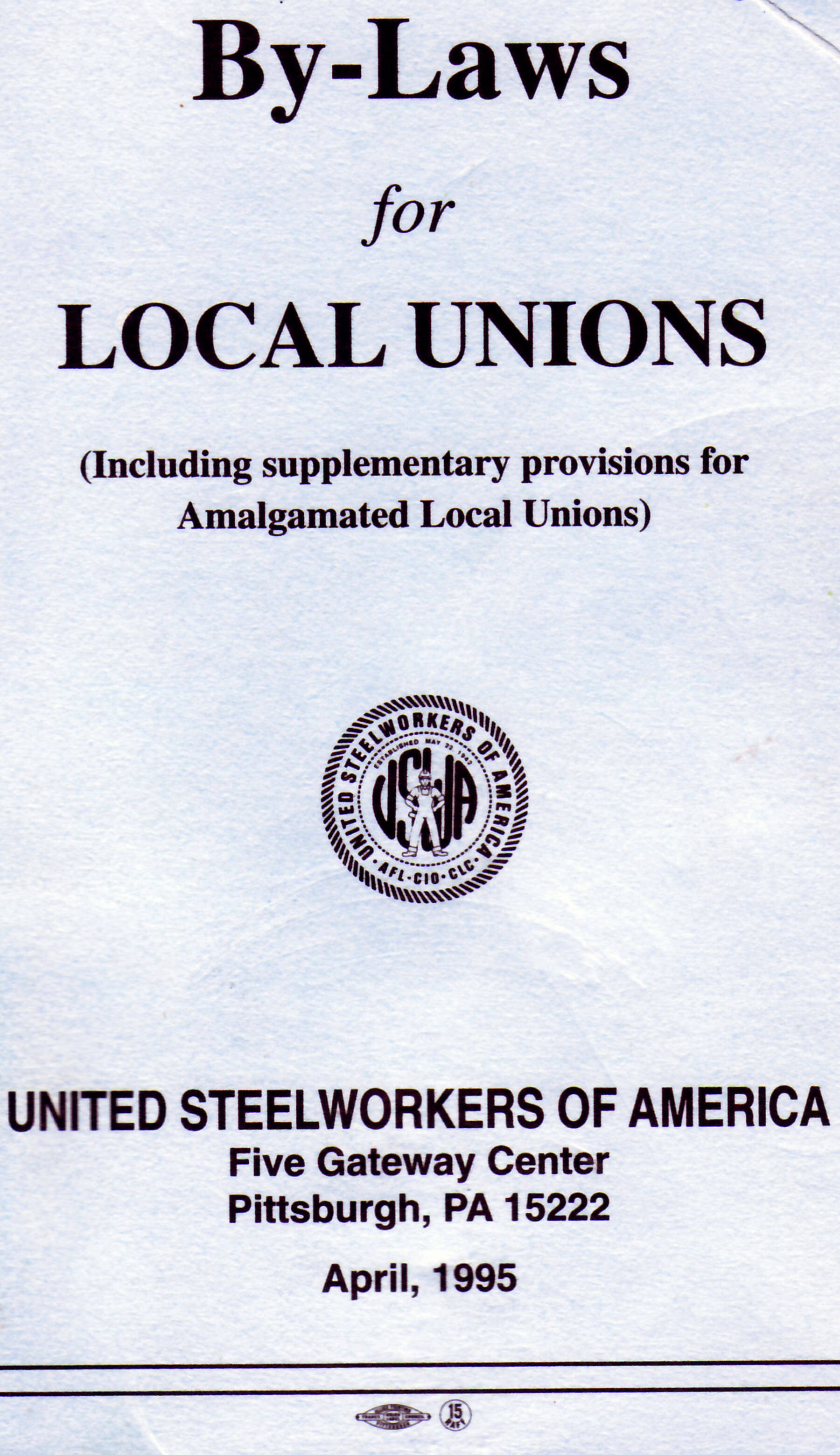
Cover of guideline document by United Steelworkers to form the basis of by-laws that may be adopted by a local union

In parliamentary procedure, including Robert's Rules of Order, the by-laws are generally the supreme governing document of an organization, superseded only by the charter of an incorporated society. The by-laws contain the most fundamental principles and rules regarding the nature of the organization.

It was once common practice for organizations to have two separate governing documents, a constitution and by-laws, but this has fallen out of favor because of the ease of use, increased clarity, and reduced chance of conflict inherent in a single, unified document. This single document, while properly referred to as the by-laws, is often referred to as a constitution or a constitution and by-laws. Unless otherwise provided by law, the organization does not formally exist until by-laws have been adopted.

=== Application to organizations ===
==== Unions ====
In some countries, trade unions generally have constitutions, which govern activities of the international office of the union as well as how it interfaces with its locals. The locals themselves can set up their own by-laws to set out internal rules for how to conduct activities.

In other countries, such as the United Kingdom, union by-laws are sometimes a subset of the union's constitution or implement the union's rules in more detail.

==== Nonprofit organizations ====
Nonprofit organizations in the United States applying for Federal Tax-Exemption Status are required to adopt bylaws for their organizations. Bylaws for nonprofit organizations by themselves are more of an internal organizing document than required by most states but are necessary for filing for nonprofit 501(c)(3) tax-exemption application using the Form 1023.

==== Chartered corporations ====
For corporations incorporated by royal charter in the UK, the charter and bylaws form the governance documents approved when then charter is granted. Changes to these bylaws require the approval of the Privy Council.

==== Universities ====
For British universities incorporated by royal charter the principal bylaws are normally termed statutes, a terminology deriving originally from the University of Cambridge. As for other chartered corporations, revision of these statutes requires the approval of the Privy Council.

For British universities incorporated as civil corporations (Oxford and Cambridge), colleges of Oxford and Cambridge universities, and universities that are statutory corporations under individual acts of Parliament (Durham, London, Newcastle and Royal Holloway), the procedure for revision of the bylaws (known as statutes) is defined in the relevant legislation. For Oxford and Cambridge and their colleges, this is the Universities of Oxford and Cambridge Act 1923, under which amendments to some statutes (the King-in-Council statutes) must be approved by the King in Council and laid before parliament, while others can be amended by the university without approval. For Durham and Newcastle, it is the Universities of Durham and Newcastle-upon-Tyne Act 1963, under which amendments to statutes must be approved by the King in Council. For Royal Holloway, this is the Royal Holloway and Bedford New College Act 1985, and for London, it is the University of London Act 2018, under both of which statute amendments must be approved by the Privy Council.

Below the statutes in most older British universities are further forms of bylaw normally termed ordinances and regulations. These are usually more detailed and may be amended by the university's council (or equivalent governing body) without any need for outside approval.

For British universities incorporated as higher education corporations (HEC) under the Education Reform Act 1988, the procedure for revision of their bylaws, known as articles of government, is defined by that act. For HECs in Scotland and Wales, amendments must be approved by the Privy Council but HECs in England gained the freedom to revise their own articles of government (subject to them remaining a charity) under the Higher Education and Research Act 2017.

British universities incorporated as companies limited by guarantee or as companies limited by shares are free to amend their own bylaws as is normal for other corporations of these forms.

Whatever their constitutional form, the governing documents of universities in England, including their bylaws (however these are termed) "must uphold the public interest governance principles that are applicable to the provider" under the Office for Students' Regulatory framework for higher education in England. These include: protecting academic freedom; operating openly, honestly, accountably and with integrity; student engagement with governance; effective academic governance by the senate or similar body; comprehensive risk management and control; transparency about value for money; ensuring freedom of speech within the law; having a governing body of appropriate size, composition, diversity and skills mix; ensuring governing body members and senior managers are fit and proper persons; and keeping records of the source of their degree awarding powers. For public universities, additional public interest governance principles include: having at least one (and more as appropriate) independent member of the governing body; and having arrangements to ensure public funds are managed appropriately.

The term statutes is also used for university bylaws at some universities in the US, such as the University of Illinois. However, others, such as Cornell University, use the term bylaws. In both of these cases, amendment is by the board of trustees with no external oversight.

== See also ==
- Articles of association
- Articles of organization
- Civil law (common law)
- Constitutional documents
- Law
- Legal treatise
- Memorandum of association
- Municipal charter
- Natural law
- Outline of management
- Private governance
