= Service address =

A service address is an address which can be used as an alternative to a residential address for the purpose of receiving post in the United Kingdom. Service address providers often scan and digitise mail received for the recipient to view online.

Service addresses have grown in popularity since 2009 as a method of keeping a residential address off public records and providing better protection for those who operate a business from home.

== Business ==
The Companies Act 2006 introduced a relaxation on the type of address a company can provide to Companies House which is then made available to the public. The Act confirmed that from October 2009 a company director is allowed to provide a service address which will be kept on public record, along with their usual residential address which is kept privately. The residential address provided to Companies House can now be protected and only provided to certain approved bodies, including HM Revenue & Customs, the Police and Credit Reference Agencies. This allows company directors of sensitive companies to not have their address publicised by Companies House.

In order for a company to comply with the regulation, the service address chosen must be in the same judicial area where the company is registered. For example, if a company is registered in England & Wales the service address must also be within England & Wales. The service address can act as the registered office for the company. Although the relaxation in law allows a service address to be used, a PO Box or DX number can still not be used by a director.

The legislation also provides for the Registrar of Companies to ban the use of a service address and place the usual residential address on the public record, if the service address is found to be ineffective. These types of addresses can provide extra protection for owners of businesses with sensitive interests, where company directors and their properties may be at risk from protesters and activists.

== Personal use ==
While initially used as a way for company directors to protect their residential address, service addresses are also used by many for personal use.

An expat can use a service address as a way of continuing to receive post in their home country. It is particularly useful for expats who have sold their property and no longer have a permanent residential address to ensure that post is still viewed by the recipient which arrives after leaving the home country. It is a quicker method of viewing post than other redirection services
