= Private company limited by shares =

Type of business entity

A private company limited by shares is a class of private limited company incorporated under the laws of England and Wales, Hong Kong, Northern Ireland, Scotland, certain Commonwealth jurisdictions, or the Republic of Ireland. It has shareholders with limited liability and its shares may not be offered to the general public, unlike those of a public limited company.

"Limited by shares" means that the liability of the shareholders to creditors of the company is limited to the capital originally invested, i.e. the nominal value of the shares and any premium paid in return for the issue of the shares by the company. A shareholder's personal assets are thus protected in the event of the company's insolvency, but any money invested in the company may be lost.

A limited company may be "private" or "public". A private limited company's disclosure requirements are lighter, but its shares may not be offered to the general public and therefore cannot be traded on a public stock exchange. This is the major difference between a private limited company and a public limited company. Most companies, particularly small companies, are private.

== Company officers ==
In the United Kingdom, every company must have formally appointed company officers. By statute, a private company must have at least one director and until April 2008 also had to have a secretary. The company's articles of association may require more than one director. At least one director must be an individual, not another company.

Anybody can be a director, subject to certain exceptions. A person who is yet to be discharged from bankruptcy or who has been banned from being a company director by the court will be prohibited. In addition, natural persons must have the legal capacity to consent to their appointment as director of a limited company. As of October 2008, the minimum age required to give this consent is 16 years of age. This change was applied retroactively, with any directors under the age of 16 being removed from the register upon the implementation of the Companies Act 2006. This was already the case in Scotland, under the Age of Legal Capacity (Scotland) Act 1991.

No formal qualifications are required to be a company director or secretary, but the company must comply with many laws and regulations, regardless of such qualifications or the lack of them.

Certain non-British nationals are restricted as to the work they may undertake in the UK, depending upon their visas, work permits, national insurance payments center location and tax details, training, English language and professional indemnity insurances.

As of October 2008 (Companies Act 2006), it is no longer necessary to obtain a court order to withhold a director's address, as a "service address" can be supplied as well, with the residential address being held as protected information at Companies House.

=== Share capital ===
When a limited company is formed it must issue one or more subscriber shares to its initial members. It may increase capitalisation by issue of further shares. The issued share capital of the company is the total number of shares existing in the company multiplied by the nominal value of each share.

A company incorporated in England and Wales can be created with any number of shares of any nominal value, expressed in any currency. For example, there may be 10,000 shares with a nominal value of 1p, or 100 shares of £1 each. In each case the share capital would be £100.

Unissued shares can be issued at any time by the directors using a Form SH01 - Return of Allotment of Shares (Companies Act 2006 § 555) subject to prior authorisation by the shareholders.

Transfers of shares in a private company usually occur by private agreement between the seller and the buyer, as they may not be offered to the general public. A stock transfer form is required to register the transfer with the company. The articles of association of private companies often place restrictions on the transfer of shares.

=== Company accounts ===
A company's first accounts must start on the day of incorporation. The first financial year must end on the accounting reference date, or a date up to seven days either side of this date. Subsequent accounts start on the day following the year-end date of the previous accounts. They end on the next accounting reference date or a date up to seven days either side.

If a company's accounts are delivered late there is an automatic penalty which is between £150 and £1,500 for a private company.

The first accounts of a private company must be delivered:

- within nine months of the end of the accounting reference period; or
- if the accounting reference period is more than 12 months, within 22 months of the date of incorporation, or three months from the end of the accounting reference period, whichever is longer.

A company may change its accounting reference date by sending Form 225 to the Registrar.

=== Confirmation statement ===
Every limited company must file annually a confirmation statement (previously an annual return), as required by section 853A of the Companies Act 2006, which confirms that its information held at Companies House is correct.

Historically, Companies House would send a pre-printed form to each company's registered office to help meet this filing requirement, but paper reminders were discontinued in November 2020. Instead, companies can sign up to receive an email reminder when their confirmation statement is due. This statement must be filed no later than 14 days after the due date, and can be filed online using a Companies House service or by post. Following successive price increases in May 2024 and February 2026 to fund Companies House's enhanced powers of investigation under the Economic Crime and Corporate Transparency Act 2023 (ECCTA), the fee for online submission is £50 and the fee for postal submission is £110.

=== Company Tax Return ===
A private company limited by shares must also file for every financial year a Tax Return with HMRC. By using a government online service, this can be done at the same time as delivering the accounts to Companies House. The deadline for delivering the return is 12 months after the accounting period ends.

=== Registered office ===
Every company must have a registered office, which does not need to be its usual business address; it is often the address of the company's lawyers or accountants. All official letters and documents from government departments (including HMRC and Companies House) will be sent to this address, which must be shown on all official company documents. The registered office can be anywhere in England and Wales, or Scotland if the company is registered there.

== Formation ==
To incorporate a company in the UK, the following documents, together with the registration fee, must be sent to the Registrar of Companies:

- Form IN01
- The articles of association
- The memorandum of association

The memorandum of association states the name of the company, the registered office and the company objectives. The objective of a company may simply be stated as being to carry out business as a general commercial company. The memorandum delivered to the Registrar must be signed by each subscriber in front of a witness who must attest the signature.

The articles of association govern the company's internal affairs. The company's articles delivered to the Registrar must be signed by each subscriber in front of a witness who must attest the signature.

Form IN01 states the first directors, the first secretary, and the address of the registered office. Each director must give their name, address, date of birth, and occupation. Each officer appointed, and each subscriber (or their agent), must sign and date the form.

Applications may also be submitted directly to Companies House and HMRC online via the GOV.UK website; as of February 2026, the fee for online incorporation is £100.

In other jurisdictions, companies must make similar applications to the relevant registrar, such as the Companies Registration Office, Ireland, in the Republic of Ireland, or the Registrar of Companies in India.

== Additional information ==
=== Redundant companies ===
Private companies that have not traded or otherwise carried on business for at least three months may apply to the Registrar to be struck off the register. Alternatively, the company may be voluntarily liquidated.

=== Converting to a public limited company ===
A private company limited by shares, or an unlimited company with a share capital, may re-register as a public limited company (PLC). A private company must pass a special resolution that it be so re-registered and deliver a copy of the resolution together with an application form 43(3)(e) to the Registrar.

== See also ==
- Private company limited by guarantee
- Privately held company
- Limited liability company (LLC)
- Gesellschaft mit beschränkter Haftung (GmbH)
- Aktiengesellschaft (AG)/others
