= London Pensions Fund Authority =

Local government pension fund

London Pensions Fund Authority (LPFA)
- Website: https://www.lpfa.org.uk/

The London Pensions Fund Authority (LPFA) is a local government pension fund. It was formed in 1989 to fill the gap left by the 1986 dissolution of the Greater London Council (GLC) in administering that body's pension fund. It has taken on residual responsibilities for the employees of several other defunct organisations, including the Inner London Education Authority (ILEA) and the London Residuary Body (LRB).

In 2016 LPFA created the Local Pensions Partnership in collaboration with the Lancashire County Pension Fund to pool resources and improve management for the benefit of their members and employers. The LPP was set up to be open to other Local Government Pension Scheme and public sector funds in the UK.

As of March 2022, the LPFA itself had around £7.6 billion of assets under management with over 93,000 members in the fund.

Throughout its existence as a well known public sector pension scheme, the LPFA has been a key figure in influencing the Local Government Pension Scheme for local government employees and others across the United Kingdom and is described by Bloomberg, as among "the world's biggest investors". It contributes to debates on issues related to the world economy and has a public commitment to responsible investment. In 2008, it was an active part of a major global coalition of large institutional investors highlighting concerns about the economic impacts of global climate change.

On 2 November 2022, the LPFA published their Investor Climate Action Plan which outlines their commitment to be a net zero pension fund.

== See also ==
- UK labour law
- Shareholders in the United Kingdom
- Local Government Pension Scheme
