= Local Pensions Partnership =

Local Pensions Partnership (LPP) is a national UK local government pension scheme services provider set up and launched by the London Pensions Fund Authority and Lancashire County Pension Fund in April 2016.

LPP was established to enable public sector schemes to pool resources and improve management of their assets for the benefit of their members and employers. It is open to all members of the Local Government Pension Scheme and public sector funds in the UK.

It had £26.3 billion of assets under management in June 2024 and according to its website and serves 660,000 members from more than 2,000 different employers.
