= Constitutional documents =

Foundational legal documents of an organization

In relation to juristic persons, the constitutional documents (sometimes referred to as the charter documents) are the documents which define the existence of an entity and regulate the structure and control of that entity and its members. The precise form of the constitutional documents depends upon the type of entity, such as corporations or private associations.

== Companies ==
By convention, most common law jurisdictions divide the constitutional documents of companies into two separate documents:

- the Memorandum of Association (in some countries referred to as the Articles of Incorporation) is the primary document, and will generally regulate the company's activities with the outside world, such as the company's objects and powers.
- the Articles of Association (in some countries referred to as the by-laws) is the secondary document, and will generally regulate the company's internal affairs and management, such as procedures for board meetings, dividend entitlements etc.

In many countries, only the primary document is filed, and the secondary document remains private. In other countries, both documents are filed.

In civil law jurisdictions, the company's constitution is normally consolidated into a single document, often called the charter.

It is quite common for members of a company to supplement the corporate constitution with additional arrangements, such as shareholders' agreements, whereby they agree to exercise their membership rights in a certain way. Conceptually a shareholders' agreement fulfills many of the same functions as the corporate constitution, but because it is a contract, it will not normally bind new members of the company unless they accede to it somehow. One benefit of shareholders' agreement is that they will usually be confidential, as most jurisdictions do not require shareholders' agreements to be publicly filed.

Another common method of supplementing the corporate constitution is by means of voting trusts, although these are relatively uncommon outside of the United States and certain offshore jurisdictions...

== Partnerships ==
Partnerships also have constitutional documents in the form of a partnership agreement. In some jurisdictions, a more formal constitution, sometimes referred to as articles of partnership or a partnership deed is used (particularly where the partnership has certain corporate aspects, such as a Limited Liability Partnership). However, many partnerships are not created formally, and may have no written partnership agreement and leave the regulation of the partnership to be regulated in accordance with the understandings of the parties and by general law. Some of the largest partnerships in the world have no written partnership agreement.

== Trusts ==
A trust is not a separate legal entity as such, but is often treated as one for certain legal purposes. Like partnerships, trusts are not normally required to have a written trust instrument to constitute them, although most large and formal trusts do.

== Unincorporated associations ==
An unincorporated association may also have a constitution which provides for the rights and remedies of the members as between themselves, and governs the conduct of the association. Because, in most legal systems, unincorporated associations do not have separate legal personality, this aspect of the constitutional documents is not applicable. In most legal systems unincorporated associations are not required to have formal written constitutions, but many of the larger and more complex organisations would be almost impossible to administer without one.
