= Celebrity board director =

A celebrity board director is an officer with significant influence in the company's governance decision-making process and who possesses one or more celebrity traits including credibility, goodwill, rights, image, influence, liability, and standard of value. A director's leadership and decision-making affects the governance and wealth maximization of shareholders’ wealth.

A question remains whether the perception of a celebrity board director is a universal phenomenon or specific to boards within the United States. A definition for celebrity is a famous person or a person who is widely known in society and business who commands a degree of public and media attention. The phenomenon of celebrity that indicates celebrity requires not only fame but also fame with an evident monetary value.

In the case of a celebrity board director and corporate governance practice, the shareholders’ wealth potential is at stake. Effective corporate governance requires leadership in addition to influence. Many U.S. companies have long stocked the company’s board with a number of influential directors (see Table 1). A company’s leadership expects the celebrity component of a celebrity director to bring perceived value, press, and investor interest.

== Celebrity board director criteria ==
A number of important board member considerations relevant to considering whether or not a board director holds celebrity status, are celebrity, credibility, goodwill, rights, standard of value, directorship, image, influence, as well as celebrity liability.
A celebrity is a famous person or a person who is widely known both in society and in the business community who commands a degree of public and media attention. A celebrity possesses one or more traits of the following traits: credibility, goodwill, rights, image, influence, liabilities, and standard of value.

Celebrity credibility represents a situation in which an individual has been elevated to the level of a celebrity due to his or her degree of recognition and distinctive qualities.
Celebrity goodwill reflects a number of factors including age, health, past earning power, reputation, skill, comparative success, and length of time in business.

Celebrity rights represent a person with celebrity status and associated rights where specific, identifiable, and tangible assets or items of intellectual property relate to a person’s celebrity status.
Celebrity standard of value represents a measure of celebrity goodwill. Celebrity goodwill can be associated with a celebrity’s image and influence can be expressed through a celebrity’s endorsement, a celebrity’s credibility, or a celebrity’s goodwill.

Board Director is an officer with significant influence in a company’s governance decision-making who is charged with impeccable credentials as an agent on behalf of the shareholders.
Celebrity Image, Celebrity Influence, and Celebrity Liability
A celebrity is an individual who represents symbolic icons popular in a culture and transfers his or her symbolic meaning to the product endorsements and services offered by a person with celebrity goodwill. A person with celebrity goodwill casts images that influence product images when the celebrity is associated with the product through product endorsements.
Likewise, a person with celebrity goodwill has been known both to possess the ability and to communicate distinctive bundles of various meanings or images, kinds of images or meanings. However, the root cause for the underlying causal effect of celebrity is unknown. A liability can be attributed to celebrity status to specific identifiable tangible assets or items of intellectual property. Celebrity liability takes the form of intrusion into personal affairs from publicity. For example, celebrity liability might occur if a celebrity director dines at a restaurant with his or her family and is overheard making comments about leadership problems at the company where he or she holds a board position.
Clearly defined in U.S. business law, a board is a corporation’s ultimate authority. A director is an officer with significant influence in the company’s governance decision-making and who is charged with impeccable credentials as an agent on behalf of the shareholders.

== Leadership ==
A person’s leadership skills associated with a directorship are essential for holding a governance position at a company. Leadership is the ability to influence, motivate, and enable others to contribute toward the effectiveness of the organizations of which they are members. Leadership and management are both stressful during times of economic downturns yet an opportunity for optimizing operations, and it is not necessary to be in a formal leadership position to exert leadership behavior. A director as leader must (a) involve the right people in the decision, at the right time, in the right way; (b) use a process that keeps people engaged and on track; (c) recognize the power of shared decision-making; and (d) ask a series of key questions to avoid ineffective decision-making.

== Other celebrity board director characteristics ==
Other characteristics of a celebrity board director include ethical, solid business judgement, reliable agent, informed stakeholder, and effective stewardship. First, business ethics is important not only to the overall effectiveness of corporate governance in place at a company but also to the person who holds the director’s position because business ethics reflects the director’s judgment and decision-making abilities. Corporate failures such as Enron’s as well as economic conditions have resulted in increased regulation and legislation. Each member of the board must take his or her position on the board seriously and apply due diligence during the decision-making process. A lack of ethical judgment in the decision-making process can erode the governance and also possibly lead to poor stewardship on behalf of the stakeholder. The virtue ethics model supports corporate governance with the idea of creating the greatest good for the overall stakeholder collective Each board member must demonstrate trustworthiness and virtue as well as act in good faith as an agent on behalf of all company stakeholders.
Second, effective corporate governance ability and legal compliance are intertwined, and each board member must be familiar with the legal consequence of his or her decision-making as part of the company’s governance body. Two primary legal aspects of governance that a director must pay attention are the Sarbanes–Oxley Act and business judgment rule. The Sarbanes-Oxley Act of 2002 addresses financial stewardship concerns by shareholders with a company’s leadership Like the Sarbanes–Oxley Act, the business judgment rule is useful when members of the board come under scrutiny from upset shareholders. The business judgment rule is a good faith effort to obtain information to avoid class-action lawsuits by shareholders.

Third, each member of the board must be familiar with the consequences of not acting in the best interest of the shareholders. Agency theory provides the framework for a board member’s behavior that aligns with effective corporate governance. In agency theory and corporate governance, self-interested directors appropriate value to themselves. The traditional perspective on corporate governance includes agency and stakeholder theories. When a leader is considering what constitutes shareholder value; the leader should also consider that in practice the value proposition might not hold up given the gap between the stakeholder expectation and the realities of fulfilling that expectation(p. 140).
Fourth, the stakeholder theory is as important as agency theory. Each member of the board must be familiar with the consequences of his or her actions given the competing interest of both internal and external stakeholders with interests in the company. Without familiarity of stakeholder theory, the board member is less than prepared to contribute to an effective governance body. With stakeholder theory the existence of a complex bargaining process involves multiple interests. The multiple competing interests can be found at each level of management within a company, starting at the top with the board of directors. A stakeholder board may be less efficient at generating total benefits. The stakeholder theory defines different groups of interest represented by stakeholders where stakeholders have competing interests yet the desire for the same end, which is to receive some type of benefit.

Lastly, stewardship theory is another building block that provides a foundation for an effective governance body. In stewardship theory and corporate governance, directors maximize value for the company where the allocation of the board is by shareholders in agency theory and by managers in stewardship theory. According to stewardship theory applied to corporate governance, a director is an agent on behalf of the stakeholder. The director’s motivation essentially is to do a good job with managing corporate assets as a good steward.

== See also ==
- Alternate director
- Board of directors
- Brand ambassador
- Corporate title
- Director (business)
- Executive director
- Non-executive director
