= Companies (Model Articles) Regulations 2008 =

- Statutory Instrument
- Parliament of the United Kingdom
- Citation: SI 2008/3229

Dates
- Made: 16 December 2008
- Laid before Parliament: 17 December 2008
- Commencement: 1 October 2009
Other legislation
Made under	Companies Act 2006

Text of statute as originally enacted

Text of the Companies (Model Articles) Regulations 2008 as in force today (including any amendments) within the United Kingdom, from legislation.gov.uk.

The Companies (Model Articles) Regulations 2008 (SI 2008/3229) are the default company constitution for limited companies under UK company law. The Model Articles will apply to a limited company if it does not register its own articles or, if it does register them, they will apply to the extent that they are not modified by the Articles of the company.

The new Model Articles came into force on 1 October 2009 and replaced the old Companies Act 1985 Table A Articles. There are no Model Articles for unlimited companies as these types of companies are relatively rare and often have very specific needs that do not justify a standardised approach. The Model Articles do not affect companies incorporated prior to 1 October 2009 unless they choose to adopt them.

== Private companies ==
Schedule 1 contains the model articles for companies limited by shares. Schedule 2 contains model articles for companies limited by guarantee (which are often non-profit).

The model articles for private companies were drafted primarily for small companies. This means that they tend to be more accessible to the directors and members but they are often not appropriate for companies with multiple shareholders and/or directors that want more detailed constitutional rules.

There are two other sets of model articles of association prescribed by statute for private companies in England, the Right to Manage (Model Articles) England Regulations 2009 for Right to Manage companies, and the Commonhold (Amendment) Regulations 2009 for Commonhold Associations.

== Public companies ==
Schedule 3 contains a more comprehensive set of provisions exist for the model public company articles, reflecting the generally more complex nature of a public company, and extra requirements such as provisions on accounts and the company secretary.

== See also ==
- Corporate law
- UK company law
- Articles of association
