= Articles of organization =

Foundational document of a limited liability company (LLC) in U.S. law

The articles of organization are a document similar to the articles of incorporation, outlining the initial statements required to form a limited liability company (LLC) in many U.S. states. Some states refer to articles of organization as a certificate of organization or a certificate of formation. Once filed and approved by the Secretary of State, or other company registrar, the articles of organization legally create the LLC as a registered business entity within the state.

For terms of similar meaning in other countries, see Articles of association.

== United States ==
The articles of organization outline the governance of an LLC along with the operating agreement and the corporate statutes in the state where articles of organization are filed.

The articles of organization document typically includes the name of the LLC, the type of legal structure (e.g. limited liability company, professional limited liability company, series LLC), the registered agent, whether the LLC is managed by members or managers, the effective date, the duration (perpetual by default in most states), and the names and signatures of the organizer(s). It is the Articles of Organization that establishes the power, rights, liabilities, duties, and other important obligations of LLC members. This document also establishes the obligations between LLC members.

Most secretaries of state provide fill-in-the-blank PDF templates to file with the state. Some people use the services of an attorney to draft articles of organization. Articles must be drafted to meet the state requirements to form a LLC.

The state fee to file articles of organization to form a traditional LLC range from $40 to $500.

Regardless of what the Articles promulgate, the LLC is bound by the specific state laws that it is formed under. A common misconception is that LLCs formed by improper articles of organization do not have the limitation of liability protection allowed by the state. If the state statute allows for limitation of the members' and managers' liability, the said members and managers are covered under that protection regardless of what articles of organization state.

== See also ==
- Articles of association
- Operating agreement
- Registered agent
