= Limited liability company =

US form of a private limited company

A limited liability company (LLC) is a United States-specific form of a private limited company. It is a business structure that can combine the pass-through taxation of a partnership or sole proprietorship with the limited liability of a corporation. An LLC is not a corporation under the laws of every state; it is a legal form of a company that provides limited liability to its owners in many jurisdictions. LLCs are known for the flexibility that they provide to business owners. Depending on the situation, an LLC may elect to use corporate tax rules instead of being treated as a partnership, and under certain circumstances, LLCs may be organized as not-for-profit. In certain U.S. states (for example, Texas), businesses that provide professional services requiring a state professional license, such as legal or medical services, may not be allowed to form an LLC but may be required to form a similar entity called a professional limited liability company (PLLC).

An LLC is a hybrid legal entity with characteristics of both a corporation and a partnership or sole proprietorship (depending on how many owners there are). An LLC is a type of unincorporated association, distinct from a corporation. The primary characteristic an LLC shares with a corporation is limited liability, and the primary characteristic it shares with a partnership is the availability of pass-through income taxation. As a business entity, an LLC is often more flexible than a corporation and may be well-suited for companies with a single owner.

Although LLCs and corporations possess analogous features, the basic terminology used within the United States is different. When an LLC is formed, it is organized rather than incorporated, and its founding document is known as the articles of organization instead of the articles of incorporation. Internal operations of an LLC are governed by its operating agreement. An owner of an LLC is called a member rather than a shareholder. Additionally, ownership is represented by a membership interest (measured in units or percentages) rather than shares of stock. Similarly, a physical document evidencing ownership rights is called a membership certificate rather than a stock certificate.

== History ==
The first state to enact a law authorizing the creation of limited liability companies was Wyoming in 1977. The law was a project of the Hamilton Brothers Oil Company, which sought to organize its business in the United States with liability and tax advantages similar to those it had obtained in Panama.

From 1960 to 1997, the classification of unincorporated business associations for the purpose of U.S. federal income tax law was governed by the Kintner regulations, which were named after the prevailing taxpayer in the 1954 legal precedent of United States v. Kintner. As promulgated by the Internal Revenue Service (IRS) in 1960, the Kintner regulations set forth a complex six-factor test for determining whether such business associations would be taxed as corporations or partnerships. Some of these factors had equal significance, so that the presence of only half of them would result in classification as a partnership. Accordingly, the Wyoming Legislature tailored its statute to grant LLCs particular corporate features without exceeding this threshold.

For several years, other states were slow to adopt the LLC form because it was unclear how the IRS and courts would apply the Kintner regulations to it. After the IRS finally decided in 1988 in Revenue Ruling 88-76 that Wyoming LLCs were taxable as partnerships, other states began to take the LLC seriously and enacted their own LLC statutes. By 1996, all 50 states and the District of Columbia had LLC statutes. In 1995, the IRS came to the conclusion that the widespread enactment of LLC statutes had undermined the Kintner regulations, and in 1996 it promulgated new regulations establishing a so-called check the box (CTB) entity classification election system that went into effect throughout the United States on January 1, 1997.

== Flexibility and default rules ==
LLCs are subject to fewer regulations than traditional corporations, and thus may allow members to create a more flexible management structure than is possible with other corporate forms. As long as the LLC remains within the confines of state law, the operating agreement is responsible for the flexibility the members of the LLC have in deciding how their LLC will be governed. State statutes typically provide automatic or default rules for how an LLC will be governed unless the operating agreement provides otherwise, as permitted by statute in the state where the LLC was organized.

The limited liability company has grown to become one of the most prevalent business forms in the United States. Members of an LLC may include individuals, partnerships, trusts, estates, organizations, or other business entities, and most states do not limit the type or number of members. Even the use of a single member LLC affords greater protection for the assets of the member, as compared to operating as an unincorporated entity.

Effective August 1, 2013, the Delaware Limited Liability Company Act provides that the managers and controlling members of a Delaware-domiciled limited liability company owe fiduciary duties of care and loyalty to the limited liability company and its members. Under the amendment (prompted by the Delaware Supreme Court's decision in Gatz Properties, LLC v. Auriga Capital Corp), parties to an LLC remain free to expand, restrict, or eliminate fiduciary duties in their LLC agreements (subject to the implied covenant of good faith and fair dealing).

Under 6 Del. C. Section 18-101(7), a Delaware LLC operating agreement can be written, oral or implied. It sets forth member capital contributions, ownership percentages, and management structure. Like a prenuptial agreement, an operating agreement can avoid future disputes between members by addressing buy-out rights, valuation formulas, and transfer restrictions. The written LLC operating agreement should be signed by all of its members.

Like a corporation, LLCs are required to register in the states they are conducting (or transacting) business. Each state has different standards and rules defining what transacting business means, and as a consequence, navigating what is required can be quite confusing for small business owners. Simply forming an LLC in any state may not be enough to meet legal requirements, and specifically, if an LLC is formed in one state, but the owner (or owners) are located in another state (or states), or an employee is located in another state, or the LLC's base of operations is located in another state, the LLC may need to register as a foreign LLC in the other states it is transacting business.

LLCs in most states are treated as entities separate from their members. However, in some jurisdictions such as Connecticut, case law has determined that owners were not required to plead facts sufficient to pierce the corporate veil and LLC members can be personally liable for operation of the LLC (see, for example, the case of Sturm v. Harb Development).

== Limited liability ==
The limited liability of an LLC shields owners in that liability for the company's actions does not automatically pass through to them. This is because the company and the owner are legally separate entities that are not responsible for each other's obligations.

In the absence of express statutory guidance, most American courts have held that LLC members are subject to the same common law alter ego piercing theories as corporate shareholders. However, it is more difficult to pierce the LLC veil because LLCs do not have many formalities to maintain. As long as the LLC and the members do not commingle funds, it is difficult to pierce the LLC veil. Membership interests in LLCs and partnership interests are also afforded a significant level of protection through the charging order mechanism. The charging order limits the creditor of a debtor-partner or a debtor-member to the debtor's share of distributions, without conferring on the creditor any voting or management rights.

Limited liability company members may, in certain circumstances, also incur a personal liability in cases where distributions to members render the LLC insolvent.

== Tax ==
For U.S. federal income tax purposes, an LLC is treated by default as a pass-through entity. If there is only one member in the company, the LLC is treated as a disregarded entity for tax purposes, unless another tax status is elected, and an individual owner reports the LLC's income or loss on Schedule C of their individual tax return. Thus, income from the LLC is taxed at individual tax rates. The default tax status for LLCs with multiple members is a partnership, which is required to report income and loss on IRS Form 1065. Under partnership tax treatment, as is the case for all partners of a partnership, each member of the LLC annually receives a Schedule K-1 reporting the member's distributive share of the LLC's income or loss, which is then reported on the member's individual income tax return. On the other hand, income from corporations is taxed twice: once at the corporate entity level and again when distributed to shareholders. Thus, greater tax savings often result if a business is formed as an LLC rather than a corporation.

An LLC with either single or multiple members may elect to be taxed as a corporation through the filing of IRS Form 8832. After electing corporate tax status, an LLC may further elect to be treated as a regular C corporation (taxation of the entity's income prior to any dividends or distributions to the members, and then taxation of the dividends or distributions once received as income by the members) or as an S corporation (entity-level income and loss passes through to the members). Some commentators have recommended an LLC taxed as an S corporation as the best possible small business structure. It combines the simplicity and flexibility of an LLC with the tax benefits of an S corporation (self-employment tax savings).

Some legal scholars argue that corporate income taxes are intended to limit the power of corporations and to offset the legal benefits corporations enjoy, such as limited liability for their investors. There is concern that LLCs, by combining limited liability with no entity-level taxation, could contribute to excessive risk-taking and harm to third parties.

Taxing jurisdictions outside the US are likely to treat a US LLC as a corporation, regardless of its treatment for US tax purposes—for example a US LLC doing business outside the US or as a resident of a foreign jurisdiction.

== Variations ==
A professional limited liability company (usually shortened as PLLC, P.L.L.C., or P.L., and sometimes PLC, standing for professional limited company – not to be confused with public limited company) is a LLC organized for the purpose of providing professional services. Usually, professions where the state requires a license to provide services, such as a doctor, chiropractor, lawyer, accountant, architect, landscape architect, or engineer, require the formation of a PLLC. However, some states, such as California, do not permit LLCs to engage in the practice of a licensed profession. Exact requirements of PLLCs vary from state to state. Typically, a PLLC's members must all be professionals practicing the same profession. In addition, the limitation of personal liability of members does not extend to professional malpractice claims.

A series LLC is a special form of a limited liability company that allows a single LLC to segregate its assets into separate series. For example, a series LLC that purchases separate pieces of real estate may put each in a separate series so if the lender forecloses on one piece of property, the others are not affected.

For some business ventures, such as real estate investment, each property can be owned by a separate LLC, thereby shielding the owners and their other properties from cross-liability.

An L3C is a for-profit, social enterprise venture that has a stated goal of performing a socially beneficial purpose, not maximizing income. It is a hybrid structure that combines the legal and tax flexibility of a traditional LLC, the social benefits of a nonprofit organization, and the branding and market positioning advantages of a social enterprise.

An anonymous limited liability company is an LLC for which ownership information is not made publicly available by the state. Anonymity is possible in states that do not require the public disclosure of legal ownership of an LLC, or where an LLC's identified legal owners are another anonymous company.

== See also ==
- Besloten vennootschap, a Belgian and Dutch private limited company
- Société à responsabilité limitée, the equivalent in French-speaking countries
- Gesellschaft mit beschränkter Haftung (German equivalent)
- Sociedad de responsabilidad limitada the equivalent in Spanish-speaking countries
- Incorporation (business)
- Limited liability partnership (LLP)
- List of official business registers
- List of legal entity types by country
- Private company limited by shares
- Unlimited company
- Wholly Foreign-Owned Enterprise
- Foreign LLC
- Società a responsabilità limitata similar Italian form
