= Memorandum of conversation =

Example: Memorandum of conversation of meeting led by Brent Scowcroft (1976)

Memorandum of conversation (abbrev.: MEMCON) and also memorandum of a conversation and memo to the file refers to a method of contemporaneous documentation of a conversation in the form of a memorandum used by the United States federal government.

The Weekly Standard characterized the use of the tactic in the U.S. government as among "the most basic ways of Washington".

== Method ==
Typically an individual will document the events of the conversation as soon as possible after the occurrence. All material statements and discussed items are quoted and described as accurately as possible soon after the discussion and filed for future reference. Memcons function as documentation of historical events, such as conversations between heads of state and law enforcement officials. Specific developments discussed, the time of the meeting, location, and individuals in attendance are all documented in-depth within the memo.

United States Department of Justice attorneys and Federal Bureau of Investigation special agents commonly make use of memoranda of conversation. A majority of intermediate-rank managerial staff and bureaucrats within the U.S. federal government consistently make use of the method. The creation of a memorandum of understanding allows federal employees to memorialize and keep a record of their conversations and transactions.

Memoranda to file are used in investigations in the private sector. For example, the fraud unit of a large corporation may use memoranda to file, to report individual interviews and significant telephone conversations. Generally, "the memorandum will show the name of the author, date of preparation, the case name or number, and the specific subject covered. It will also contain the detailed narrative of the event, interview, or other investigative activity described and should be written as close in time as circumstances permit to those events."

== History ==
Former Deputy Assistant to the President for National Security Affairs and subsequently Assistant to the President for National Security Affairs, Brent Scowcroft, who served as such in the U.S. presidential administration of Gerald R. Ford, kept copious documentation of his meetings in the form of memorandum of conversation. He would take handwritten notes, and immediately have them transcribed in typewritten format with the assistance of his staff from the United States National Security Council. The Gerald R. Ford Presidential Library and Museum contains over 1,000 such memorandum of conversation documents relating to the Presidency of Richard Nixon and Presidency of Gerald Ford, mainly related to national security of the United States.

== See also ==
- Bench memorandum
- Business records exception
- Good documentation practice
- Grey literature
- Memorandum of agreement
- Memorandum of association
- Memorandum of understanding
- Mémoire
- Presidential memorandum
- Private Placement Memorandum
