= Articles of association =

Constitution of a corporation

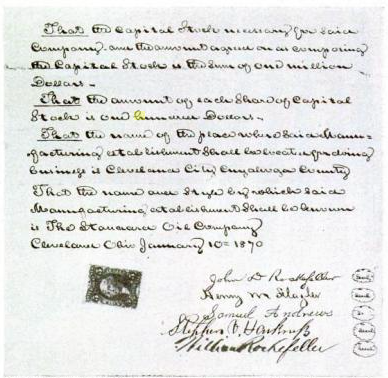
The 1870 articles of incorporation for the Standard Oil Company

In corporate governance, a company's articles of association (AoA, called articles of incorporation in some jurisdictions) is a document that, along with the memorandum of association (where applicable), forms the company's constitution. The articles define the responsibilities of the directors, the nature of business, and the mechanisms by which shareholders exert control over the board of directors.

Articles of association are essential to corporate operations, as they may regulate both internal and external affairs.

Articles of incorporation, also referred to as the certificate of incorporation or the corporate charter, is a document or charter that establishes the existence of a corporation in the United States and Canada. They generally are filed with the Secretary of State in the U.S. State where the company is incorporated, or other company registrar. An equivalent term for limited liability companies (LLCs) in the United States is articles of organization.

== Contents ==
The articles can cover a medley of topics, not all of which may be required under a country's law. Although all terms are not discussed, they may cover:

- The issuing of shares (also called stock) and the classes of shares, such as preferred stock and common stock
- The dividend policy and the transferability of shares
- Valuation of intellectual rights
- How the day-to-day operations of the company are conducted, such as by a board of directors.
- The appointments of directors, which shows whether a shareholder dominates or shares equality with all of the contributors
- Special voting rights of the chairperson and their mode of election
- Directors meetings, including the quorum number and the percentage of vote needed to pass a motion
- Confidentiality and the founders' agreement with penalties for disclosure
- First right of refusal for purchase rights and counter-bids by a founder.
- Drag-along provisions, or when the majority shareholders force a sale on the other shareholders.
- Determinations for the price paid for shares transferred following cessation of directorship or employment.

Companies' articles may include an arbitration clause, for example under Swiss company law. In the UK, the Association of British Insurers and the National Association of Pension Funds have both argued for restricted use of arbitration clauses in articles of association unless clear benefits and shareholder consent can both be evidenced.

== Directors ==
A company is run by the directors, who are appointed by the shareholders. Usually, the shareholders elect a board of directors (BOD) at the annual general meeting (AGM), which may be statutory (e.g. India and the UK).

The number of directors depends on the size of the company and statutory requirements. The chairperson is generally a well-known outsider but they may be a working executive of the company, typically of an American company. The directors may, or may not, be employees of the company.

== Shareholders ==
In present countries there are usually a few major shareholders who come together to form the company. Each usually holds the right to nominate, without objection of the other, a certain number of directors who become nominees for the election by the shareholder body at the AGM. Shareholders may also elect independent directors (from the public). The chair would be a person not associated with the promoters of the company, a person is generally a well-known outsider. Once elected, the BOD manages the company. The shareholders play no part until the next AGM/EGM.

== Memorandum of association ==
The objectives and the purpose of the company are determined in advance by the shareholders and the memorandum of association (MOA), if separate, which denotes the name of the company, its head-office, street address, and (founding) directors and the main purposes of the company for public access. It cannot be changed except at an AGM or extraordinary general meeting (EGM) and statutory allowance. The MOA is generally filed with a registrar of companies who is an appointee of the government of the country. For their assurance, the shareholders are permit of the memorandum of association. Any matter in the articles of association not within the scope of the memorandum of association of the company is void (ultra vires).

== Board meetings ==
The board meets several times each year. At each meeting there is an 'agenda' before it. A minimum number of directors (a quorum) is required to meet. This is either determined by the by-laws or is a statutory requirement. It is presided over by the chairperson (chair), or in their absence, by the vice-chair. The directors survey their area of responsibility. They may determine to make a 'resolution' at the next AGM or if it is an urgent matter, at an EGM. The directors who are the electives of one major shareholder, may present their view but this is not necessarily so – they may have to view the objectives of the company and competitive position. The chair may have to break the vote if there is a tie. At the AGM, the various resolutions are put to vote.

== Annual general meeting ==
The AGM is called with a notice sent to all shareholders with a clear interval. A certain quorum of shareholders is required to meet. If the quorum requirement is not met, it is cancelled and another meeting called. If it at that too a quorum is not met, a third meeting may be called and the members present, unlimited by the quorum, take all decisions. There are variations to this among companies and countries.

Decisions are taken by a show of hands; the chair is always present. Where decisions are made by a show of hands is challenged, it is met by a count of votes. Voting can be taken in person or by marking the paper sent by the company. A person who is not a shareholder of the company can vote if they have a 'proxy', an authorization from the shareholder. Each share carries the number of votes attached to it. Some votes may be for the decision, others not.

== Resolutions ==
There are two types of resolutions, known as an ordinary resolution and a special resolution.

A special resolution can be tabled at a director's meeting. The ordinary resolution requires the endorsement by a majority vote, sometimes easily met by partners' vote. The special resolution requires a 60, 70 or 80% of the vote as stipulated by the constitution of the company. Shareholders other than partners may vote. The matters which require the ordinary and special resolution to be passed are enumerated in company or corporate law. Special resolutions covering some topics may be a statutory requirement.

== Various countries ==
The articles of association of a company, or articles of incorporation, of an American or Canadian company, are often simply referred to as articles (and are often capitalized as an abbreviation for the full term). The Articles are a requirement for the establishment of a company under the law of India, the United Kingdom, Nigeria, Pakistan and many other countries. In 1955, Together with the memorandum of association, they are the constitution of a company. The equivalent term for an LLC is articles of organization. Roughly equivalent terms operate in other countries, such as Gesellschaftsvertrag in Germany, statuts in France, statut in Poland, Ukrainian: статут (Romanization: statut) in Ukraine, and Jeong-gwan in South Korea.

In South Africa, from the new Companies Act 2008 which commenced in 2011, articles and memoranda of association have been replaced by a "memorandum of incorporation" or "MoI". The MoI gives considerably more scope to vary how to the company is governed than the previous arrangement.

=== Canada ===
Articles of Incorporation are appended to a Certificate of Incorporation and become the legal document that governs the corporation. In Canada, the process of incorporation can be done either at the federal or provincial level. Companies which incorporate with the federal government will generally need to register extra-provincially in the province that they elect to do business. Similarly, a provincial corporation may need to register extra-provincially if they are to have offices outside of their home province. Incorporated Canadian companies can generally use either Corp., Corporation, Inc., Incorporated, Incorporée, Limited, Limitée, Ltd., Ltée, Société par actions de régime fédéral, S.A.R.F, in their name, but this may vary from province to province.

The following information is required upon filing Articles of Incorporation in Canada:

- Name of Business (Numbered and Named)
- Head Office
- Names and Residencies of Incorporators
- Proof of Canadian Citizenship
- Corporate Share Structure
- Anticipated Business Restrictions

=== United Kingdom ===
==== Model articles of associations (A.O.A.) ====
In the United Kingdom, model articles of association, known as Table A have been published since 1865. The articles of association of most companies incorporated prior to 1 October 2009 – particularly small companies – are Table A, or closely derived from it. However, a company is free to incorporate under different articles of association, or to amend its articles of association at any time by a special resolution of its shareholders, provided that they meet the requirements and restrictions of the Companies Acts. Such requirements tend to be more onerous for public companies than for private ones. In Hong Kong, the Companies Registry provides four samples of model Articles of Association, and they are known as Sample A, B, C, and D respectively. Sample A and B are both designed for a private company (the most common company type), Sample C for a public company, and Sample D for a company limited by guarantee.

==== Companies Act 2006 ====
The Companies Act 2006 received royal assent on 8 November 2006 and was fully implemented on 1 October 2009. It provides a new form of Model Articles for companies incorporated in the United Kingdom. Under the new legislation, the articles of association will become the single constitutional document for a UK company, and will subsume the majority of the role previously filled by the separate memorandum of association.

The use of model articles for companies is not compulsory. If custom articles of associations are not registered, the relevant model articles apply by default from incorporation.

=== United States ===
==== History of corporations in the United States ====
After fighting the American Revolution with Great Britain, the founders of the United States had a healthy fear of corporations after being exploited for years by those in England. As a result, they limited the role of corporations by only granting select corporate charters, mainly to those that were beneficial to society as a whole. For the better part of the first one hundred years of United States history, the power of corporations was severely limited as owners could not own any stock or property, make financial donations to a political party, and legislators could dissolve a corporation at any time relatively easily. Corporations did not have the same corporate veil of protection that are enjoyed today.

The shift towards corporations gaining more power and control happened as the United States progressed towards industrialization. The American Civil War wildly enriched corporations and with this new wealth came bribes to legislators and courts that allowed for increased liability protection and other corporate protections. The 1886 Supreme Court case Santa Clara County v. Southern Pacific Railroad set the important legal precedent that corporations were “natural people” and as a result were protected under the 14th Amendment.

==== General information ====
The articles of incorporation outline the governance of a corporation along with the corporate bylaws and the corporate statutes in the state where articles of incorporation are filed. To amend a corporate charter, the amendment must usually be approved by the company's board of directors and voted on by the company's shareholders.

The articles of incorporation typically include the name of the corporation, the type of corporate structure (e.g. profit corporation, nonprofit corporation, benefit corporation, professional corporation), the registered agent, the number of authorized shares, the effective date, the duration (perpetual by default), and the names and signatures of the incorporators.

The state fee to file articles of incorporation to incorporate a profit corporation range from $50 - $300, and to incorporate a nonprofit corporation range from $0 -$125.

==== How to file ====
The first step in filing articles of incorporation is for the owners to decide which state to incorporate the business in. Once the state has been chosen, the documents with all the corporation's information have to be filled out, whether physically or virtually. Once completed, these documents will be reviewed by the secretary of state's office, and upon approval from the state government and payment of a filing fee, the company has officially become a legal corporation.

The following information is required upon filing Articles of Incorporation in the United States:

- Name of the Business
- Location of Business
- Whether or not the corporation is for profit
- Names and Addresses of Incorporators
- Names and Address of who will receive mail and where
- Names and Addresses of Officers
- A statement that summarizes the core purpose of the business
- The number of authorized shares of stock
- Other information may be required upon filing but this varies from state to state

==== Where to file ====
Many corporations file in the state in which they are doing business, although this is not required by law. Corporations doing business in multiple states often file articles in the particular state that is the most lenient on corporations. A majority of public corporations in the United States file in Delaware or Nevada, although Wyoming is a popular choice as well.

- Delaware: Over 60% of Fortune 500 companies and 75% of new corporations every year are incorporated in the state of Delaware due to the state's favorable corporate treatment. The state's unique court, the Court of Chancery, allows corporate disputes to be heard without a jury within a reasonable time compared to non-corporate disputes. State corporate laws are very modern and specifically detail what a corporation is allowed to do, and as a result other states often try to emulate Delaware's legal corporate model. There is even further protection for corporations via the Delaware Asset Protection Trust in which personal assets are protected in the event of litigation. In order to abide by securities laws, some companies are even required to incorporate in Delaware.
- Nevada: Despite having the highest registration fee in the United States and a negative stigma, Nevada is a very popular state for incorporation. The main reason for this is that the corporation does not have to pay any of the numerous state taxes. Similar to Delaware, some companies are mandated to incorporate in the state in order to be in compliance with securities law. Filing in Nevada also affords the corporate owners privacy as the state does not require names to do so. Unlike many other states, the corporation does not have to do business nor do any of the owners have to be a resident in the state to incorporate there.
- Wyoming: The standard filing fees owed in the process of incorporating are zero in Wyoming, and the only fee owed is minimal compared to other states. Other favorable corporate laws include asset protection for owners as well as confidential information protection through requiring the usage of private data servers. Being a United States citizen is not a prerequisite for incorporating in the state, although there are countries of origin where businesses are ineligible. The state is one of the best in terms of fiscal health, and as a result corporation owners do not have to file personal income taxes.

== See also ==
- Articles of organization
- Bylaws
- Certificate of incorporation
- Charter
- Collegium
- Congressional charter
- Government-sponsored enterprise
- List of company registers
- Mission statement
- Operating agreement
- Outline of management
- Royal charter
- Companies (Model Articles) Regulations 2008
