= Operating agreement =

Legal document

An operating agreement is a key document used by limited liability companies (LLCs) to outline the business' financial and functional decisions including rules, regulations and provisions. The purpose of the document is to govern the internal operations of the business in a way that suits the specific needs of the business owners, called "members". Once the document is signed by the members of the limited liability company, it acts as an official contract binding them to its terms. An operating agreement is mandatory as per laws in only 3 states: California, Missouri, and New York. LLCs operating without an operating agreement are governed by the state's default rules contained in the relevant statute and developed through state court decisions. An operating agreement is similar in function to corporate by-laws, or analogous to a partnership agreement in multi-member LLCs. In single-member LLC, an operating agreement is a declaration of the structure that the member has chosen for the company and sometimes used to prove in court that the LLC structure is separate from that of the individual owner and thus necessary so that the owner has documentation to prove that they are indeed separate from the entity itself.

Most states do not require operating agreements. However, an operating agreement is highly recommended for multi-member LLCs because it structures an LLC's finances and organization, and provides rules and regulations for smooth operation. The operating agreement usually includes percentage of interests, allocation of profits and losses, member's rights and responsibilities and other provisions.
