= Russell v Northern Bank Development Corp Ltd =

- Court: House of Lords
- Decided: 11 May 1992
- Citations: [1992] 1 WLR 588 [1992] 3 All ER 161

Court membership
- Judges sitting: Lord Griffiths; Lord Jauncey; Lord Lowry; Lord Mustill; Lord Slynn

Case opinions
- Decision by: Lord Jauncey
- Concurrence: Lord Griffiths, Lord Lowry, Lord Mustill and Lord Slynn

Keywords
- Shareholders' agreement; Company powers

Russell v Northern Bank Development Corp Ltd [1992] 1 WLR 588 is a leading case on shareholders' rights in the United Kingdom in which the House of Lords held that a private shareholders' agreement could not fetter a company's statutory powers but could bind the voting rights of those parties to the agreement.

== Facts ==
Four executives of a brick works in Dungannon, County Tyrone were shareholders, with 20 shares each, in a company called Tyrone Brick Limited (T.B.L) alongside Northern Bank Development Corporation, which held 120 shares. Eight hundred other shares were not allotted.

All executives, Northern Bank, and the company T.B.L itself, were parties to a shareholders' agreement with a clause that stated, "No further share capital shall be created or issued in the company or the rights attaching to the shares already in issue in any way altered (save as herein set out) or any share transfer of the existing shares permitted, save in the following manner, without the written consent of each of the parties hereto."

In March 1988 the board of T.B.L issued a notice to shareholders of an extraordinary general meeting to consider a resolution allowing for a 3,999,000 new shares to be issued by the company. One of the executives, Samuel Russell, sought an injunction restraining the other executives and Northern Bank from considering or voting on the resolution and damages for breach of contract.

At trial the judge held that the shareholder's agreement was invalidated because it sought to fetter T.B.L's statutory power to increase its capital. The Court of Appeal, by a majority, upheld this decision. Russell appealed, although now claiming only a declaration as to his rights and not also an injunction.

== Judgment ==
The House of Lords upheld the appeal. Lord Jauncey stated,

My Lords while a provision in a company's articles which restricts its statutory power to alter those articles is invalid an agreement dehors the articles between shareholders as to how they shall exercise their voting rights on a resolution is not necessarily so.

— Lord Jauncey, Russell v Northern Bank Development Corp Ltd'

The House of Lords thus held that while the agreement could bind the shareholders it could not bind the company itself;

This was a clear undertaking by T.B.L. in a formal agreement not to exercise its statutory powers for a period which could, certainly on one view of construction, last for as long as one of the parties remained a shareholder. [...] As such an undertaking it is, in my view, as obnoxious as if it had been in the articles of association and therefore is unenforceable as being contrary to the provisions of article 131 of the Companies (Northern Ireland) Order 1986. T.B.L.'s undertaking is, however, independent of and severable from that of the shareholders and there is no reason why the latter should not be enforceable by the shareholders inter se as a personal agreement which in no way fetters T.B.L. in the exercise of its statutory powers.

— Lord Jauncey, Russell v Northern Bank Development Corp Ltd'

== Significance ==
Professor Eilís Ferran, writing in the Cambridge Law Journal noted that regarding the question of companies contracting out of statutory powers, "The decision in Russell provides a firm and unequivocal answer to the question: there can be no contracting out by a company in respect of its statutory powers." Ferran criticised the decision for making a "technical distinction which is not immediately obvious and which rests on the turning of a blind eye to the manifest practical consequences which can flow from a voting agreement."

== See also ==
- Shareholders in the United Kingdom
