= Companies Act 1985 =

Act of the Parliament of the United Kingdom

Companies Act 1985 (Note: Section 747)
- Act of Parliament
- Parliament of the United Kingdom
- Long title: An Act to consolidate the greater part of the Companies Acts
- Citation: 1985 c. 6
- Territorial extent: England and Wales; Scotland; (Note: Section 745(2).)

Dates
- Royal assent: 11 March 1985
- Commencement: 1 July 1985 (Note: Section 746.)
Other legislation
| Amends | Foreign Jurisdiction Act 1890 |
| Amended by | Bankruptcy (Scotland) Act 1985; Insolvency Act 1986; Company Directors Disqualification Act 1986; Court of Session Act 1988; Law Reform (Miscellaneous Provisions) (Scotland) Act 1990; Age of Legal Capacity (Scotland) Act 1991; Criminal Justice Act 1993; Statute Law (Repeals) Act 1993; Coal Industry Act 1994; Registration of Political Parties Act 1998; Youth Justice and Criminal Evidence Act 1999; Limited Liability Partnerships Act 2000; Abolition of Feudal Tenure etc. (Scotland) Act 2000; Criminal Justice and Police Act 2001; Statute Law (Repeals) Act 2004; Companies Act 2006; Digital Markets, Competition and Consumers Act 2024; Employment Rights Act 2025 |

Status: Amended

Text of statute as originally enacted

Revised text of statute as amended

Text of the Companies Act 1985 as in force today (including any amendments) within the United Kingdom, from legislation.gov.uk.

The Companies Act 1985 (c. 6) is an act of the Parliament of the United Kingdom, enacted in 1985, which enabled companies to be formed by registration, and set out the responsibilities of companies, their directors and secretaries. It has largely been superseded by the Companies Act 2006.

The act was a consolidation of various other pieces of company legislation, and was one component of the rules governing companies in England and Wales and in Scotland. A company will also be governed by its own memorandum and articles of association.

Table A, which lays out default articles of association, was not included in the body of the act, as it had been in all previous Companies Acts. Instead, it was introduced by statutory instrument - the Companies (Tables A to F) Regulations 1985.

The act applied only to companies incorporated under it, or under earlier Companies Acts. Sole traders, partnerships, limited liability partnerships etc. were not governed by the act.

Company law throughout the United Kingdom is now governed by the Companies Act 2006, which received Royal Assent on 8 November 2006, and which was commenced in stages between then and 1 October 2009.

Certain aspects of the Companies Act 1985 have not been replaced by the Companies Act 2006, and they will remain in force:

- company investigations
- orders imposing restrictions on shares following an investigation
- Scottish floating charges and receivers.

== See also ==
- Companies Act
