= Memorandum of association =

Corporate document

The memorandum of association of a company is an important corporate document in certain jurisdictions. It is often simply referred to as the memorandum. In the UK, it has to be filed with the Registrar of Companies during the process of incorporation of a company. It is the document that regulates the company's external affairs, and complements the articles of association which cover the company's internal constitution. It contains the fundamental conditions under which the company is allowed to operate. Until recent it had to include the "object clause" which made the shareholders, creditors and those dealing with the company know what is its permitted range of operation, although this was usually drafted very broadly. It also shows the company's initial capital. It is one of the documents required to incorporate a company in India, the United Kingdom, Ireland, Canada, Nigeria, Nepal, Bangladesh, Pakistan, Afghanistan, Sri Lanka, and Tanzania and is also used in many of the common law jurisdictions of the Commonwealth.

== Requirements: United Kingdom ==
It is still a requirement to file a memorandum of association to incorporate a new company, but it contains less information than was required before 1 October 2010. The Companies (Registration) Regulation 2008 included pro-forma Memorandum.

It is basically a statement that the subscribers wish to form a company under the Companies Act 2006, have agreed to become members and, in the case of a company that is to have a share capital, to take at least one share each. It is no longer required to state the name of the company, the type of company (such as public limited company or private company limited by shares), the location of its registered office, the objects of the company, and its authorized share capital. Instead, these details appear solely in the Articles of Association. Companies incorporated prior to 1 October 2009 are not required to amend their memorandum, and for these companies the provisions which would have appeared in the memorandum but are now required to appear in the Articles, such as the objects clause and details of the share capital, are deemed to form a part of the latter.

== Capacities ==
The memorandum no longer restricts the activities of a company. Since 1 October 2009, if a company's constitution contains any restrictions on the objects at all, those restrictions will form part of the articles of association.

Historically, a company's memorandum of association contained an objects clause, which limited its capacity to act. When the first limited companies were incorporated, the objects clause had to be widely drafted so as not to restrict the board of directors in their day to day trading. In the Companies Act 1989, the term "General Commercial Company" was introduced which meant that companies could undertake "any lawful or legal trade or business".

== See also ==
- Articles of association
- Constitutional documents
- Memorandum of conversation
- Memorandum of understanding
- Table A
