= Companies Act 2006 =

Act of the Parliament of the United Kingdom

Companies Act 2006 (Note: Section 1298.)
- Act of Parliament
- Parliament of the United Kingdom
- Long title: An Act to reform company law and restate the greater part of the enactments relating to companies; to make other provision relating to companies and other forms of business organisation; to make provision about directors' disqualification, business names, auditors and actuaries; to amend Part 9 of the Enterprise Act 2002; and for connected purposes
- Citation: 2006 c. 46
- Territorial extent: United Kingdom (Note: Section 1299.)

Dates
- Royal assent: 8 November 2006
- Commencement: Various (Note: Section 1300.)
Other legislation
Amends	Water Consolidation (Consequential Provisions) Act 1991; Criminal Procedure (Consequential Provisions) (Scotland) Act 1995; Youth Justice and Criminal Evidence Act 1999; Limited Liability Partnerships Act 2000; Political Parties, Elections and Referendums Act 2000; Constitutional Reform Act 2005; Law Reform (Miscellaneous Provisions) (Northern Ireland) Order 2005
Repeals/revokes	Business Names Act 1985
Amended by	Charities Act 2011; Co-operative and Community Benefit Societies Act 2014; Pensions Act 2014; Corporate Insolvency and Governance Act 2020; Sentencing Act 2020; Economic Crime and Corporate Transparency Act 2023; Digital Markets, Competition and Consumers Act 2024

Status: Amended

History of passage through Parliament

Text of statute as originally enacted

Revised text of statute as amended

The Companies Act 2006 (c. 46) is an act of the Parliament of the United Kingdom, whose length 1,300 sections and additional schedules form the primary source of UK company law, including the duties of a company's directors.

== Provisions ==
The act provides a comprehensive code of company law for the United Kingdom, and made changes to almost every facet of the law in relation to companies. Its key provisions were:

- the act codified certain existing common law principles, such as those relating to directors' duties.
- it transposed the European Union's Takeover Directive and Transparency Directive into UK law.
- it introduced various new provisions for private and public companies.
- it applied a single company law regime across the United Kingdom, replacing the two separate (if identical) systems for Great Britain and Northern Ireland.
- it amended or restated almost all of the Companies Act 1985 and the Companies (Audit, Investigations and Community Enterprise) Act 2004 to varying degrees.

The bill for the act was first introduced to Parliament as "the Company Law Reform Bill" and was intended to make wide-ranging amendments to existing statutes. Lobbying from directors and the legal profession ensured that the bill was changed into a consolidating act, avoiding the need for cross-referencing between numerous statutes. The act was brought into force in stages, with the final provision being commenced on 1 October 2009. It largely superseded the Companies Act 1985: ministers suggested that one third of the Act simply restated the Companies Act 1985, one third modified it, and one third was completely new.

It was the single, longest piece of legislation passed by Parliament, totalling 1,300 sections and 16 schedules.

== Implementation ==
A small portion of the act, including section 43 which transposed the EU Transparency Directive into UK law, came into effect on royal assent in November 2006. The first and second Commencement Orders then brought further provisions into force in January 2007 and April 2007. The implementation timetable for the remainder of the Act was announced in February 2007, by Margaret Hodge, Minister for Industry and the Regions. The third and fourth Commencement Orders brought a further tranche of provisions into force in October 2007, and the fifth, sixth and seventh in April and October 2008. The eighth commencement order, made in November 2008, brought the remainder of the Act into force with effect from October 2009.

The staggered timetable was intended to give companies sufficient time to prepare for the new regime under the act, rather than implementing all 1,300 sections of the act on one day.

Another reason for the staggered implementation is that, despite the act's size, a great many sections provide for subsidiary legislation to be brought in by Secretary of State, which required time to draft.

Implementation of the act was the responsibility of the Department for Business, Innovation and Skills.

== Directors ==
The act replaced and codified the principal common law and equitable duties of directors, but it does not purport to provide an exhaustive statement of their duties, and so it is likely that the common law duties survive in a reduced form. Traditional common law notions of corporate benefit have been removed, and the new emphasis is on corporate social responsibility. There are seven statutory duties placed on directors which are as follows:

1. s.171 to act within powers – to abide by the terms of the company's memorandum and articles of association, and decisions made by the shareholders.
2. s.172 to promote the success of the company – "success" is not defined. Directors must continue to act in a way that benefits the shareholders as a whole, but there is now an additional list of non-exhaustive factors to which the directors must have regard. This was one of the most controversial aspects of the new legislation at the drafting stage. These factors are:
  1. the likely long term consequences of decisions;
  2. the interests of employees;
  3. the need to foster the company's business relationships with suppliers, customers, and others;
  4. the impact on the community and the environment;
  5. the desire to maintain a reputation for high standards of business conduct; and
  6. the need to act fairly as between members.
3. s.173 to exercise independent judgment – directors must not fetter their discretion to act, other than pursuant to an agreement entered into by the company or in a way authorised by the company's articles.
4. s.174 to exercise reasonable care, skill, and diligence – this must be exercised to the standard expected of:
  1. someone with the general knowledge, skill, and experience reasonably expected of a person carrying out the functions of the director (the objective test); and also
  2. the actual knowledge, skill, and experience of that particular director (the subjective test).
5. s.175 to avoid conflicts of interest – methods for authorising such conflicts by either board or shareholder approval are also to be introduced.
6. s.176 not to accept benefits from third parties – minor gifts which cannot be reasonably regarded as giving a rise to a conflict of interest may be accepted by the director(s), but this must be looked at contextually (s.176(4)).
7. s.177 to declare an interest in a proposed transaction with the company – there are to be carve outs for matters that are not likely to give rise to a conflict of interest, or of which the directors are already aware. There will be an additional statutory obligations to declare interests in relation to existing transactions.

Although the changes to directors' duties were the most widely publicised (and controversial) feature of the legislation, the Act also affects directors in various other ways:

- s.239 The shareholders' ability to ratify any conduct of a director (including breach of duty, negligence, default or breach of trust) is regulated by the statute, although s.239(7) leaves the door open for common law principles, previously the only guide on this. Under the Act, directors who are also shareholders, or persons connected to them, are not entitled to vote in relation to any ratification resolution concerning their actions; they may, however, attend, be counted towards the quorum, and take part in the proceedings at any meeting at which the decision is considered (s.239(4)).
- Existing restrictions on companies indemnifying directors against certain liabilities were relaxed to permit indemnities by group companies to directors of corporate trustees and occupational pension schemes.
- ss.261–263 gave shareholders a statutory right to pursue claims against the directors for misfeasance on behalf of a company (a derivative action), although the shareholders need the consent of the court to proceed with such a claim.
- Certain transactions between the company and its directors which were previously prohibited by law have become lawful subject to the approval of shareholders (for example, loans from the company to its directors).
- The Act requires at least one director on the board of the company to be a natural person, although corporate directors are still permitted.
- The current age restriction of 70 for directors of public companies has been abolished. A new minimum age of 16 has been introduced for all directors who are natural persons (s.157).
- Directors will have the option of providing Companies House with a service address, which will in future enable their home addresses to be kept on a separate register to which access will be restricted.

== General provisions ==
The Act contains various provisions which affect all companies irrespective of their status:

- Company formation – the procedure for incorporating companies was modernised to facilitate incorporation over the Internet. It is now possible for a single person to form a public company.
- Constitutional documents – a company's articles of association are its main constitutional document, and the company's memorandum is treated as part of its articles. New model articles for private companies to be made under the Act are intended to reflect better the way that small companies operate, and will replace the existing Table A. Existing companies will be permitted to adopt the new model articles in whole or in part.
- Corporate capacity – under the new Act a company's capacity is unlimited unless its articles specifically provide otherwise, thus greatly reducing the applicability of the ultra vires doctrine to corporate law and removing the need for an excessively long objects clause in the memorandum of association.
- Execution of documents – Formalities for execution as a deed are further revised, so that a single director can execute a document as a deed on behalf of the company by a simple signature in the presence of a witness.
- Share capital – the requirement for an authorised share capital is abolished. Companies can redenominate their share capital from one currency to another without an order of the court.
- Distributions in kind – The Act addresses the previous uncertainty in the law in relation to the transfer of non-cash assets by a company to a shareholder, and whether this should be treated as a distribution. (Note: Briefly, if the company concerned has distributable profits, then (a) there will be no distribution if the consideration for the asset exceeds its book value, or (b) if the consideration for the asset is less than the book value of the asset, then there will be a distribution of the amount equivalent to the difference.)
- Shareholder meetings – The Act enables shareholder meetings to be held more quickly. Special resolutions now require only 14 days' notice unless proposed at an annual general meeting (AGM).
- Shareholder communications – The Act made it easier for companies to communicate electronically (e.g. by email or by website) with their shareholders by express agreement (which agreement can be obtained under the articles, or by the shareholder failing to indicate that they do not wish to communicate via the website, as well as by more conventional methods).
- Auditor's liability – auditors are now permitted to limit their liability for claims in negligence, breach of trust or breach of duty so long as:
  - the shareholders have approved the limitation in advance.
  - the court considers the limitation of liability to be "fair and reasonable".

This change was made after intensive lobbying by the accounting profession in the United Kingdom.

- Company Names Adjudicator – Section 69 of the Act provides for the appointment of a Company Names Adjudicator. A Company Names Tribunal was established on 1 October 2008 through which the Company Names Adjudicator will administer his powers via the UK Intellectual Property Office under the tribunal. Section 69 expanded the grounds under which any person can object to a conflicting company name registration under the Act.

== Private companies ==
One of the more touted aspects of the new legislation was the simplification of the corporate regime for small privately held companies. A number of the changes brought about by the Act apply only to private companies. Significant changes include:

- Company secretaries – a private company no longer needs to appoint a company secretary, but may do so if it wishes.
- Shareholders' written resolutions – the requirement for unanimity in shareholders' written resolutions was abolished, and the required majority is similar to that for shareholder meetings: a simple majority of the eligible shares for ordinary resolutions, or 75% for special resolutions.
- Abolition of AGMs – private companies are no longer required to hold Annual General Meetings, although they can elect to provide for them in their articles if they wish.
- Short notice of meetings – private companies can convene meetings at short notice where consent is given by holders of 90% by nominal value of shares carrying the right to vote.
- Allotment of shares – where private companies have only one class of shares, the directors will have unlimited authority to allot shares unless the articles otherwise provide.
- Financial assistance – the Act abolishes the prohibition on private companies providing financial assistance for the purchase of their own shares, and the related "whitewash" exemption procedure, although public companies remain subject to financial assistance restrictions via Section 678.
- Reduction of share capital – private companies can now reduce their share capital without the need to obtain a court order.
- Filing of accounts – the period in which accounts must be filed has been reduced from 10 months to 9 months from the financial year end.

== Public and listed companies ==
The Act also seeks to promote greater shareholder involvement, and a number of new requirements are introduced for public companies, some of the provisions of which only apply to companies whose shares are listed on the main board of the London Stock Exchange (but, importantly, not to companies whose shares are listed on AIM).

- Business review – the Act imposes additional requirements for companies listed on the main board of the LSE in their annual report and accounts. These now include:
  1. main trends and factors likely to affect future development, performance and position of the business;
  2. information on environmental matters, employees and social issues; and
  3. information on contractual and other arrangements essential to the company's business.
- AGM and accounts – main list companies are now required to hold their AGM and file accounts within 6 months of the end of the financial year. They will also be required to:
  1. publish their annual report and accounts on their website;
  2. disclose results of polled votes at general meetings on their website;
  3. give certain minority shareholders the right to require independent scrutiny of any polled vote, the results of which must be published on the company's website.
- Political donations and expenditure – the Act contains simplification and clarification of the existing provisions requiring shareholder approval for political donations and expenditure, and clarifies a number of grey areas (such as expenditure relating to trade unions).
- Enfranchising indirect investors – nominee shareholders of main list companies can nominate persons on behalf of whom they hold shares to receive copies of company communications and annual reports and accounts. All companies can also include provisions in their articles to identify some other party to exercise additional rights of the shareholder. This is to address the concern that shares in publicly listed companies are frequently held in an intermediary's name, which makes it more difficult for the beneficial owners of the shares to exercise their rights as shareholder.
- Voting by institutions – the Act empowers the government to introduce regulations in the future that would require institutions to disclose how they have voted. The government has indicated it will only introduce such regulations after full consultation and if a voluntary disclosure scheme does not work.
- Paperless share transfers – the Act gives the government power to make regulations requiring (as well as permitting) paper-free holding and transferring of shares in main list companies.
- Transparency Obligations Directive – section 43 implements the EU Directive imposing obligations on main list companies in relation to financial reporting, disclosure of major acquisitions or disposals of its shares and the dissemination of information about the company to its shareholders and the public generally. The Act gives the Financial Services Authority (now the Financial Conduct Authority) power to make rules to implement the requirements of the Directive, which would be implemented by way of changes to the existing Listing Rules and Disclosure Rules. Under s.1270, the Act also introduced a statutory compensation scheme for misleading or inaccurate statements in reports.
- Takeovers – the EU Takeover Directive was implemented by interim regulations in the United Kingdom in May 2006. The Act extends the statutory basis for the regulations in relation to certain matters, such as the statutory footing of the Takeover Panel, and the City Code on Takeovers and Mergers. It also extended the "minority sweep up" provisions which were introduced by an amendment to the Companies Act 1985, and addresses certain practical problems which had arisen in relation to their operation.

== Contents ==
- Part 1 General introductory provisions, ss 1–6
- Part 2 Company formation, ss 7–16
- Part 3 A company's constitution, ss 17–38
- Part 4 A company's capacity and related matters, ss 39–52
- Part 5 A company's name, ss 53–85
- Part 6 A company's registered office, ss 86–88
- Part 7 Re-registration as a means of altering a company's status, ss 89–111
- Part 8 A company's members, ss 112–144
- Part 9 Exercise of members' rights, ss 145–153
- Part 10 A company's directors, ss 154–259
- Part 11 Derivative claims and proceedings by members, ss 260–269
- Part 12 Company secretaries, ss 270–280
- Part 13 Resolutions and meetings, ss 281–361
- Part 14 Control of political donations and expenditure, ss 362–379
- Part 15 Accounts and reports, ss 380–474
- Part 16 Audit, ss 475–539
- Part 17 A company's share capital, ss 540–657
- Part 18 Acquisition by limited company of its own shares, ss 658–737
- Part 19 Debentures, ss 738–754
- Part 20 Private and public companies, ss 755–767
- Part 21 Certification and transfer of securities, ss 768–790
- Part 22 Information about interests in a company's shares, ss 791–828
- Part 23 Distributions, ss 829–853
- Part 24 A company's annual return, ss 854–859
- Part 25 Company charges, ss 860–894
- Part 26 Arrangements and reconstructions, ss 895–901
- Part 27 Mergers and divisions of public companies, ss 902–941
- Part 28 Takeovers etc., ss 942–992
- Part 29 Fraudulent trading, s 993
- Part 30 Protection of members against unfair prejudice, ss 994–999
- Part 31 Dissolution and restoration to the register, ss 1000–1035
- Part 32 Company investigations: amendments, ss 1035–1039
- Part 33 UK companies not formed under companies legislation, ss 1040–1043
- Part 34 Overseas companies, ss 1044–1059
- Part 35 The registrar of companies, ss 1060
- Part 36 Offences under the Companies Acts, ss 1121–1133
- Part 37 Companies: supplementary provisions, ss 1134–1157
- Part 38 Companies: interpretation, ss 1158–1174
- Part 39 Companies: minor amendments, ss 1175–1181
- Part 40 Company directors: foreign disqualification etc., ss 1182–1191
- Part 41 Business names, ss 1192-1208
- Part 42 Statutory auditors, ss 1209–1264
- Part 43 Transparency obligations and related matters, ss 1265–1273
- Part 44 Miscellaneous provisions, ss 1274–1283
- Part 45 Northern Ireland ss 1284–1287
- Part 46 General and supplementary provisions, ss 1288–1292
- Part 47 Final provisions, ss 1298–1300
- Schedules 1–16

== Arrangements and reconstructions ==
Part 26 (sections 895–901) refers to arrangements and reconstructions to be applied between a company and its creditors or members. The principle which allows for 75% of the creditors or members (by value owed or held) to determine a workable arrangement is sometimes referred to as "creditor democracy".

== Strategic reports ==
The Companies Act 2006 (Strategic Report and Directors' Report) Regulations 2013 amended the Act with effect from 1 October 2013 and in respect of reporting years ending on or after 30 September 2013, creating a duty for large companies to prepare a "strategic report" which includes "a fair review of the company's business", and describes "the principal risks and uncertainties" facing it. The Companies, Partnerships and Groups (Accounts and Non-Financial Reporting) Regulations 2016 added a requirement that the strategic report include specified non-financial information, as required by the European Union's Non-financial Reporting Directive. The contents of a non-financial information statement must include:

- environmental matters (including the impact of the company's business on the environment),
- the company's employees,
- social matters,
- respect for human rights, and
- anti-corruption and anti-bribery matters.

== Reception ==
The reception of the act among legal professions in the United Kingdom was lukewarm. Concerns were expressed that too much detail has been inserted to seek to cover every eventuality. For example, Professor Len Sealy made various criticisms of the Act in the Sweet & Maxwell Company Law Newsletter. Whereas a complete overhaul of company law was promised, the Act seems to leave much of the existing structure in place, and to simplify certain aspects only at the margins.

== See also ==
- United Kingdom company law
- United States corporate law
- German company law
- European company law
- Companies Act
- Shareholder Rights Directive 2007 2007/36/EC
