= Companies House =

United Kingdom's registrar of companies

Coordinates: 51.4994°N 3.1895°W

Agency overview
- Formed: 5 September 1844; 182 years ago
- Headquarters: Crown Way Cardiff CF14 3UZ
- Employees: 1,000
- Agency executives: Andrew King, Chief Executive; Ros Rivaz, Chair
- Parent department: Department for Business and Trade
- Key document: Companies Act 2006
- Website: companieshouse.gov.uk

Companies House is the executive agency of the British Government that maintains the register of companies, employs the company registrars and is responsible for incorporating all forms of companies in the United Kingdom.

Prior to 1844, no central company register existed and companies could only be incorporated through letters patent and legislation. At the time, few incorporated companies existed; between 1801 and 1844, only about 100 companies were incorporated. The Joint Stock Companies Act 1844 created a centralised register of companies, enabled incorporation by registration, and established the office of the registrar; the Joint Stock Companies Act 1856 mandated separate registrars for each of the three UK jurisdictions. Initially just a brand, Companies House became an executive agency in 1988.

All public limited, private limited, private unlimited, chartered and some other companies are incorporated and registered with Companies House. The agency also registers limited partnerships, while most other enterprises fall under the purview of the Financial Conduct Authority. All limited companies (including subsidiary, small and inactive) must file annual financial statements with Companies House, all of which are public records. The agency is also responsible for dissolving companies.

From 2016, Companies House operated under the authority of the Department for Business, Energy and Industrial Strategy. This then became the Department for Business and Trade from 7 February 2023 following a Machinery of Government change initiated by Prime Minister Rishi Sunak. The current chief executive is Andrew King, who is also registrar for England and Wales. The agency, as well as British company law in general, is governed by the Companies Act 2006. As of May 2025, Companies House maintains records of over 5.44 million active companies, including over 5.11 million private limited companies and over 4,000 public limited companies.

== History ==
=== 19th century ===
Prior to 1844, companies could only be incorporated through grant of a royal charter, by private act of Parliament, or, from 1834, by letters patent. Few companies were incorporated, with only approximately 100 companies being incorporated by private act between 1801 and 1844. At this time, no central register of companies was in existence.

==== Joint Stock Companies Act 1844 ====
The origins of Companies House date back to 1844, the year the Joint Stock Companies Act received royal assent, enabling companies to be incorporated by registration for the first time. The Act created the office of the Registrar of Joint Stock Companies to maintain the register of companies, which was publicly accessible. It was hoped by MPs of the day that a publicly accessible central company register would help to protect the public from fraud. All companies, irrespective of their method of incorporation, were obliged to register within three months of the commencement of the Act.

The Act provided for two types of company registration: provisional, and complete. The filing requirements for complete registration were more extensive than those for provisional registration. Given that there was no requirement for companies granted a certificate of provisional registration to submit the remaining information in order to become completely registered, the Act was not hugely successful as many of its provisions applied only to completely registered companies.

The Joint Stock Companies Act 1844 applied only to England and Wales, and Ireland; it did not apply to Scotland.

Companies registered under the Joint Stock Companies Act 1844
Year	Number of companies	
Year	Provisionally registered	Fully registered
1844	119	–
1845	1,520	57
1846	292	112
1847	215	98
1848	123	63
1849	165	68
1850	159	57
1851	211	63
1852	414	110
1853	339	124
1854	239	132
1855	253	81

==== Limited Liability Act 1855 ====
Prior to the commencement of the Limited Liability Act 1855, shareholders were generally treated similarly to partners in a common law partnership, and had unlimited liability for the debts and obligations of the companies in which they held shares. From 1855, it became possible for shareholders to benefit from limited liability as a matter of routine, provided the companies in which they held shares were registered with the Registrar of Joint Stock Companies under the 1844 Act. The aim of this act was to incentivise the creation of new joint stock companies, while giving investors, the majority of whom did not play an active role in day-to-day management, protection from liabilities incurred by company directors.

==== Joint Stock Companies Act 1856 ====
The Joint Stock Companies Act 1856 abolished the dual registration system of the 1844 Act; provisional registration ceased to be possible. In exchange for providing shareholders with the benefit of limited liability, companies were required to submit certain information to the Registrar for Joint Stock Companies, including memoranda and articles of association (which had not previously been divided in this way), and annual reports.

The 1856 Act also mandated that there be a Registrar of Companies for each of the UK's three jurisdictions. This system remains today, with a separate Registrar of Companies for England and Wales, Scotland, and Northern Ireland; 'Companies House' is merely a brand adopted by the registrars.

Company registration in Scotland commenced in 1856, with the first company registered being the Daily Bulletin Company Limited, a newspaper publisher. The first Registrar of Joint Stock Companies for Scotland was George Deane, from 1856 to 1858, before he was transferred to the London office of Companies House to be Chief Clerk to the Registrar for England and Wales. The remaining staff were transferred to the office of the Queen's and Lord Treasurer's Remembrancer (Q&LTR), who took on the role of Registrar of Companies for Scotland.

=== 20th century ===
In 1982 the post of Q&LTR was transferred to the Crown Agent, and the staff and functions relating to company registration in Scotland were transferred to the Department of Trade and Industry on 1 April 1981.

In October 1988, Companies House became an executive agency of the Department of Trade and Industry, and then in October 1991 started to operate as a trading fund, self-financing by retaining income from charges.

=== 21st century ===
==== Companies Act 2006 ====
When the Companies Act 2006 was fully implemented on 1 October 2009, the Northern Ireland companies register was fully integrated into Companies House; previously, all limited companies in Northern Ireland were registered with the Department of Enterprise, Trade and Investment.

As government departments were reorganised, Companies House came under the Department for Business, Enterprise and Regulatory Reform (2007), the Department for Business, Innovation and Skills (2009), and the Department for Business, Energy and Industrial Strategy (2016). Companies House was a member of the Public Data Group, an advisory board which between 2011 and 2015 sought to improve public access to government data.

Companies House is also responsible for dissolving companies.

In 2020, there were approximately 4.3 million businesses on the Companies House register. In the same year Companies House ceased to operate as a trading fund.

Number of undertakings registered with Companies House
Year ended	Size of total register at year end
31 March 2014	3,250,300
31 March 2015	3,464,155
31 March 2016	3,678,860
31 March 2017	3,896,755
31 March 2018	4,033,355
31 March 2019	4,202,044
31 March 2020	4,350,913

==== Response to 2020 pandemic ====
In view of the coronavirus pandemic, from 25 March 2020 companies were able to apply for a three-month extension to the annual deadline for filing their accounts and reports. The Corporate Insolvency and Governance Act 2020 made this extension automatic for filing deadlines between 27 June 2020 and 5 April 2021; after the latter date, companies could again apply for a three-month extension. There were also temporary extensions to the deadlines for filing confirmation statements and certain event-driven filings.

==== Economic Crime and Corporate Transparency Act 2023 ====
The Economic Crime and Corporate Transparency Act 2023, receiving royal assent on 26 October 2023 and coming into force on 4 March 2024, signified a major legislative reform for Companies House. The act aims to transform Companies House from a mere repository of documents into an entity that proactively supervises company registration procedures and plays a role in preventing economic crimes. Central to the act is the requirement for identity verification of individuals wishing to incorporate a company, including directors, people with significant control, and members of limited liability partnerships; this applies to such individuals, both new and existing. In April 2025, Companies House started identity verification on a voluntary basis and from 18 November 2025, any company director or person with significant control must confirm their identity directly with the government or via an authorised corporate service provider.

== Registrars of Companies ==
The role of Registrar of Companies is not a political one, and the incumbent is a civil servant.

=== England and Wales ===
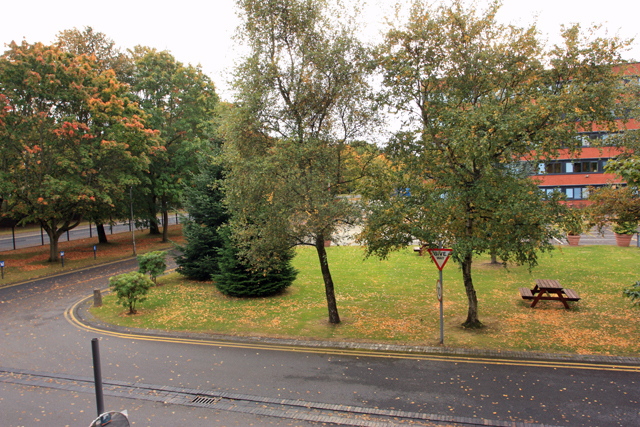
A corner of the Cardiff office

The Registrar of Companies for England and Wales is located in Cardiff, and is responsible for the registration of companies in England and Wales. Until 2011 there was another office in Nantgarw, Wales. The London office at Petty France is purely a facility to file and view documents, which are then processed in Cardiff.

=== Scotland ===
The Registrar of Companies for Scotland, is based at Companies House, Edinburgh, and is responsible for the registration of companies in Scotland. The current registrar is Lisa Davis.

=== Northern Ireland ===
The Registrar of Companies for Northern Ireland is based at Companies House, Belfast, and is responsible for the registration of companies in Northern Ireland. The current registrar is Lynn Cooper.

== Undertakings registered ==
=== Companies ===
Companies House acts as registrar for the following types of company:

- Public companies limited by shares
- Public companies limited by guarantee
- Societates Europaeae, which, following Brexit, can no longer be formed in the UK, with any SEs remaining registered in the UK on 1 January 2021 automatically converted to UK Societates
- Unlimited companies
- Private companies limited by shares
- Private companies limited by guarantee
- Community interest companies, on behalf of the Office of the Regulator of Community Interest Companies
- Companies incorporated by royal charter
- Some overseas companies with a physical presence in the UK

=== Other undertakings ===
Despite its name, Companies House acts not only as registrar for companies, but also for the following undertakings:

- Limited Partnerships
- Limited Liability Partnerships
- European economic interest groupings, which, following Brexit, can no longer be formed in the UK, with any EEIGs remaining registered in the UK on 1 January 2021 automatically converted to UK economic interest groupings

=== Undertakings for which Companies House does not act as registrar ===
Companies House does not act as registrar for the following undertakings:

- Building societies, for which the Financial Conduct Authority acts as registrar
- Charitable incorporated organisations, for which the Charity Commission acts as registrar
- Community benefit societies, for which the Financial Conduct Authority acts as registrar
- Co-operative societies, for which the Financial Conduct Authority acts as registrar
- Credit unions, for which the Financial Conduct Authority acts as registrar
- Friendly societies, for which the Financial Conduct Authority acts as registrar
- Partnerships, for which there is no registrar; the only registration required is with HM Revenue and Customs in order to submit tax returns

== Register of Companies ==
The Register of Companies is the index of every undertaking registered with Companies House.

=== Names ===
==== Uniqueness ====
Every undertaking registered with Companies House must have a unique name. Whether a name is unique or not is determined by Companies House; certain terms and punctuation, and characters after the first 60, are completely disregarded when assessing the uniqueness of a name, and other characters, although strictly different, are deemed to be the same as each other.

==== Restrictions ====
Companies may not have names which if used would constitute a criminal offence, or which are offensive. Approval from the Secretary of State is required if a company wishes to use a name indicating a connection to government, or other so-called 'sensitive' words or phrases.

==== Indication of status ====
Generally, undertakings registered with Companies House are required to indicate their legal form in their names:

- Public limited companies, the names of which must end with 'public limited company' or 'plc', or, in the case of Welsh companies if they so choose, the Welsh language equivalents 'cwmni cyfyngedig cyhoeddus' or 'ccc'
- Societates Europaeae, the names of which had to include 'SE' (replaced with 'UK Societas' for SEs remaining registered in the UK on 1 January 2021 as a consequence of Brexit)
- Private limited companies, the names of which ordinarily must end with 'limited' or 'ltd', or, in the case of Welsh companies if they so choose, the Welsh language equivalents 'cyfyngedig' or 'cyf'
- Community interest companies, the names of which must end with 'community interest company' or 'cic' (or, if it is a public company, 'community interest public limited company' or 'community interest plc'), or, in the case of Welsh companies if they so choose, the Welsh language equivalents 'cwmni buddiant cymunedol' or 'cbc' (or, if it is a public company, 'cwmni buddiant cymunedol cyhoeddus cyfyngedig' or 'cwmni buddiant cymunedol ccc')
- Limited partnerships, the names of which must end with 'limited partnership' or 'lp', or if the principal place of business is Wales and they so choose, the Welsh language equivalents 'partneriaeth cyfyngedig' or 'pc'
- Limited liability partnerships, the names of which must end with 'limited liability partnership' or 'llp', or in the case of Welsh limited liability partnerships if they so choose, the Welsh language equivalents 'partneriaeth atebolrwydd cyfyngedig' or 'pac'

Notwithstanding the above, private limited companies need not indicate their legal form in their names if they are charities, exempted by new regulations made by the Secretary of State, or subject to a continuing exemption.

=== Registered numbers ===
Every undertaking registered with Companies House is issued with a registered number. Once issued, a registered number remains the same, even if the undertaking changes its name.

Registered numbers consist of eight digits, and in certain circumstances a two letter prefix, including:

- Companies incorporated in Scotland: SC
- Companies incorporated in Northern Ireland: NI
- Companies incorporated by royal charter: RC (England and Wales), SR (Scotland), or NR (Northern Ireland)
- Overseas companies: FC (England and Wales), SF (Scotland), or NF (Northern Ireland)
- Limited partnerships: LP (England and Wales), SL (Scotland), or NL (Northern Ireland)
- Limited liability partnerships: OC (England and Wales), SO (Scotland), or NO (Northern Ireland)
- European economic interest groupings: GE (England and Wales), GS (Scotland), or GN (Northern Ireland)

=== Certificates of incorporation or registration ===
==== Certificates of incorporation ====
The Register of Companies contains certificates of incorporation for all undertakings incorporated by registration with Companies House. Incorporation takes place on the issuance of a certificate of incorporation by the registrar. Private limited companies can be issued with a certificate of incorporation within 24 hours of an application being submitted.

Certificates of incorporation for companies include the following information:

- Registered name
- Registered number
- Date of incorporation
- Whether the company is limited or unlimited, and if limited, whether by shares or guarantee
- Whether the company is private or public
- Whether the company's registered office is in England and Wales, Wales, Scotland, or Northern Ireland

Registration of companies is complete once the certificate of incorporation is signed or sealed by the registrar.

Certificates of incorporation for limited liability partnerships include the following information:

- Registered name
- Registered number
- Date of incorporation
- Whether the limited liability partnership's registered office is in England and Wales, Wales, Scotland, or Northern Ireland

Incorporation of a limited liability partnerships is complete once the certificate of incorporation is signed or sealed by the registrar.

==== Certificates of registration ====
Limited partnerships are not issued with certificate of incorporation upon registration with Companies House, but instead with certificates of registration. This is because limited partnerships are not legal persons and therefore are not created by incorporation.

Certificates of registration include the following information:

- Registered name
- Registered number
- Date of registration
- A statement that the limited partnership is registered as a limited partnership under the Limited Partnerships Act 1907

A limited partnership comes into existence once its certificate of registration has been signed or sealed by the registrar.

=== Accuracy ===
Companies House does not verify the accuracy of information filed. The Department for Business, Energy and Industrial Strategy announced in 2020 that Companies House would be given powers to verify the identities of company directors, but did not set a timetable for their introduction.

=== Other public registers ===
Since June 2016, private companies can elect to keep certain statutory records on the central register which is held and published by Companies House, instead of maintaining their own registers. These records include:

- Register of members
- Register of people with significant control
- Register of directors
- Register of directors' usual residential addresses
- Register of secretaries

== Controversy ==
In February 2008, The Times and Computer Weekly broke a story that almost 4,000 of the names on the Companies House register of directors were on international watchlists of alleged fraudsters, money launderers, terror financiers and corrupt officials. The results came from Datanomic who had screened the 6.8 million names on the register against a World-Check database of high risk individuals and businesses. The exercise also revealed more than 1,500 disqualified company directors were being allowed to run other UK companies as Companies House was not checking names against its register of disqualified persons.

In 2026, a problem with the Companies House website led to logged in users possibly being able to view and edit other companies' information, such as residential addresses and dates of birth. The security vulnerability was present for six months. No passwords were compromised in the data breach.

== See also ==
- List of official business registers
