= Corporate law =

Body of law that governs businesses

Corporate law (also known as company law or enterprise law) is the body of law governing the rights, relations, and conduct of persons, companies, organizations, and businesses. The term refers to the legal practice of law relating to corporations, or to the theory of corporations. Corporate law often describes the law relating to matters that derive directly from the life-cycle of a corporation. It thus encompasses the formation, funding, governance, and death of a corporation.

While the minute nature of corporate governance as personified by share ownership, capital market, and business culture rules differ, similar legal characteristics and legal problems exist across many jurisdictions. Corporate law regulates how corporations, investors, shareholders, directors, employees, creditors, and other stakeholders such as consumers, the community, and the environment interact with one another. Whereas the terms company law or business law may be colloquially used interchangeably with corporate law, the term business law in fact refers to wider concepts of commercial law, which is the law governing commercial and business-related activities. Depending on the legal system, this may include matters relating to corporate governance, financial law, contract law and other pertinent areas.

== Overview ==
Academics identify five legal characteristics universal to business enterprises. These are:

- Separate legal personality of the corporation (access to tort and contract law in a manner similar to a person)
- Limited liability of the shareholders (a shareholder's personal liability is limited to the value of their shares in the corporation)
- Transferable shares (if the corporation is a public company, the shares are publicly listed and traded)
- Delegated management under a board structure; the board of directors delegates day-to-day management of the company to executives.
- Shared ownership: people can own stock and it can be distributed either by shareholders selling it or it can be issued by the corporation [Note: this doesn’t mean there can’t be one owner. It just means there can be more than one owner as a result of share distribution or issuing.

Widely available and user-friendly corporate law enables business participants to possess these four legal characteristics and thus transact as businesses. Thus, corporate law is a response to three endemic forms of opportunism: conflicts between managers and shareholders, between controlling and non-controlling shareholders, and between shareholders and other contractual counterparts (including creditors and employees).

A corporation may accurately be called a company; however, a company should not necessarily be called a corporation, which has distinct characteristics. In the United States, a company may or may not be a separate legal entity, and is often used synonymously with "firm" or "business." According to Black's Law Dictionary, in America, a company means "a corporation — or, less commonly, an association, partnership or union — that carries on industrial enterprise." Other types of business associations can include partnerships (in the UK governed by the Partnership Act 1890), or trusts (such as a pension fund), or companies limited by guarantee (like some community organizations or charities). Corporate law deals with companies that are incorporated or registered under the corporate or company law of a sovereign state or its sub-national states.

The defining feature of a corporation is its legal independence from the shareholders that own it. Under corporate law, corporations of all sizes have a separate legal personality, with limited or unlimited liability for its shareholders. Shareholders control the company through a board of directors, which, in turn, typically delegates control of the corporation's day-to-day operations to a full-time executive. Shareholders' losses, in the event of liquidation, are limited to their stake in the corporation, and they are not liable for any remaining debts owed to the corporation's creditors. This rule is known as limited liability, and it is why the names of corporations typically end with "Ltd." or a similar designation, such as "Inc." or "plc."

Under almost all legal systems corporations have much the same legal rights and obligations as individuals. In some jurisdictions, this extends to allow corporations to exercise human rights against real individuals and the state, and they may be responsible for human rights violations. Just as they are "born" into existence through their members obtaining a certificate of incorporation, they can "die" when they lose money into insolvency. Corporations can even be convicted of criminal offences, such as corporate fraud and corporate manslaughter.

=== History ===
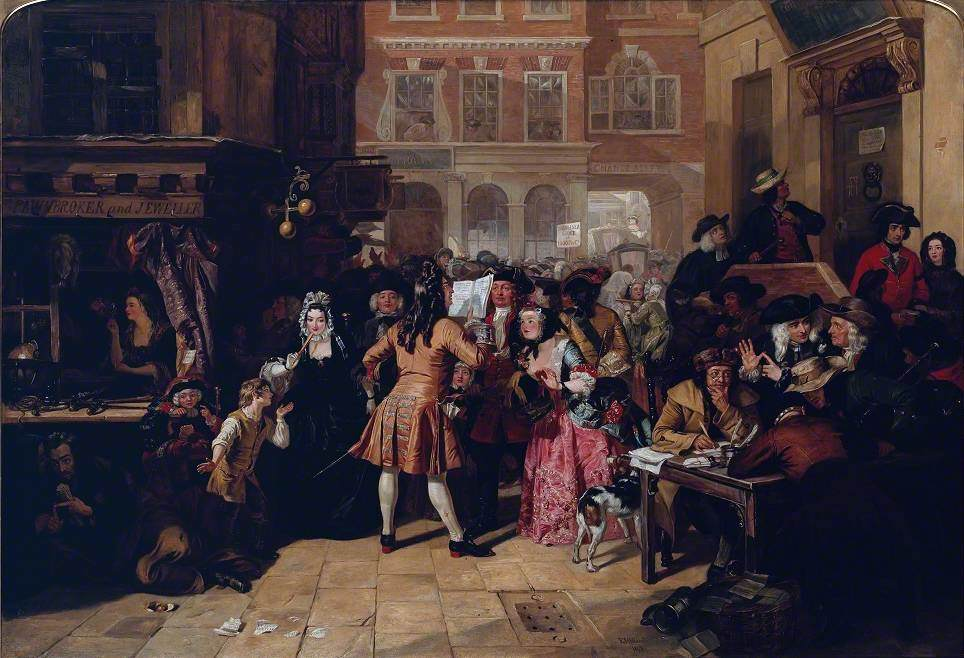
The South Sea Bubble by Edward Matthew Ward, 1847. A Hogarthian image of the South Sea Bubble, Tate Gallery

Although some forms of companies are thought to have existed during Ancient Rome and Ancient Greece, the closest recognizable ancestors of the modern company did not appear until the 16th century. With increasing international trade, Royal charters were granted in Europe (notably in England and Holland) to merchant adventurers. The Royal charters usually conferred special privileges on the trading company (including, usually, some form of monopoly). Originally, traders in these entities traded stock on their own account, but later the members came to operate on a joint account and with joint stock, and the new Joint stock company was born.

Early companies were purely economic ventures; it was only a belatedly established benefit of holding joint stock that the company's stock could not be seized for the debts of any individual member. The development of company law in Europe was hampered by two notorious "bubbles" (the South Sea Bubble in England and the Tulip Bulb Bubble in the Dutch Republic) in the 17th century, which set the development of companies in the two leading jurisdictions back by over a century in popular estimation.

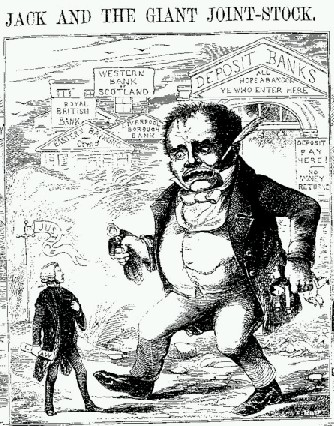
"Jack and the Giant Joint-Stock", a cartoon in Town Talk (1858) satirizing the 'monster' joint-stock economy that came into being after the Joint Stock Companies Act 1844

Companies returned to the forefront of commerce, although in England, to circumvent the Bubble Act 1720, investors had reverted to trading the stock of unincorporated associations, until it was repealed in 1825. However, the process of obtaining Royal charters was insufficient to keep up with demand. In England, there was a lively trade in the charters of defunct companies. It was not until the Joint Stock Companies Act 1844 that the first equivalent of modern companies, formed by registration, appeared. Soon after came the Limited Liability Act 1855, which, in the event of a company's bankruptcy, limited the liability of all shareholders to the amount of capital they had invested.

The beginning of modern company law came when the two pieces of legislation were codified under the Joint Stock Companies Act 1856 at the behest of the then Vice President of the Board of Trade, Mr Robert Lowe. That legislation shortly gave way to the railway boom, and from there the number of companies formed soared. In the late nineteenth century, depression took hold, and just as company numbers had boomed, many began to implode and fall into insolvency. Much stronger academic, legislative and judicial opinion was opposed to the notion that businessmen could escape accountability for their role in the failing businesses. The last significant development in the history of companies was the decision of the House of Lords in Salomon v. Salomon & Co. where the House of Lords confirmed the separate legal personality of the company, and that the liabilities of the company were separate and distinct from those of its owners.

== Corporate structure ==
The law of business organizations originally derived from the common law of England, and has evolved significantly in the 20th century. In common law countries today, the most commonly addressed forms are:

- Corporation
- Limited company
- Unlimited company
- Limited liability partnership
- Limited partnership
- Not-for-profit corporation
- Company limited by guarantee
- Partnership
- Sole proprietorship
- Privately held company

The proprietary limited company is a statutory business form in several countries, including Australia. Many countries have forms of business entity unique to that country, although there are equivalents elsewhere. Examples are the limited liability company (LLC) and the limited liability limited partnership (LLLP) in the United States. Other types of business organizations, such as cooperatives, credit unions and publicly owned enterprises, can be established with purposes that parallel, supersede, or even replace the profit maximization mandate of business corporations.

Various types of company can be formed in different jurisdictions, but the most common forms of companies are:

- a company limited by guarantee. Commonly used where companies are formed for non-commercial purposes, such as clubs or charities. The members guarantee the payment of certain (usually nominal) amounts if the company goes into insolvent liquidation, but otherwise they have no economic rights in relation to the company.
- a company limited by guarantee with a share capital. A hybrid entity, usually used where the company is formed for non-commercial purposes, but the activities of the company are partly funded by investors who expect a return.
- a company limited by shares. The most common form of company used for business ventures.
- an unlimited company either with or without a share capital. This is a hybrid company, a company similar to its limited company (Ltd.) counterpart but where the members or shareholders do not benefit from limited liability should the company ever go into formal liquidation.

There are, however, many specific categories of corporations and other business organizations which may be formed in various countries and jurisdictions throughout the world.

=== Corporate legal personality ===
One of the key legal features of corporations are their separate legal personality, also known as "personhood" or being "artificial persons". However, the separate legal personality was not confirmed under English law until 1895 by the House of Lords in Salomon v. Salomon & Co. Separate legal personality often has unintended consequences, particularly in relation to smaller, family companies. In B v. B [1978] Fam 181 it was held that a discovery order obtained by a wife against her husband was not effective against the husband's company as it was not named in the order and was separate and distinct from him. And in Macaura v. Northern Assurance Co Ltd a claim under an insurance policy failed where the insured had transferred timber from his name into the name of a company wholly owned by him, and it was subsequently destroyed in a fire; as the property now belonged to the company and not to him, he no longer had an "insurable interest" in it and his claim failed.

Separate legal personality allows corporate groups flexibility in relation to tax planning, and management of overseas liability. For instance, in Adams v. Cape Industries plc it was held that victims of asbestos poisoning at the hands of an American subsidiary could not sue the English parent in tort. Whilst academic discussion highlights certain specific situations where courts are generally prepared to "pierce the corporate veil", to look directly at, and impose liability directly on the individuals behind the company, the actual practice of piercing the corporate veil is, at English law, non-existent. However, the court will look beyond the corporate form where the corporation is a sham or perpetuates a fraud. The most commonly cited examples are:

- where the company is a mere façade
- where the company is effectively just the agent of its members or controllers
- where a representative of the company has taken some personal responsibility for a statement or action
- where the company is engaged in fraud or other criminal wrongdoing
- where the natural interpretation of a contract or statute is as a reference to the corporate group and not the individual company
- where permitted by statute (for example, many jurisdictions provide for shareholder liability where a company breaches environmental protection laws)

==== Capacity and powers ====
Historically, because companies are artificial persons created by operation of law, the law prescribed what the company could and could not do. Usually, this was an expression of the commercial purpose for which the company was formed for, and came to be referred to as the company's objects, and the extent of the objects is referred to as the company's capacity. If an activity fell outside the company's capacity, it was said to be ultra vires and void.

By way of distinction, the organs of the company were expressed to have various corporate powers. If the objects were the things that the company was able to do, then the powers were the means by which it could do them. Usually, expressions of powers were limited to methods of raising capital, although from earlier times, distinctions between objects and powers have caused lawyers difficulty. Most jurisdictions have now modified the position by statute, and companies generally have capacity to do all the things that a natural person could do, and power to do it in any way that a natural person could do it.

However, references to corporate capacity and powers have not quite been consigned to the dustbin of legal history. In many jurisdictions, directors can still be liable to their shareholders if they cause the company to engage in businesses outside its objects, even if the transactions are still valid as between the company and the third party. And many jurisdictions also still permit transactions to be challenged for lack of "corporate benefit", where the relevant transaction has no prospect of being for the commercial benefit of the company or its shareholders.

As artificial persons, companies can only act through human agents. The main agent who deals with the company's management and business is the board of directors, but in many jurisdictions, other officers can be appointed too. The board of directors is normally elected by the members, and the other officers are normally appointed by the board. These agents enter into contracts on behalf of the company with third parties.

Although the company's agents owe duties to the company (and, indirectly, to the shareholders) to exercise those powers for a proper purpose, generally speaking, third parties' rights are not impugned if the officers were acting improperly. Third parties are entitled to rely on the ostensible authority of agents held out by the company to act on its behalf. A line of common law cases reaching back to Royal British Bank v Turquand established in common law that third parties were entitled to assume that the internal management of the company was being conducted properly, and the rule has now been codified into statute in most countries.

Accordingly, companies will normally be liable for all the acts and omissions of their officers and agents. This will include almost all torts, but the law relating to crimes committed by companies is complex, and varies significantly between countries.

==== Corporate crime ====
- Corporate Manslaughter and Corporate Homicide Act 2007

=== Corporate governance ===
Corporate governance is primarily the study of the power relations among a corporation's senior executives, its board of directors and those who elect them (shareholders in the "general meeting" and employees), as well as other stakeholders, such as creditors, consumers, the environment and the community at large. One of the main differences between different countries in the internal form of companies is between a two-tier and a one tier-board. The United Kingdom, the United States, and most Commonwealth countries have single unified boards of directors. In Germany, companies have two tiers, so that shareholders (and employees) elect a "supervisory board", and then the supervisory board chooses the "management board". There is the option to use two tiers in France, and in the new European Companies (Societas Europaea).

Recent literature, especially from the United States, has begun to discuss corporate governance in the terms of management science. While post-war discourse centred on how to achieve effective "corporate democracy" for shareholders or other stakeholders, many scholars have shifted to discussing the law in terms of principal–agent problems. On this view, the basic issue of corporate law is that when a "principal" party delegates his property (usually the shareholder's capital, but also the employee's labour) into the control of an "agent" (i.e. the director of the company) there is the possibility that the agent will act in his own interests, be "opportunistic", rather than fulfill the wishes of the principal. Reducing the risks of this opportunism, or the "agency cost", is said to be central to the goal of corporate law.

==== Constitution ====
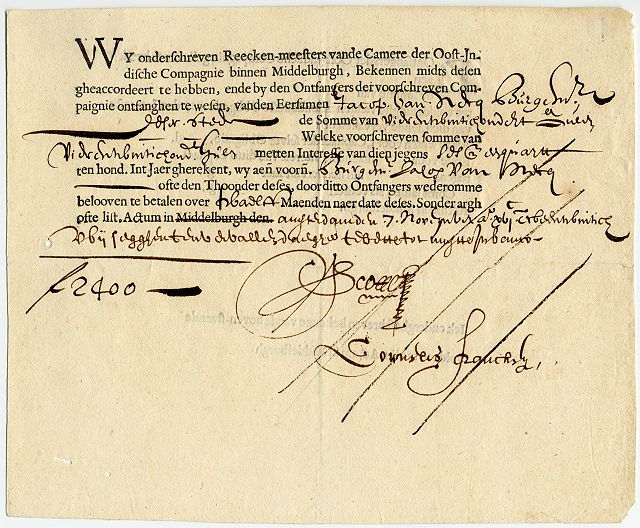
A bond issued by the Dutch East India Company, dating from 7 November 1623, for the amount of 2,400 florins

The rules for corporations derive from two sources. These are the country's statutes: in the US, usually the Delaware General Corporation Law (DGCL); in the UK, the Companies Act 2006 (CA 2006); in Germany, the Aktiengesetz (AktG) and the Gesetz betreffend die Gesellschaften mit beschränkter Haftung (GmbH-Gesetz, GmbHG). The law will set out which rules are mandatory, and which rules can be derogated from. Examples of important rules which cannot be derogated from would usually include how to fire the board of directors, what duties directors owe to the company or when a company must be dissolved as it approaches bankruptcy. Examples of rules that members of a company would be allowed to change and choose could include what kind of procedure general meetings should follow, when dividends get paid out, or how many members (beyond a minimum set out in the law) can amend the constitution. Usually, the statute will set out model articles, which the corporation's constitution will be assumed to have if it is silent on a particular procedure.

The United States, and a few other common law countries, split the corporate constitution into two separate documents (the UK got rid of this in 2006). The memorandum of association (or articles of incorporation) is the primary document, and will generally regulate the company's activities with the outside world. It states which objects the company is meant to follow (e.g., "this company makes automobiles") and specifies the authorised share capital of the company. The by-laws are the secondary document, and will generally regulate the company's internal affairs and management, such as procedures for board meetings, dividend entitlements, etc. In the event of any inconsistency, the memorandum prevails and in the United States, only the memorandum is publicised. In civil law jurisdictions, the company's constitution is normally consolidated into a single document, often called the charter.

It is quite common for members of a company to supplement the corporate constitution with additional arrangements, such as shareholders' agreements, whereby they agree to exercise their membership rights in a certain way. Conceptually, a shareholders' agreement fulfills many of the same functions as the corporate constitution, but because it is a contract, it will not normally bind new members of the company unless they accede to it somehow. One benefit of shareholders' agreements is that they will usually be confidential, as most jurisdictions do not require shareholders' agreements to be publicly filed. Another common method of supplementing the corporate constitution is by means of voting trusts, although these are relatively uncommon outside the United States and certain offshore jurisdictions. Some jurisdictions consider the company seal to be a part of the "constitution" (in the loose sense of the word) of the company, but the requirement for a seal has been abrogated by legislation in most countries.

==== Balance of power ====
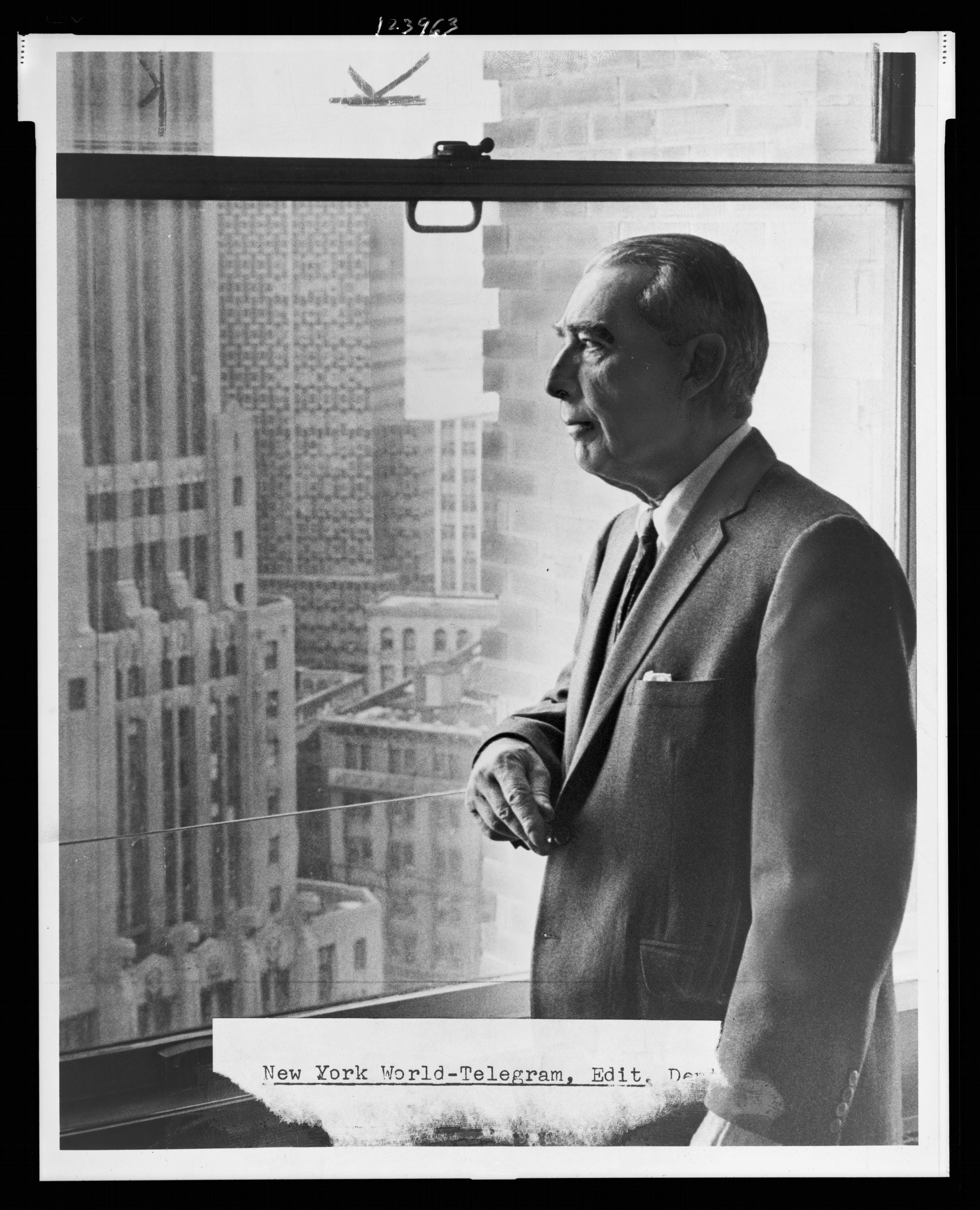
Adolf Berle in The Modern Corporation and Private Property argued that the separation of control of companies from the investors who were meant to own them endangered the American economy and led to a maldistribution of wealth.

The most important rules for corporate governance are those concerning the balance of power between the board of directors and the members of the company. Authority is given or "delegated" to the board to manage the company for the success of the investors. Certain specific decision rights are often reserved for shareholders, where their interests could be fundamentally affected. There are necessarily rules on when directors can be removed from office and replaced. To do that, meetings need to be called to vote on the issues. How easily the constitution can be amended and by whom necessarily affects the relations of power.

It is a principle of corporate law that the directors of a company have the right to manage. This is expressed in statute in the DGCL, where §141(a) states,

(a) The business and affairs of every corporation organized under this chapter shall be managed by or under the direction of a board of directors, except as may be otherwise provided in this chapter or in its certificate of incorporation.

In Germany, §76 AktG says the same for the management board, while under §111 AktG, the supervisory board's role is stated to be to "oversee" (überwachen). In the United Kingdom, the right to manage is not laid down in law, but is found in Part.2 of the Model Articles. This means it is a default rule, which companies can opt out of (s.20 CA 2006) by reserving powers to members, although companies rarely do. UK law specifically reserves shareholders' right and duty to approve "substantial non-cash asset transactions" (s.190 CA 2006), which means those over 10% of the company value, with a minimum of £5,000 and a maximum of £100,000. Similar rules, though much less stringent, exist in §271 DGCL and through case law in Germany under the so-called Holzmüller-Doktrin.

Probably the most fundamental guarantee that directors will act in the members' interests is that they can easily be sacked. During the Great Depression, two Harvard scholars, Adolf Berle and Gardiner Means, wrote The Modern Corporation and Private Property, an attack on American law which failed to hold directors to account, and linked the growing power and autonomy of directors to the economic crisis. In the UK, the right of members to remove directors by a simple majority is assured under s.168 CA 2006 Moreover, Art. 21 of the Model Articles requires a third of the board to put themselves up for re-election every year (in effect creating maximum three-year terms). 10% of shareholders can demand a meeting at any time, and 5% can if it has been a year since the last one (s.303 CA 2006). In Germany, where employee participation creates the need for greater boardroom stability, §84(3) AktG states that management board directors can only be removed by the supervisory board for an important reason (ein wichtiger Grund) though this can include a vote of no-confidence by the shareholders. Terms last for five years, unless 75% of shareholders vote otherwise. §122 AktG lets 10% of shareholders demand a meeting. In the US, Delaware lets directors enjoy considerable autonomy. §141(k) DGCL states that directors can be removed without any cause, unless the board is "classified", meaning that directors only come up for re-appointment in different years. If the board is classified, then directors cannot be removed unless there is gross misconduct. Director's autonomy from shareholders is seen further in §216 DGCL, which allows for plurality voting and §211(d), which states shareholder meetings can only be called if the constitution allows for it. The problem is that in America, directors usually choose where a company is incorporated and §242(b)(1) DGCL says any constitutional amendment requires a resolution by the directors. By contrast, constitutional amendments can be made at any time by 75% of shareholders in Germany (§179 AktG) and the UK (s.21 CA 2006).

Countries with co-determination employ the practice of workers of an enterprise having the right to vote for representatives on the board of directors in a company.

=== Director duties ===
In most jurisdictions, directors owe strict duties of good faith, as well as duties of care and skill, to safeguard the interests of the company and the members. In many developed countries outside the English-speaking world, company boards are appointed as representatives of both shareholders and employees to "codetermine" company strategy. Corporate law is often divided into corporate governance (which concerns the various power relations within a corporation) and corporate finance (which concerns the rules on how capital is used).

Directors also owe strict duties not to permit any conflict of interest or conflict with their duty to act in the best interests of the company. This rule is so strictly enforced that, even where the conflict of interest or conflict of duty is purely hypothetical, the directors can be forced to disgorge all personal gains arising from it. In Aberdeen Ry v. Blaikie (1854) 1 Macq HL 461, Lord Cranworth stated in his judgment that,

"A corporate body can only act by agents, and it is, of course, the duty of those agents so to act as best to promote the interests of the corporation whose affairs they are conducting. Such agents have duties to discharge of a fiduciary nature towards their principal. And it is a rule of universal application that no one, having such duties to discharge, shall be allowed to enter into engagements in which he has, or can have, a personal interest conflicting or which possibly may conflict, with the interests of those whom he is bound to protect... So strictly is this principle adhered to that no question is allowed to be raised as to the fairness or unfairness of the contract entered into..."

However, in many jurisdictions, the members of the company are permitted to ratify transactions which would otherwise fall foul of this principle. It is also largely accepted in most jurisdictions that this principle should be capable of being abrogated in the company's constitution.

The standard of skill and care that a director owes is usually described as acquiring and maintaining sufficient knowledge and understanding of the company's business to enable him to properly discharge his duties. This duty enables the company to seek compensation from its director if it can be proved that a director has not shown reasonable skill or care, which in turn has caused the company to incur a loss. In many jurisdictions, where a company continues to trade despite foreseeable bankruptcy, the directors can be forced to account for trading losses personally. Directors are also strictly charged to exercise their powers only for a proper purpose. For instance, were a director to issue a large number of new shares, not for the purposes of raising capital but to defeat a potential takeover bid, that would be an improper purpose.

== Company law theory ==
Ronald Coase has pointed out, that all business organizations represent an attempt to avoid certain costs associated with doing business. Each is meant to facilitate the contribution of specific resources - investment capital, knowledge, relationships, and so forth - towards a venture which will prove profitable to all contributors. Except for the partnership, all business forms are designed to provide limited liability to both members of the organization and external investors. Business organizations originated with agency law, which permits an agent to act on behalf of a principal, in exchange for the principal assuming equal liability for the wrongful acts committed by the agent. For this reason, all partners in a typical general partnership may be held liable for the wrongs committed by one partner. Those forms that provide limited liability can do so because the state provides a mechanism by which businesses that follow certain guidelines will be able to escape the full liability imposed under agency law. The state provides these forms because it has an interest in the strength of the companies that provide jobs and services therein, but also has an interest in monitoring and regulating their behaviour.

== Litigation ==
Members of a company generally have rights against each other and against the company, as framed under the company's constitution. However, members cannot generally claim against third parties who cause damage to the company which results in a diminution in the value of their shares or others' membership interests because this is treated as "reflective loss" and the law normally regards the company as the proper claimant in such cases.

In relation to the exercise of their rights, minority shareholders usually have to accept that, because of the limits of their voting rights, they cannot direct the overall control of the company and must accept the will of the majority (often expressed as majority rule). However, majority rule can be iniquitous, particularly where there is one controlling shareholder. Accordingly, a number of exceptions have developed in law in relation to the general principle of majority rule.

- Where the majority shareholder(s) are exercising their votes to perpetrate a fraud on the minority, the courts may permit the minority to sue
- members always retain the right to sue if the majority acts to invade their personal rights, e.g., where the company's affairs are not conducted in accordance with the company's constitution (this position has been debated because the extent of a personal right is not set in law). Macdougall v Gardiner and Pender v Lushington present irreconcilable differences in this area.
- in many jurisdictions minority shareholders can take a representative or derivative action in the name of the company, where the company is controlled by the alleged wrongdoers

== Corporate finance ==
Throughout the operational life of the corporation, perhaps the most crucial aspect of corporate law relates to raising capital for the business to operate. The law, as it relates to corporate finance, not only provides the framework for which a business raises funds, but also provides a forum for principles and policies which drive the fundraising, to be taken seriously. Two primary methods of financing exist about corporate financing, these are:

- Equity financing; and
- Debt financing

Each has relative advantages and disadvantages, both at law and economically. Additional methods of raising capital necessary to finance its operations are that of retained profits. Various combinations of financing structures have the capacity to produce fine-tuned transactions which, using the advantages of each form of financing, support the limitations of the corporate form, its industry, or economic sector. A mix of both debt and equity is crucial to the sustained health of the company, and its overall market value is independent of its capital structure. One notable difference is that interest payments on debt are tax-deductible whilst payments of dividends are not; this will incentivise a company to issue debt financing rather than preferred stock to reduce their tax exposure.

=== Shares and share capital ===
A company limited by shares, whether public or private, must have at least one issued share; however, depending on the corporate structure, the formatting may differ. If a company wishes to raise capital through equity, it will usually do so by issuing shares (sometimes called "stock" (not to be confused with stock-in-trade)) or warrants. In the common law, whilst a shareholder is often colloquially referred to as the owner of the company, it is clear that the shareholder is not an owner of the company but is a member of the company and entitles them to enforce the provisions of the company's constitution against the company and against other members. A share is an item of property, and can be sold or transferred. Shares also normally have a nominal or par value, which is the limit of the shareholder's liability to contribute to the debts of the company in an insolvent liquidation. Shares usually confer a number of rights on the holder. These will normally include:

- voting rights
- rights to dividends (or payments made by companies to their shareholders) declared by the company
- rights to any return of capital either upon redemption of the share, or upon the liquidation of the company
- in some countries, shareholders have preemption rights, whereby they have a preferential right to participate in future share issues by the company

Companies may issue different types of shares, called "classes" of shares, offering different rights to the shareholders depending on the underlying regulatory rules pertaining to corporate structures, taxation, and capital market rules. A company might issue both ordinary shares and preference shares, with the two types having different voting and/or economic rights. It might provide that preference shareholders shall each receive a cumulative preferred dividend of a certain amount per annum, but the ordinary shareholders shall receive everything else. Corporations will structure capital raising in this way in order to appeal to different lenders in the market by providing different incentives for investment. The total value of issued shares in a company is said to represent its equity capital. Most jurisdictions regulate the minimum amount of capital which a company may have, although some jurisdictions prescribe minimum amounts of capital for companies engaging in certain types of business (e.g., banking, insurance, etc.). Similarly, most jurisdictions regulate the maintenance of equity capital, and prevent companies from returning funds to shareholders by way of distribution when this might leave the company financially exposed. Often this extends to prohibiting a company from providing financial assistance for the purchase of its own shares.

== Dissolution ==
Events such as mergers, acquisitions, insolvency, or the commission of a crime affect the corporate form. In addition to the creation of the corporation, and its financing, these events serve as a transition phase into either dissolution, or some other material shift.

=== Mergers and acquisitions ===
A merger or acquisition can often mean the altering or extinguishing of the corporation.

=== Corporate insolvency ===
If unable to discharge its debts promptly, a corporation may end up in bankruptcy liquidation. Liquidation is the normal means by which a company's existence is brought to an end. It is also referred to (either alternatively or concurrently) in some jurisdictions as winding up or dissolution. Liquidations generally come in two forms: either compulsory liquidations (sometimes called creditors' liquidations) and voluntary liquidations (sometimes called members' liquidations, although a voluntary liquidation where the company is insolvent will also be controlled by the creditors, and is properly referred to as a creditors' voluntary liquidation). Where a company goes into liquidation, normally a liquidator is appointed to gather in all the company's assets and settle all claims against the company. If there is any surplus after paying off all the creditors of the company, this surplus is then distributed to the members.

As its names imply, applications for compulsory liquidation are normally made by creditors of the company when the company is unable to pay its debts. However, in some jurisdictions, regulators have the power to apply for the liquidation of the company on the grounds of public good, i.e., where the company is believed to have engaged in unlawful conduct, or conduct which is otherwise harmful to the public at large.

Voluntary liquidations occur when the company's members decide voluntarily to wind up the affairs of the company. This may be because they believe that the company will soon become insolvent, or it may be on economic grounds if they believe that the purpose for which the company was formed is now at an end, or that the company is not providing an adequate return on assets and should be broken up and sold off.

Some jurisdictions also permit companies to be wound up on "just and equitable" grounds. Generally, applications for just and equitable winding-up are brought by a member of the company who alleges that the affairs of the company are being conducted in a prejudicial manner, and asks the court to bring an end to the company's existence. For obvious reasons, in most countries, the courts have been reluctant to wind up a company solely based on the disappointment of one member, regardless of how well-founded that member's complaints are. Accordingly, most jurisdictions that permit just and equitable winding up also permit the court to impose other remedies, such as requiring the majority shareholder(s) to buy out the disappointed minority shareholder at a fair value.

=== Insider dealing ===
Insider trading is the trading of a corporation's stock or other securities (e.g., bonds or stock options) by individuals with potential access to non-public information about the company. In most countries, trading by corporate insiders such as officers, key employees, directors, and large shareholders may be legal if this trading is done in a way that does not take advantage of non-public information. However, the term is frequently used to refer to a practice in which an insider or a related party trades based on material non-public information obtained during the performance of the insider's duties at the corporation, or otherwise in breach of a fiduciary or other relationship of trust and confidence or where the non-public information was misappropriated from the company. Illegal insider trading is believed to raise the cost of capital for securities issuers, thus decreasing overall economic growth.

In the United States and several other jurisdictions, trading conducted by corporate officers, key employees, directors, or significant shareholders (in the United States, defined as beneficial owners of ten percent or more of the firm's equity securities) must be reported to the regulator or publicly disclosed, usually within a few business days of the trade. Many investors follow the summaries of these insider trades in the hope that mimicking these trades will be profitable. While "legal" insider trading cannot be based on material non-public information, some investors believe corporate insiders nonetheless may have better insights into the health of a corporation (broadly speaking) and that their trades otherwise convey important information (e.g., about the pending retirement of an important officer selling shares, greater commitment to the corporation by officers purchasing shares, etc.)

== Trends and developments ==
Most case law on the matter of corporate governance dates to the 1980s and primarily addresses hostile takeovers, however, current research considers the direction of legal reforms to address issues of shareholder activism, institutional investors and capital market intermediaries. Corporations and boards are challenged to respond to these developments. Shareholder demographics have been affected by trends in worker retirement, with more institutional intermediaries like mutual funds playing a role in employee retirement. These funds are more motivated to partner with employers to have their fund included in a company's retirement plans than to vote their shares – corporate governance activities only increase costs for the fund, while the benefits would be shared equally with competitor funds.

Shareholder activism prioritizes wealth maximization and has been criticized as a poor basis for determining corporate governance rules. Shareholders do not decide corporate policy, that is done by the board of directors, but shareholders may vote to elect board directors and on mergers and other changes that have been approved by the directors. They may also vote to amend corporate bylaws. Broadly speaking, there have been three movements in 20th-century American law that sought a federal corporate law: the Progressive Movement, some aspects of proposals made in the early stages of the New Deal and again in the 1970s during a debate about the effect of corporate decision-making on states. However, these movements did not establish federal incorporation. Although there has been some federal involvement in corporate governance rules as a result, the relative rights of shareholders and corporate officers are still mostly regulated by state laws. There is no federal legislation like there is for corporate political contributions or regulation of monopolies and federal laws have developed along different lines than state laws.

== By region ==
=== Europe ===
European company law is the part of European Union law which concerns the formation, operation and insolvency of companies (or corporations) in the European Union. The EU creates minimum standards for companies throughout the EU, and has its own corporate forms. All member states continue to operate separate companies acts, which are amended from time to time to comply with EU Directives and Regulations. There is, however, also the option of businesses to incorporate as a Societas Europaea (SE), which allows a company to operate across all member states.

==== Germany ====
German company law (Gesellschaftsrecht) is an influential legal regime for companies in Germany. The primary form of company is the public company or Aktiengesellschaft (AG). A private company with limited liability is known as a Gesellschaft mit beschränkter Haftung (GmbH). A partnership is called a Kommanditgesellschaft (KG).

==== United Kingdom ====
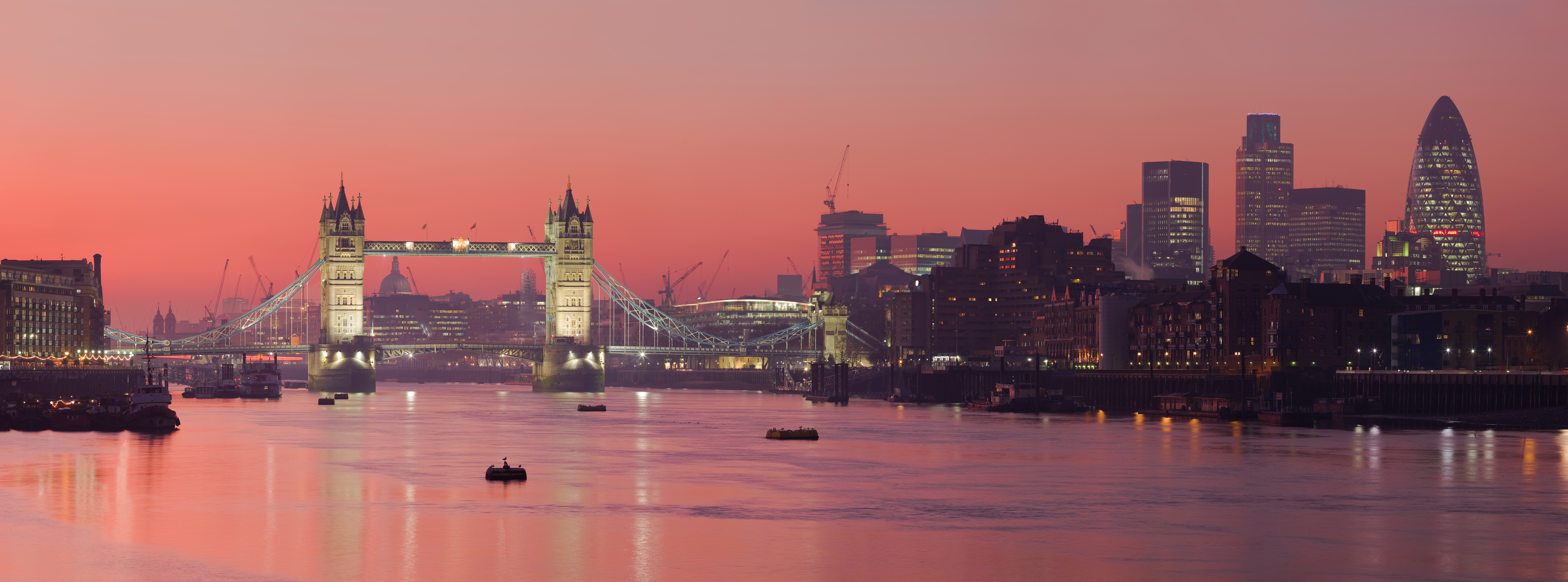
The City of London, containing the London Stock Exchange, is the financial heart of the United Kingdom.

British company law regulates corporations formed under the Companies Act 2006. Also governed by the Insolvency Act 1986, the UK Corporate Governance Code and court cases, some of which formerly implemented European Union Directives, the company is the primary legal vehicle to organise and run a business. Tracing their modern history to the late Industrial Revolution, public companies now employ more people and generate more wealth in the United Kingdom economy than any other form of organisation. The United Kingdom was the first country to draft modern corporation statutes, where, through a simple registration procedure, any investors could incorporate, limit liability to their commercial creditors in the event of business insolvency, and where management was delegated to a centralised board of directors. An influential model within Europe, the Commonwealth and as an international standard setter, British law has always given people broad freedom to design the internal company rules, so long as the mandatory minimum rights of investors under its legislation are complied with.

Company law, or corporate law, can be broken down into two main fields, corporate governance and corporate finance. Corporate governance in the UK mediates the rights and duties among shareholders, employees, creditors and directors. Since the board of directors habitually possesses the power to manage the business under a company constitution, a central theme is what mechanisms exist to ensure directors' accountability. British law is "shareholder-friendly" in that shareholders, to the exclusion of employees, typically exercise sole voting rights in the general meeting. The general meeting holds a series of minimum rights to change the company constitution, issue resolutions and remove members of the board. In turn, directors owe a set of duties to their companies. Directors must carry out their responsibilities with competence, in good faith and undivided loyalty to the enterprise. If the mechanisms of voting do not prove enough, particularly for minority shareholders, directors' duties and other member's rights may be vindicated in court. Of central importance in public and listed companies is the securities market, typified by the London Stock Exchange. Through the Takeover Code, the UK strongly protects the right of shareholders to be treated equally and freely to company shares.

Corporate finance concerns the two money-raising options for limited companies. Equity finance involves the traditional method of issuing shares to build up a company's capital. Shares can contain any rights the company and purchaser wish to contract for, but generally grant the right to participate in dividends after a company earns profits and the right to vote in company affairs. A purchaser of shares is helped to make an informed decision directly by prospectus requirements of full disclosure, and indirectly through restrictions on financial assistance by companies for the purchase of their own shares. Debt finance means getting loans, usually at a fixed annual interest repayment. Sophisticated lenders, such as banks, typically contract for a security interest over the assets of a company, so that in the event of default on loan repayments, they may seize the company's property directly to satisfy debts.

Creditors are also, to some extent, protected by the courts' power to set aside unfair transactions before a company goes under, or recoup money from negligent directors engaged in wrongful trading. If a company is unable to pay its debts as they fall due, UK insolvency law requires an administrator to attempt a rescue of the company (if the company itself has the assets to pay for this). If rescue proves impossible, a company's life ends when its assets are liquidated, distributed to creditors and the company is struck off the register. If a company becomes insolvent with no assets it can be wound up by a creditor, for a fee (not that common), or more commonly by the tax creditor (HMRC).

=== United States ===
In the United States, most corporations are incorporated, or organized, under the laws of a particular state. The laws of the state of incorporation normally govern a corporation's internal operations, even if the corporation's operations take place outside that state. Corporate law differs from state to state. Because of these differences, some businesses will benefit from having a corporate lawyer determine the most appropriate or advantageous state in which to incorporate.

Business entities may also be regulated by federal laws and, in some cases, by local laws and ordinances.

==== Delaware ====
A majority of publicly traded companies in the U.S. are Delaware corporations. Some companies choose to incorporate in Delaware because the Delaware General Corporation Law offers lower corporate taxes than many other states. Many venture capitalists prefer to invest in Delaware corporations. Also, the Delaware Court of Chancery is widely recognized as a good venue for the litigation of business disputes.

== See also ==
- Business ethics
- Competition law
- Compliance (regulation)
- Consumer law
- Corporate crime
- Corporation sole
- Delaware Journal of Corporate Law
- Enterprise Act 2002
- European Company Statute
- Financial law
- Insolvency law
- Labour law
- List of companies named after people
- List of company registers
- Public service law
- Quasi corporation
- Race to the bottom
- Securities regulation in the United States
- State-owned enterprise
- Types of companies
