= History of bankruptcy law =

The history of bankruptcy law begins with the first legal remedies available for recovery of debts. Bankruptcy is the legal status of a legal person unable to repay debts.

== Ancient world ==
In Ancient Greece, bankruptcy did not exist. If a man owed and he could not pay, he and his wife, children or servants were forced into "debt slavery", until the creditor recouped losses via their physical labour. Many city-states in ancient Greece limited debt slavery to a period of five years and debt slaves had protection of life and limb, which regular slaves did not enjoy. However, servants of the debtor could be retained beyond that deadline by the creditor and were often forced to serve their new lord for a lifetime, usually under significantly harsher conditions.

In Judaism and the Torah, or Old Testament, every seventh year is decreed by Mosaic Law as a Sabbatical year wherein the release of all debts that are owed by members of the Jewish community is mandated, but not of "gentiles". The seventh Sabbatical year, or forty-ninth year, is then followed by another Sabbatical year known as the Year of Jubilee wherein the release of all debts is mandated, for fellow community members and foreigners alike, and the release of all debt-slaves is also mandated. The Year of Jubilee is announced in advance on the Day of Atonement, or the tenth day of the seventh Biblical month, in the forty-ninth year by the blowing of trumpets throughout the land of Israel.

The Talmud describes several rules for dividing assets among debtors with different claims, each of which is applicable in different situations. Among them are the contested garment rule, the constrained equal awards rule, and the constrained equal losses rule.

In Islamic teaching, according to the Quran, an insolvent person was deemed to be allowed time to be able to pay out his debt. This is recorded in the Quran's second chapter (Sura Al-Baqara), Verse 281, which notes: "And if someone is in hardship, then let there be postponement until a time of ease. But if you give from your right as charity, then it is better for you, if you only knew."

== Medieval period ==
Medieval canon law discussed extensively provisions to mitigate the harshness of debtors' punishments. Most commentators allowed for a debtor to be discharged and make a fresh start, after ceding to his creditors all his goods (or possibly all his goods except some bare necessities). These provisions later influenced English law.

Bankruptcy is also documented in East Asia. According to al-Maqrizi, the Yassa of Genghis Khan contained a provision that mandated the death penalty for anyone who became bankrupt three times.

Philip II of Spain had to declare four state bankruptcies in 1557, 1560, 1575 and 1596. Spain became the first sovereign nation in history to declare bankruptcy.

== Post-medieval England ==
In England, the first recognised piece of legislation was the Statute of Bankrupts (34 & 35 Hen. 8. c. 4). Bankrupts were seen as crooks, and the act stated its aim to prevent "crafty debtors" escaping the realm. A more humane approach was developed in the Bankruptcy Act 1705 (4 & 5 Ann. c. 4), passed on 19 March 1706. The Lord Chancellor was given power to discharge bankrupts, once disclosure of all assets and various procedures had been fulfilled. In Fowler v Padget Lord Kenyon reasserted the old sentiment that "Bankruptcy is considered a crime and a bankrupt in the old laws is called an offender."

The bankrupt was seen as being bonded to his creditors. Under the Insolvent Debtors (England) Act 1813 (53 Geo. 3. c. 102), debtors could request release after 14 days in jail by taking an oath that their assets did not exceed £20, but if any of their creditors objected, they had to stay inside. Attitudes were changing, however, and the Bankruptcy Act 1825 (6 Geo. 4. c. 16) allowed people to start proceedings for their own bankruptcy, in agreement with creditors. Previously only creditors could start the proceedings. Bankruptcy proceedings agreed between creditors and debtor also occurred when a trader filed a declaration of insolvency in the office of the Chancellor's Secretary of Bankrupts, which was then advertised. The advertised declaration supported a commission in bankruptcy to be issued. A law was thereafter enacted, which declared that no commission grounded on this act of bankruptcy was to be "deemed invalid by reason of such declaration having been concerted or agreed upon between the bankrupt and any creditor or other person." Voluntary bankruptcy was not authorized until the passing of the Bankruptcy Law Consolidation Act 1849 (12 & 13 Vict. c. 106).

In the middle of the 19th century, attitudes towards corporations were also quickly changing. Since the South Sea Bubble disaster, companies were viewed as inefficient and dangerous. But with the Industrial Revolution in full swing that changed. The Joint Stock Companies Act 1844 (7 & 8 Vict. c. 110) allowed people to create companies without permission through a royal charter. Companies had "separate legal personality", the ability to sue and be sued, and served as an easy mechanism for raising capital through the purchase of shares (an equitable title) in the company's capital. The act's corollary, to bring the existence of these "legal persons" to an end was the Joint Stock Companies Winding-Up Act 1844. The Limited Liability Act 1855 produced a further innovation. Before, if a corporation had gone broke, the people that lent it money (creditors) could sue all the shareholders to pay off the company's debts. But the 1855 act said that shareholders' liability would be limited to the amount they had paid for their shares of stock. The Joint Stock Companies Act 1856 consolidated the companies legislation in one, and the modern law of corporate insolvency was born. Finally, the Bankruptcy Act 1869 was passed allowing all people, rather than just traders to file for bankruptcy.

== See also ==
- UK insolvency law
- Debtors' prison
- Fleet Prison
- Marshalsea Prison
- King's Bench Prison
- Debtors' Act 1869
- Hard Times
- Mr Micawber in David Copperfield

== Bibliography ==
Articles

- Coffee, John C. (2009). "What went wrong? An initial inquiry into the causes of the 2008 financial crisis". Journal of Corporate Law Studies. 9 (1): 1. doi:10.1080/14735970.2009.11421533. S2CID 153278046.
- Levinthal, Louis Edward (1918). "The Early History of Bankruptcy Law". University of Pennsylvania Law Review. 66 (5): 223–250. doi:10.2307/3314078. JSTOR 3314078.
- Levinthal, Louis Edward (1919). "The Early History of English Bankruptcy". University of Pennsylvania Law Review. 67 (1): 1–20. doi:10.2307/3314453. JSTOR 3314453.
- Treiman, Israel (1927). "Escaping the Creditor in the Middle Ages". Law Quarterly Review. 43: 230. JSTOR 1333915.

Reports

- Report of the Commission on Bankruptcy Laws of the United States, H.R. Doc. No. 93-137, 93d. Cong., 1st Sess., Part I (1973), reprinted in B Collier on Bankruptcy, App. Pt. 4-308 – 4-311 (15th rev. ed.)
