= History of company law in the United Kingdom =

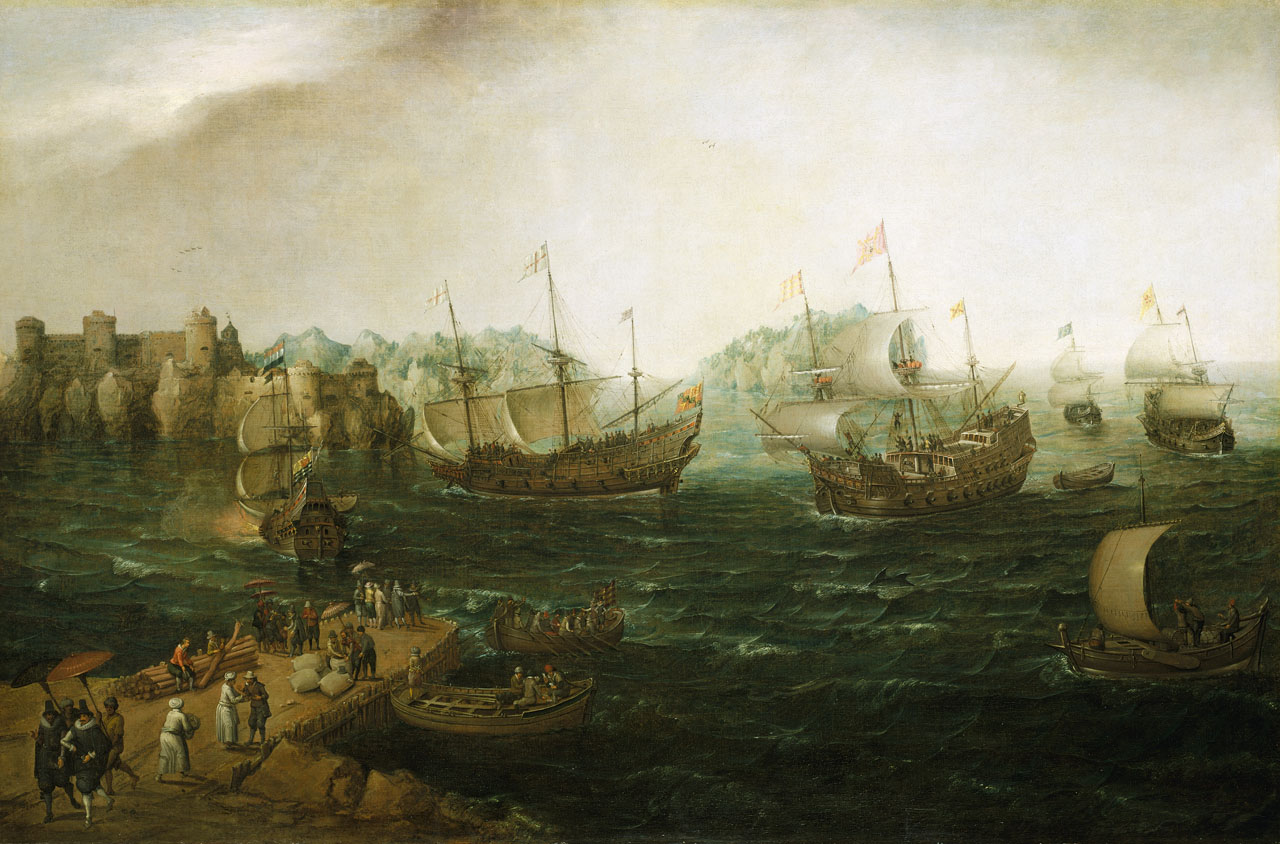
Hendrick Cornelisz Vroom's depiction in 1614 of competing British East India Company and Dutch East India Company ships, both with monopolies to trade. Other chartered corporations, still in existence include the Hudson's Bay Company (est 1670) and the Bank of England (est 1694).

The history of company law in the United Kingdom concerns the change and development in UK company law within the context of the history of companies, deriving from its predecessors in Roman and English law. Company law in its current form dates from the mid-nineteenth century, however other forms of business association developed long before.

== Medieval business ==
In medieval times traders would typically act through private law constructs, such as partnerships. These arose at common law whenever people acted together with a view to profit. Early guilds and livery companies were also often involved in the regulation of trade among themselves.

- List of organisations with a British royal charter

== Mercantile corporations ==
As England sought to build a mercantile Empire, the government created corporations under a Royal Charter or an Act of Parliament with the grant of a monopoly over a specified territory. The best known example, established in 1600, was the British East India Company. Queen Elizabeth I granted it the exclusive right to trade with all countries to the east of the Cape of Good Hope. Corporations at this time would essentially act on the government's behalf, bringing in revenue from its exploits abroad. Subsequently, the Company became increasingly integrated with British military and colonial policy, just as most UK corporations were essentially dependent on the British navy's ability to control trade routes.

== Chartered corporations ==
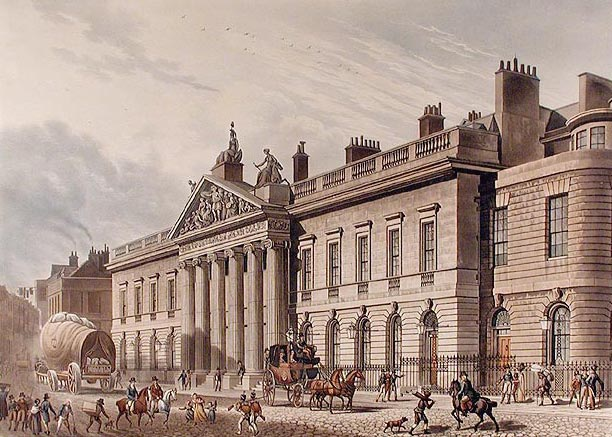
The British East India Company's headquarters in London

- 1319: Company of Merchants of the Staple of England
- 1407: Company of Merchant Adventurers of London
- 1553: Company of Merchant Adventurers to New Lands
- 1555: Muscovy Company
- 1577: Spanish Company
- 1579: Eastland Company
- 1581: Turkey Company
- 1588: Morocco Company
- 1600: East India Company (HEIC)^{a}
- 1604: New River Company
- 1605: Levant Company^{b}
- 1606: Virginia Company
- 1609: French Company
- 1610: London and Bristol Company
- 1616: Somers Isles Company
- 1629: Massachusetts Bay Company
- 1629: Providence Island Company
- 1664–1674: Royal West Indian Company
- 1670: Hudson's Bay Company
- 1672: Royal African Company
- 1693: Greenland Company

^{a} Became the largest colonial empire in the 19th century.
^{b} Merger of the Turkey and Venetian Companies.

- 1694, Bank of England
- 1634: Guinea Company of Scotland
- 1698: Company of Scotland

== South Sea Bubble ==
A similar chartered company, the South Sea Company, was established in 1711 to trade in the Spanish South American colonies, but met with less success. The South Sea Company's monopoly rights were backed by the Treaty of Utrecht, signed in 1713 as a settlement following the War of Spanish Succession, which gave the United Kingdom an assiento to supply slaves and engage in limited trade in other goods in the region for a period of thirty years. The trading started slowly and was in any case limited in extent by the terms of the assiento, but it was hoped that it would lead to breaking into the traditionally closed Spanish markets in America. Investors in the UK, enticed by extravagant promises of profit from the company promoters, bought thousands of shares. By 1717, the South Sea Company was so wealthy that it assumed the public debt of the UK government. This accelerated the inflation of the share price further, as did the Bubble Act 1720, which (possibly with the motive of protecting the South Sea Company from competition) prohibited the establishment of any companies without a Royal Charter. The share price rose so rapidly that people began buying shares merely in order to sell them at a higher price, which in turn led to higher share prices. This was the first speculative bubble the country had seen, but by the end of 1720, the bubble had "burst", and the share price sank from £1000 to under £100. As bankruptcies and recriminations ricocheted through government and high society, the mood against corporations, and errant directors, was bitter.

== Prohibition ==
The Bubble Act 1720s prohibition on establishing companies remained in force until 1824.

Even in 1776, Adam Smith wrote in The Wealth of Nations that mass corporate activity could not match private entrepreneurship, because people in charge of others' money would not exercise as much care as they would with their own. As he put it,

The directors of such companies, however, being the managers rather of other people's money than of their own, it cannot well be expected, that they should watch over it with the same anxious vigilance with which the partners in a private copartnery frequently watch over their own. Like the stewards of a rich man, they are apt to consider attention to small matters as not for their master's honour, and very easily give themselves a dispensation from having it. Negligence and profusion, therefore, must always prevail, more or less, in the management of the affairs of such a company. It is upon this account, that joint-stock companies for foreign trade have seldom been able to maintain the competition against private adventurers.

== Colonialism and imperialism ==
- 1752: African Company of Merchants (abolished 1821)
- 1792: Sierra Leone Company
- 1824: Van Diemen's Land Company
- 1835: South Australian Company
- 1839: New Zealand Company
- 1847: Eastern Archipelago Company
- 1881: British North Borneo Company
- 1886: Royal Niger Company
- 1888: Imperial British East Africa Company
- 1889: British South Africa Company

== Development of modern company law ==
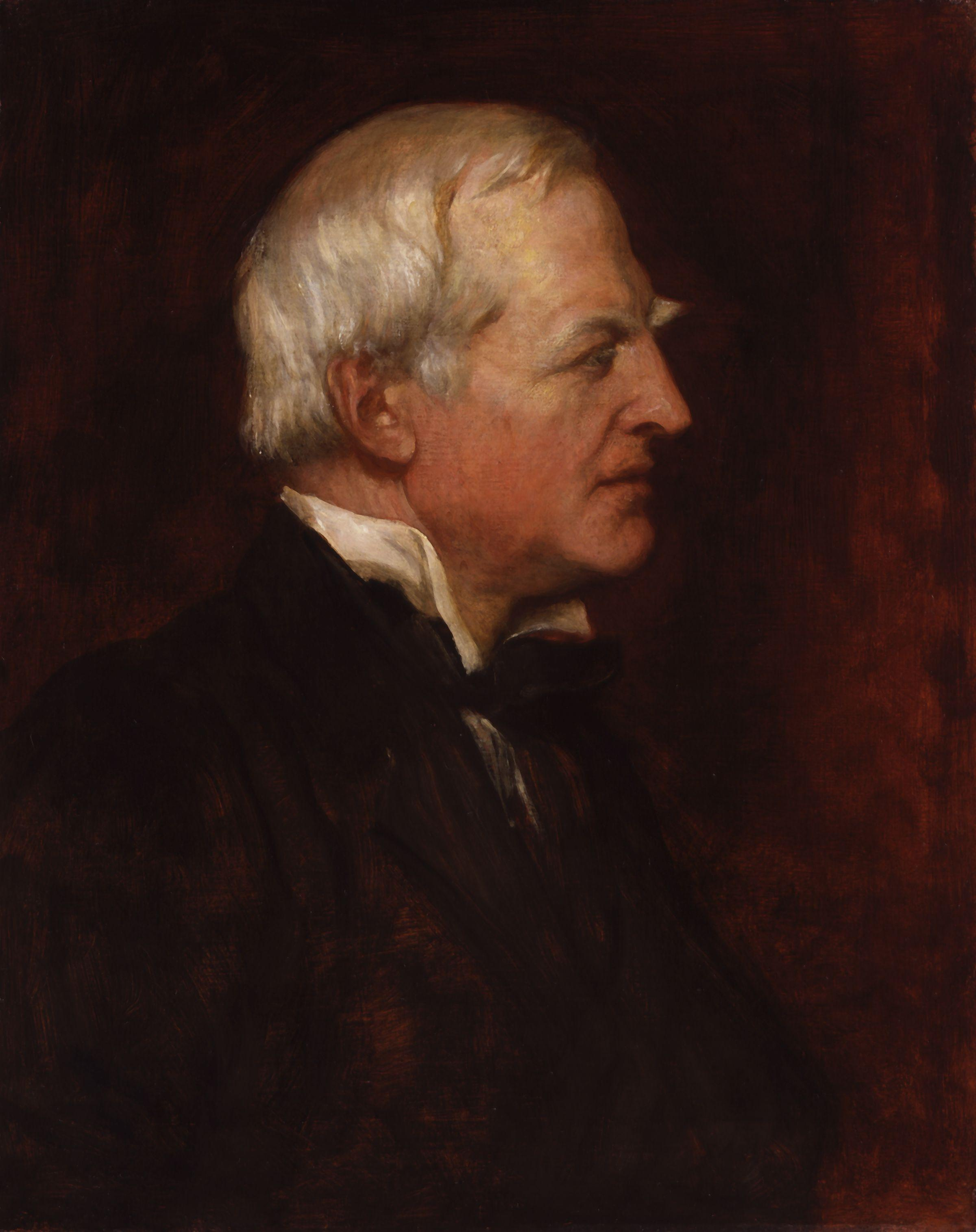
Robert Lowe, then Vice President of the Board of Trade has been dubbed the "father of modern company law" for his role in drafting the 1855 reforms.

By the 1820s the Industrial Revolution had gathered pace, pressing for legal change to facilitate business activity. Restrictions were gradually lifted on ordinary people incorporating until, under the Joint Stock Companies Act 1844, it was possible through a simple registration procedure to incorporate. The advantage of establishing a company as a separate legal person was mainly administrative, as a unified entity under which the rights and duties of all investors and managers could be channeled. The most important development, was the Limited Liability Act 1855, which allowed investors to limit their liability in the event of business failure to the amount they invested in the company. These two features – a simple registration procedure and limited liability – were subsequently codified in the first modern company law Act, the Joint Stock Companies Act 1856. A series of Companies Acts up to the present Companies Act 2006 have essentially retained the same fundamental features.

== Twentieth century ==
Over the twentieth century, companies in the UK became the dominant organisational form of economic activity, which raised concerns about how accountable those who controlled companies were to those who invested in them. The first reforms following the Great Depression, in the Companies Act 1948, ensured that directors could be removed by shareholders with a simple majority vote.

In 1977, the government's Bullock Report proposed reform to allow employees to participate in selecting the board of directors, as was happening in across Europe, exemplified by the German Codetermination Act 1976. However the UK never implemented the reforms, and from 1979 the debate shifted.

Through the 1990s the focus in corporate governance turned toward internal control mechanisms, such as auditing, separation of the chief executive position from the chair, and remuneration committees to place some check on excessive executive pay. These rules applicable to listed companies, now found in the UK Corporate Governance Code, have been complemented principles based regulation of institutional investors activity in company affairs.

The UK's integration in the European Union meant a steadily growing body of EU Directives and case law to harmonise company law within the internal market.

== See also ==
- UK company law
- UK labour law

== General and cited references ==
Articles

- HA Shannon (October 1933). "The Limited Companies of 1866–1883". The Economic Historic Review. 4:3. pp. 290–316. doi:10.1111/j.1468-0289.1933.tb02257.x/. JSTOR 2590649.

Books

- PL Davies and LCB Gower, Principles of Modern Company Law (6th ed., Sweet and Maxwell, 1997) chapters 2–4
- J Micklethwait and A Wooldridge The company: A short history of a revolutionary idea (Modern Library, 2003)
- V Barnes and J Hardman, Origins of Company Law (Hart, 2024)
