= Joint Stock Companies Winding-Up Act 1844 =

Act of the Parliament of the United Kingdom

Joint Stock Companies Act 1844
- Act of Parliament
- Parliament of the United Kingdom
- Long title: An Act for facilitating the winding up the Affairs of Joint Stock Companies unable to meet their pecuniary Engagements.
- Citation: 7 & 8 Vict. c. 111
- Territorial extent: United Kingdom

Dates
- Royal assent: 5 September 1844
- Commencement: 1 November 1844 (Note: Section 32.)
- Repealed: 2 November 1862
Other legislation
| Amended by | Joint Stock Companies Act 1856 |
| Repealed by | Companies Act 1862 |
| Relates to | Joint Stock Companies Act 1844; Limited Liability Act 1855 |

Status: Repealed

Text of statute as originally enacted

The Joint Stock Companies Winding-Up Act 1844 (7 & 8 Vict. c. 111) was an act of the Parliament of the United Kingdom. The act concerned dealing with Joint Stock Companies that were unable to meet their financial obligations.

The act enabled a company to be made bankrupt in the same way an individual could be made bankrupt. The outcome of the legislation being that remedies were available only against a company's property, as the act made a distinction between the company itself and the members of the company.

== Subsequent developments ==
The whole act was repealed by section 107 of the Joint Stock Companies Act 1856 (19 & 20 Vict. c. 47), which came into force on 14 July 1856.

The whole act was repealed by section 205 of, and the first part of the third schedule to, the Companies Act 1862 (25 & 26 Vict. c. 89), which came into force on 2 November 1862.

== See also ==
- UK insolvency law
- UK bankruptcy law
- History of bankruptcy law
