= Forster v Wilson =

English court case

- Court: Exchequer of Pleas
- Decided: 17 November 1843
- Citation: (1843) 152 ER 1165

Court membership
- Judge sitting: Parke B

Keywords
- Set off, insolvency

Forster v Wilson (1843) 152 ER 1165 is a UK insolvency law and English property law case, concerning the right to set off a debt against an insolvent company. It establishes that a person with a right to set off is not subject to the pooling of assets in insolvent liquidation.

== Facts ==
Mr Wilson (among others) was in debt to a group of bankers that had gone bankrupt (the company was Batson & Co). Mr Forster had been assigned by this group the right to sue to get the debt back. Mr Wilson had been given £5 notes, issued by the bank, by some of his customers in his own business. Mr Wilson had also received other £5 notes, for which they were to pay so much only as they should receive from the assignees for such notes.

The question was whether Mr Wilson could set off the amounts in the £5 notes against the debts he owed to the bank.

== Judgment ==
Parke B held that Mr Wilson (and the other defendants) had a beneficial interest in the first type of notes, and were therefore entitled to set them off. But he was not entitled to set off the last-mentioned class, as they held them merely as trustees for others.

In the course of the argument in this case, the Court gave its opinion as to the right of set-off, with respect to all the classes of promissory notes received by the defendants, except the four last, the sixth, seventh, eighth, and ninth, which are substantially only two: and the question as to these is one rather of fact than of law, viz. whether the defendants held these notes on their own account, or as agents or trustees for others.

The right of set-off in bankruptcy does not appear to rest on the same principle as the right of set-off between solvent parties. The latter is given by the statutes of set-off (2 Geo. 2, c. 22, (Note: Insolvent Debtors Relief (No. 2) Act 1728 (2 Geo. 2. c. 22)) s. 13, and 8 Geo. 2, c. 24, (Note: Set-off Act 1734 (8 Geo. 2. c. 24)) s. 4) to prevent cross actions; and if the defendant could sue the plaintiff for a debt due to him not in his representative character, he might set it off under these statutes in an action by a plaintiff suing in his individual character also; though the plaintiff or defendant might claim their respective debts as a trustee for a third person. If the debts were legal debts due to each in his own right, it would be sufficient. But, under the bankrupt statutes, the mutual credit clause has not been so construed. The object of this clause (originally introduced in a temporary act, 4 & 5 Anne, c. 17, (Note: Bankruptcy Act 1705 (4 & 5 Ann. c. 4)) continued by 5 Geo. 2, c. 30, (Note: Bankrupts Act 1731 (5 Geo. 2. c. 30)) and now re-enacted by the 6 Geo 4, c. 16) (Note: Bankruptcy Act 1825 (6 Geo. 4. c. 16)) is not to avoid cross actions, for none would lie against assignees, and one against the bankrupt would be unavailing, but to do substantial justice between the parties, where a debt is really due from the bankrupt to the debtor to his estate; and the Court of King's Bench, in construing this clause, (for it is the same clause in substance in the two last-named statutes), have held that it did not authorize a set-off, where the debt, though legally due to the debtor from the bankrupt, was really due to him as a trustee for another, and, though recoverable in a cross action, would not have been recovered for his own benefit. This appears to have been the main ground of the decision in the case of Fair v M'Iver (16 East, 130), and we conceive that the principle of that decision was correct. The difficulty in the present case consists in the application of that principle to the facts.

We think it clear that the two last classes of notes, the eighth and ninth, which were handed over by persons not debtors to the defendants, were held by the defendants, not on their own account, but as trustees for those persons, because the defendants could gain nothing in any event by the notes, but all the money they should receive upon them would be received to the use of the persons who transferred them. We have no doubt, therefore, that the defendants have no right of set-off in this respect.

The other two classes, the sixth and seventh, are in effect the same, and the Court have had some doubt, whether, upon the facts stated in the case, they ought to decide that the notes were held by the defendants as trustees for their debtors, or not. We now think, however, that they were not. The case states that they were handed over in payment of antecedent debts, and, if so, they became the property of the defendants, and the whole beneficial interest passed in the first instance to them; but then it is said, that they were given on a condition, that the defendants were to debit themselves with so much only as they should receive from the assignees. Does this mean, that they were to be held for the debtors until the amount of the dividend should be ascertained, and not put to the credit of the account until then; or does it mean merely to exclude the presumption that the defendants took them for their full value, and to express what the law would have implied, if they had taken them to account simply, and had duly presented them to the bank for payment? We think the latter was the true meaning of the parties, and, consequently, that the defendants had a right of set-off on those notes.

The verdict will therefore be entered for £50.

== Treatment ==
Forster v. Wilson has been cited in insolvency law treatises around common law jurisdictions for 150 years.

== See also ==
- UK insolvency law
