= Limited liability =

Business structure where shareholders cannot owe more than their stake in a venture

Limited liability is a legal status in which a person's financial liability is limited to a fixed sum, most commonly the value of a person's investment in a corporation, company, or joint venture. If a company that provides limited liability to its investors is sued, then the claimants are generally entitled to collect only against the assets of the company, not the assets of its shareholders or other investors. A shareholder in a corporation or limited liability company is not personally liable for any of the debts of the company, other than for the amount already invested in the company and for any unpaid amount on the shares in the company, if any—except under special and rare circumstances that permit "piercing the corporate veil." The same is true for the members of a limited liability partnership and the limited partners in a limited partnership. By contrast, sole proprietors and partners in general partnerships are each liable for all the debts of the business (unlimited liability).

Although a shareholder's liability for the company's actions is limited, the shareholders may still be liable for their own acts. For example, the directors of small companies (who are frequently also shareholders) are often required to give personal guarantees of the company's debts to those lending to the company. They will then be liable for those debts that the company cannot pay, although the other shareholders will not be so liable. This is known as co-signing. A shareholder who is also an employee of the corporation may be personally liable for actions the employee takes in that capacity on behalf of the corporation, in particular torts committed within the scope of employment.

Limited liability for shareholders for contracts entered by the corporation is not controversial because this could and probably would be agreed to by both parties to the contract. However, limited liability for shareholders for torts (or harms that have not been agreed to in advance) is controversial because of concerns that such limited liability could lead to excessive risk-taking by companies and more negative externalities (i.e., more harm to third parties) than would be produced in the absence of limited liability. According to one estimate, negative corporate externalities on an annual basis are equal to between 5 and 20 percent of U.S. GDP.

An issue in liability exposure is whether the assets of a parent entity and the sole owner need to be subject to the subsidiary's liabilities, when the subsidiary is declared insolvent and owes debt to its creditors. As a general principle of corporate law, in the United States, a parent entity and the sole owner are not liable for the acts of its subsidiaries. However, they may be liable for its subsidiaries' obligations when the law supports "piercing the corporate veil".

Some jurisdictions have rejected the United States corporate law principle. For example, the Supreme People’s Court of China has announced official rules stating that a subscriber may be declared personally liable for all debts to creditors for debts to the extent of "registered capital" that has not been fully contributed. An insolvent company's shareholder who fails to make payment during a capital call is jointly and severally liable for the company's debts to the extent of non-payment. Government regulators in China, seeking to ensure the business is sufficiently capitalized to cover possible debts, require very high registered capital requirements, so much so these have been described as a "barrier to entry" by Chinese scholars. In practice, in China this means entrepreneurs will not be able to escape personal liability for debts and may even be personally placed on a national debtor blacklist.

Provided that the parent entity or the sole owner do not maintain separate legal identities from the subsidiary (through inadequate/ undocumented transfer of funds and assets), the judgment is likely to be in favor of the creditor. In the same regard, if a subsidiary is undercapitalized from its inception, that may be grounds for piercing the corporate veil. Further, if injustice/fraud to the creditor is proven, the parent entity or the owner may be held liable to compensate the creditor. Thus, there is not one characteristic that defines the piercing of a corporate veil – a factors test is used to determine if piercing is appropriate or not.

If shares are issued "part-paid," then the shareholders are liable, when a claim is made against the capital of the company, to pay to the company the balance of the face or par value of the shares.

== History ==
By the 15th century, English law had awarded limited liability to monastic communities and trade guilds with commonly held property. In the 17th century, joint stock charters were awarded by the crown to monopolies such as the East India Company. The world's first modern limited liability law was enacted by the state of New York in 1811. In England it became more straightforward to incorporate a joint stock company following the Joint Stock Companies Act 1844, although investors in such companies carried unlimited liability until the Limited Liability Act 1855.

There was a degree of public and legislative distaste for a limitation of liability, with fears that it would cause a drop in standards of probity. The 1855 Act allowed limited liability to companies of more than 25 members (shareholders). Insurance companies were excluded from the act, though it was standard practice for insurance contracts to exclude action against individual members. Limited liability for insurance companies was allowed by the Companies Act 1862. The minimum number of members necessary for registration as a limited company was reduced to seven by the Companies Act 1856. Limited companies in England and Wales now require only one member.

Similar statutory regimes were in place in France and in the majority of the U.S. states by 1860. By the final quarter of the nineteenth century, most European countries had adopted the principle of limited liability. The development of limited liability facilitated the move to large-scale industrial enterprise, by removing the threat that an individual's total wealth would be confiscated if invested in an unsuccessful company. Large sums of personal financial capital became available, and the transferability of shares permitted a degree of business continuity not possible in other forms of enterprise.

In the UK there was initially a widespread belief that a corporation needed to demonstrate its creditworthiness by having its shares only partly paid, as where shares are partly paid, the investor would be liable for the remainder of the nominal value in case the company could not pay its debts. Shares with nominal values of up to £1,000 were therefore subscribed to with only a small payment, leaving even a limited liability investor with a potentially crushing liability and restricting investment to the very wealthy. During the Overend Gurney crisis (1866–1867) and the Long Depression (1873–1896) many companies fell into insolvency and the unpaid portion of the shares fell due. Further, the extent to which small and medium investors were excluded from the market was admitted and, from the 1880s onwards, shares were more commonly fully paid.

Although it was admitted that those who were mere investors ought not to be liable for debts arising from the management of a corporation, throughout the late nineteenth century there were still many arguments for unlimited liability for managers and directors on the model of the French société en commandite. Such liability for directors of English companies was abolished in 2006. Further, it became increasingly common from the end of the nineteenth century for shareholders to be directors, protecting themselves from liability.

In 1989, the European Union enacted its Twelfth Council Company Law Directive, requiring that member states make available legal structures for individuals to trade with limited liability. This was implemented in England and Wales in the Companies (Single Member Private Limited Companies) Regulations 1992, which allowed single-member limited-liability companies.

== Justification ==
Some argue that limited liability is related to the concept of separate legal personality bestowed on the corporate form, which is promoted as encouraging entrepreneurship by various economists, enabling large sums to be pooled towards an economically beneficial purpose.

Limited liability has been justified as promoting investment and capital formation by reassuring risk averse investors.

== Criticisms ==
An early critic of limited liability, Edward William Cox, a lifelong member of the Conservative Party, wrote in 1855:

[T]hat he who acts through an agent should be responsible for his agent's acts, and that he who shares the profits of an enterprise ought also to be subject to its losses; that there is a moral obligation, which it is the duty of the laws of a civilized nation to enforce, to pay debts, perform contracts and make reparation for wrongs. Limited liability is founded on the opposite principle and permits a man to avail himself of acts if advantageous to him, and not to be responsible for them if they should be disadvantageous; to speculate for profits without being liable for losses; to make contracts, incur debts, and commit wrongs, the law depriving the creditor, the contractor, and the injured of a remedy against the property or person of the wrongdoer, beyond the limit, however small, at which it may please him to determine his own liability.

Others argue that while some limited liability is beneficial, the privilege ought not to extend to liability in tort for environmental disasters or personal injury because this leads to excessive risk-taking and negative externalities by corporations. Others argue that limited liability should be permitted, but should be taxed more heavily to offset the harm that limited liability causes. Such taxes could be structured to generate information for regulators about how risky the activities companies are undertaking are to third parties.

The notion of corporate limited liability has met criticism from certain figures among the libertarian right. In For a New Liberty: The Libertarian Manifesto, Murray N. Rothbard approvingly quoted Robert Poole, a fellow libertarian, who stated that a "libertarian society would be a full-liability society where everyone is fully responsible for his actions and any harmful consequences they might cause."

== Maritime claims ==
The 1957 Brussels Convention and the 1976 London Convention on Limitation of Liability for Maritime Claims permit the charterer, manager, operators and salvors of a ship, and the master and members of the crew, to limit their liability for damage caused by events occurring "on board or in direct connection with the operation of the ship, or with salvage operations" and for "consequential loss resulting therefrom."

== See also ==
- Limited liability company – US form of a private limited company
- Salomon v A Salomon & Co Ltd – UK landmark company law case
- Unlimited liability company – Company where shareholders/members have unlimited legal liability
- No liability - for mining companies only
- Proprietary company – Type of business entity
