= People with Significant Control =

British corporate term

People with Significant Control (PSC) is a business and corporate term used in the United Kingdom to identify key people within a company. The term was introduced on 6 April 2016 as part of the Small Business, Enterprise and Employment Act 2015. Schedule 3 to the Act covers the details about maintenance of the PSC register.

Under UK law it is a legal obligation to register the names, date of birth, home and work addresses, manner of control and other details of PSC with the government via Companies House. Once the PSC's identity has been verified they will then be added to the public list, available on the Companies House website.

On 26 June 2017, the law was amended to remove an exemption for companies listed on markets such as the Alternative Investment Market, and to bring Scottish limited partnerships and Scottish general partnerships into scope.

== Qualifying as a PSC ==
In order to qualify as a person with significant control under UK law and government guidelines, someone needs to meet the following criteria:

- You may reside in any nation as long as you can provide official government issues photo ID and proof of address.
- You must own more than 25% of the company shares or...
- You must control more than 25% of the company's voting rights or...
- You must be directly responsible for a significant segment or activity of the company i.e. Chairman of the board, CFO, CEO, COO, Vice President etc. or...
- You must control or contribute to at least 25% of the company's finance or...
- You must have direct control and/persuasion over significant proportions of primary business activities.

A PSC may be a director, board member or registered as a PSC in their own right.

== Filing PSC information ==
New companies file a statement of initial significant control to Companies House alongside the other documents required to incorporate the company. Existing companies deliver this information annually to the public register when making a Confirmation Statement.

Companies must enter any changes to PSC information on the company’s own PSC register within 14 days. They must then file the information at Companies House within a further 14 days, where it will be entered on the public register. Companies that have elected to keep their PSC register at Companies House must file the information about any changes with Companies House within 14 days.

== Examples ==
As of January 2023, Esso UK Ltd. is listed as having one person with significant control, its American-registered owner, Exxon Mobil Corporation. Tesco plc is "exempt from keeping a PSC register as it has voting shares admitted to trading on a UK regulated market", reflecting a change in legal requirements effective from 18 June 2018.

== See also ==
- Bribery Act 2010 (United Kingdom)
- Director (business)
- Politically exposed person (PEP)
- Real party in interest
- Ultimate beneficial owner (UBO)
