= Fowler v Padget =

Fowler v Padget (1798) 7 Term Rep 509; 101 ER 1103 is an old UK insolvency law case, which concerned what amounted to an act of bankruptcy. For technical reasons, because bankruptcy itself was decriminalized and thus it was technically overruled, Lord Kenyon's common law definition of mens rea created an important precedent.

== Facts ==
Fowler claimed that Padget had unlawfully broken into his house, trespassed and converted his goods. Padget claimed that he was justified in doing so, because under the Bankrupts Act 1571 (13 Eliz. 1. c. 7), Fowler had committed an act of bankruptcy. Fowler had gone from his house in Manchester, where he worked as a trader, to London because one of his creditors' business had been failing. During the ten days of his departure, Fowler's own creditors had called upon his house, and believed Fowler to have departed for fraudulent reasons under the Bankrupts Act 1603 (1 Jas. 1. c. 15).

== Judgment ==
Lord Kenyon held that there had been no act of bankruptcy, and Fowler's intention in leaving his house was not fraudulent. Under the Act, only intent to defraud creditors would amount to an Act of bankruptcy.

This is a question of infinite importance, and therefore I wished that the parties would have consented to put it on the record, in order that it might be finally decided by the Court of dernier resort. If there had been no decision on this subject, I should have thought very little doubt could have been entertained on the construction of the Act of Parliament. Bankruptcy is considered as a crime, and the bankrupt in the old laws is called an offender: but it is a principle of natural justice, and of our law, that actus non facit reum nisi mens sit rea. The intent and the Act must both concur to constitute the crime; and by reading the word “and” for “or” in the statute of 1 Jac. 1, c. 15, which is frequently done in the construction of legal instruments where the sense requires it, all difficulty will be removed. But according to the defendant's construction of this Act, every merchant in London might become a bankrupt before to-morrow morning. If the words of the statute are to be taken in their literal sense, any person who happens to go from home only for an hour, during which time any creditor calls for payment, and is for that hour delayed, may become a bankrupt: and it would be no answer to such an argument (as was supposed at the Bar) to say that the trader left word where he was gone, because a creditor may have taken out a writ against him in one county, and if he were gone on the borders of the next county, such creditor would in fact be delayed. I do not wish to impeach the authority of Woodier's case or of that of Raikes v Poreau, because in both, the parties went abroad under circumstances that rendered it highly probable that they would not return to this country; one had committed murder, and the other was amenable to the laws of this country for a different offence. We have been pressed however with another case, that of Vernon v Hankey, tried before Mr. J. Buller: I have the greatest respect and reverence for the opinions of that learned Judge, but I rather think we have another opinion of his to set against that delivered by him in Vernon v. Hankey, where he said that this intention with which the party left his house was to decide the question, and I think that was the better opinion. The Legislature never could have meant to extend criminality to a person who leaves his house, only for the purpose of transacting his legal concerns. I would adopt any construction of the statute that the words will bear, in order to avoid such monstrous consequences as would manifestly ensue from the construction contended for by the defendant. And as this verdict was taken on the ground that the plaintiff had not committed an act of bankruptcy, I am not prepared to say that there ought to be a new trial.

Ashurst J, Grose J and Lawrence J gave concurring opinions.

== Legacy ==
Fowler was technically overruled by Robertson v Liddell. However, its reasoning lives on; Lord Kenyon's definition of mens rea of a crime as "voluntary, intentional and malicious" continued in the later 19th century to be quoted approvingly, in Irish law, and "the essence of every offense is the wrongful intent with which it is done," in American law.

== See also ==
- UK bankruptcy law
- History of bankruptcy law
