= Stewart Kyd =

Stewart Kyd (1759 – 26 January 1811) was a Scottish politician and legal writer.

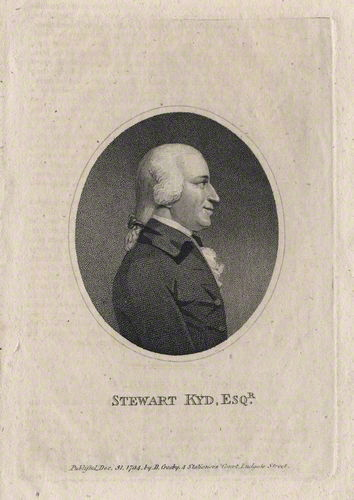
Stewart Kyd, 1794 engraving.

== Life ==
A native of Arbroath, Forfarshire, he went at the age of fourteen from Arbroath grammar school to King's College, Aberdeen. Abandoning a design of entering the church, he settled in London, and was called to the bar from the Middle Temple. He became a friend of Thomas Hardy and John Horne Tooke, whose political opinions he admired. In November 1792 he joined the Society for Constitutional Information.

On 29 May 1794 he was arrested and examined by the privy council but was soon discharged. On 4 June he was again summoned before the council, and three days later was committed to the Tower on a charge of high treason, with Hardy, Tooke, and ten others. On 25 October all the prisoners were brought up for trial before a special commission at the Old Bailey, but after the acquittal of Hardy, Tooke and John Thelwall, the attorney-general declined offering any evidence against Kyd, and he was discharged.

In June 1797 he defended Thomas Williams, a bookseller, who was indicted for blasphemy in publishing Tom Paine's The Age of Reason. His speech was printed during the same year. Kyd died in the Temple on 26 January 1811. His portrait has been engraved.

== Works ==
Besides a continuation of Comyns' Digest (London, 1792), Kyd published:

- A Treatise on the Law of Bills of Exchange and Promissory Notes. London. 1790. 3rd edition. 1795. 2nd American edition. Albany, New York. 1800.
- A Treatise on the Law of Awards. London. 1791. 2nd edition. 1799.
- A Treatise on the Law of Corporations. 2 vols. London. 1793–4.
- The Substance of the Income Act. London. 1799. Two editions.
- Arrangement under distinct Titles of all the Provisions of the several Acts of Parliament relating to the Assessed Taxes. London. 1799 (Postscript, 1801).
