= Bankruptcy Act 1705 =

Act of the Parliament of England

- Act of Parliament
- Parliament of England
- Long title: An Act to prevent Frauds frequently committed by Bankrupts.
- Citation: 4 & 5 Ann. c. 4 (Note: This is the citation in The Statutes of the Realm.); 4 Ann. c. 17 (Note: This is the citation in The Statutes at Large.)
- Territorial extent: England and Wales

Dates
- Royal assent: 19 March 1706
- Commencement: 25 October 1705 (Note: Start of session.)
- Repealed: 15 July 1867
Other legislation
Amended by	Bankrupts Act 1706; Perpetuation, etc. of Acts 1708
Repealed by	Statute Law Revision Act 1867

Status: Repealed

Text of statute as originally enacted

The Bankruptcy Act 1705 (4 & 5 Ann. c. 4) was an act of the Parliament of England.

== Provisions ==
Under the act, the Lord Chancellor was given power to discharge bankrupts, once disclosure of all assets and various procedures had been fulfilled.

Discharge from debt was introduced for those who cooperated with creditors. The discharge took effect once a bankrupt obtained a certificate of the bankruptcy commissioners providing that there has been full disclosure and adherence to their directions.

== Subsequent developments ==
The act was continued until the end of the next session of parliament 5 years after 25 April 1709 by section 4 of the Perpetuation, etc. of Acts 1708 (7 Ann. c. 25).

The whole act was repealed by section 1 of, and the schedule to, the Statute Law Revision Act 1867 (30 & 31 Vict. c. 59), which came into force on 15 July 1867.

== See also ==
- UK insolvency law
- UK bankruptcy law
- History of bankruptcy law
