= Companies Act 1862 =

Act of the Parliament of the United Kingdom

Companies Act 1862 (Note: Section 1.)
- Act of Parliament
- Parliament of the United Kingdom
- Long title: An Act for the Incorporation, Regulation, and Winding up of Trading Companies and other Associations.
- Citation: 25 & 26 Vict. c. 89
- Territorial extent: United Kingdom

Dates
- Royal assent: 7 August 1862
- Commencement: 2 November 1862 (Note: Section 2.)
- Repealed: 1 April 1909
Other legislation
Repeals/revokes	See § Repealed enactments
Amended by	Companies Act 1867; Lis Pendens Act 1867; Statute Law Revision Act 1875; Statute Law Revision and Civil Procedure Act 1881; Companies Act 1880; Companies Act 1886; Companies Act 1907
Repealed by	Companies (Consolidation) Act 1908

Status: Repealed

Text of statute as originally enacted

The Companies Act 1862 (25 & 26 Vict. c. 89) was an act of the Parliament of the United Kingdom regulating UK company law, whose descendant is the Companies Act 2006.

== Provisions ==
- s 6 'Any seven or more persons associated for any lawful purpose may, by subscribing their names to a memorandum of association, and otherwise complying with the requisitions of this Act in respect of registration, form an incorporated company, with or without limited liability.'
- s 8 'Where a company is formed on the principle of having the liability of its members limited to the amount unpaid on their shares, hereinafter referred to as a company limited by shares, the Memorandum of Association shall contain the following things' the third of which was 'objects for which the proposed company is to be established.'
- s 11 'The memorandum of association... shall, when registered, bind the company and the members thereof to the same extent as if each member had subscribed his name and affixed his seal thereto, and there were in the memorandum contained, on the part of himself, his heirs, executors and administrators, a covenant to observe all the conditions of such memorandum, subject to the provisions of this Act.'
- s 12 stated the memorandum could be altered by special resolution if the memorandum allowed itselfthat.
- s 18 dealt with the effect of incorporation.
- s 48
- s 153

Under section 167 of the Companies Act 1862, one of the functions of a liquidator was to bring criminal proceedings against directors and others who were alleged to have committed offences in relation to the company.

=== Repealed enactments ===
Section 205 of the act repealed 17 enactments, listed in part I of the third schedule to the act, with the qualification that so much of two of them as was set out in part II of that schedule was re-enacted and continued in force.

Citation	Short title	Description	Extent of repeal
21 & 22 Geo. 3. c. 46 (I)	Partnerships Act 1781	An Act to promote Trade and Manufactures by regulating and encouraging Partnerships.	The whole act.
7 & 8 Vict. c. 110	Joint Stock Companies Act 1844	An Act for the Registration, Incorporation, and Regulation of Joint Stock Companies.	The whole act.
7 & 8 Vict. c. 111	Joint Stock Companies Winding-Up Act 1844	An Act for facilitating the winding up the Affairs of Joint Stock Companies unable to meet their pecuniary Engagements.	The whole act.
7 & 8 Vict. c. 113	Joint Stock Banks Act 1844	An Act to regulate Joint Stock Banks in England.	The whole act except section 47.
8 & 9 Vict. c. 98	Joint Stock Companies (Ireland) Act 1845	An Act for facilitating the winding up the Affairs of Joint Stock Companies in Ireland unable to meet their pecuniary Engagements.	The whole act.
9 & 10 Vict. c. 28	Railway Companies Dissolution Act 1846	An Act to facilitate the Dissolution of certain Railway Companies.	The whole act.
9 & 10 Vict. c. 75	Joint Stock Banks (Scotland and Ireland) Act 1846	An Act to regulate Joint Stock Banks in Scotland and Ireland.	The whole act.
10 & 11 Vict. c. 78	Joint Stock Companies Act 1847	An Act to amend an Act for the Registration, Incorporation, and Regulation of Joint Stock Companies.	The whole act.
11 & 12 Vict. c. 45	Joint Stock Companies Act 1848	An Act to amend the Acts for facilitating the winding up the Affairs of Joint Stock Companies unable to meet their pecuniary Engagements, and also to facilitate the Dissolution and winding up of Joint Stock Companies and other Partnerships.	The whole act.
12 & 13 Vict. c. 108	Joint Stock Companies Act 1849	An Act to amend the Joint Stock Companies Winding-up Act, 1848.	The whole act.
19 & 20 Vict. c. 47	Joint Stock Companies Act 1856	An Act for the Incorporation and Regulation of Joint Stock Companies and other Associations.	The whole act.
20 & 21 Vict. c. 14	Joint Stock Companies Act 1857	An Act to amend the Joint Stock Companies Act, 1856.	The whole act.
20 & 21 Vict. c. 49	Joint Stock Banking Companies Act 1857	An Act to amend the Law relating to Banking Companies.	The whole act except part of section 12.
20 & 21 Vict. c. 78	Joint Stock Companies Winding-up Amendment Act 1857	An Act to amend the Act Seven and Eight Victoria, Chapter One hundred and eleven, for facilitating the winding up the Affairs of Joint Stock Companies unable to meet their pecuniary Engagements, and also the Joint Stock Companies Winding-up Acts, 1848 and 1849.	The whole act.
20 & 21 Vict. c. 80	Joint Stock Companies Act Amendment Act 1857	An Act to amend the Joint Stock Companies Act, 1856.	The whole act.
21 & 22 Vict. c. 60	Joint Stock Companies Amendment Act 1858	An Act to amend the Joint Stock Companies Acts, 1856 and 1857, and the Joint Stock Banking Companies Act, 1857.	The whole act.
21 & 22 Vict. c. 91	Joint Stock Banks Act 1858	An Act to enable Joint Stock Banking Companies to be formed on the Principle of Limited Liability.	The whole act.

== Subsequent developments ==
The whole act was repealed by section 28 of, and part I of the sixth schedule to, the Companies (Consolidation) Act 1908 (8 Edw. 7. c. 69), which came into force on 1 April 1909.

== Cases decided under the 1862 act ==
- In re Wiltshire Iron Co (1868) LR 3 Ch App 443
- Guinness v Land Corporation of Ireland (1882) 22 Ch 349
- Salomon v A Salomon & Co Ltd [1897] AC 22
- Ashbury Railway Carriage & Iron Co Ltd v Riche (1875) LR 7 HL 653

== In popular culture ==
In the song "Some seven men form an association" in Gilbert and Sullivan's Utopia, Limited, King Paramount reforms the island of Utopia into a limited-liability company under the provisions of the Companies Act. However, in the operetta, it is instead referred to as "the Joint Stock Companies Act of sixty-two", perhaps to allude to the Joint Stock Companies Act 1844 (7 & 8 Vict. c. 110), which was referenced in their previous opera The Gondoliers.

== See also ==
- Companies Act
- UK company law
- History of companies
- Limited Liability Act 1855
- Joint Stock Companies Act 1856
- Companies (Consolidation) Act 1908
- Companies Act 1929
- Companies Act 1948
- Companies Act 1985
- Companies Act 2006

== Bibliography ==
- Pulbrook, Anthony (1865). The Companies Act, 1862, with analytical references and copious index. London: Effingham Wilson.
- Micklethwait, John; Wooldridge, Adrian (2003). The company: a short history of a revolutionary idea. New York: Modern Library.
