= Public service law =

Public service law may refer to:

- United Kingdom public service law
- Public service law in the United States
- Public Service Law, one of the chapters of the Consolidated Laws of New York
