= Joint Stock Companies Act 1844 =

Act of the Parliament of the United Kingdom

- Act of Parliament
- Parliament of the United Kingdom
- Long title: An Act for the Registration, Incorporation, and Regulation of Joint Stock Companies.
- Citation: 7 & 8 Vict. c. 110
- Territorial extent: England and Wales; Ireland; (Note: Section 2.)

Dates
- Royal assent: 5 September 1844
- Commencement: 5 September 1844 (in part); 1 November 1844 (in full); (Note: Section 1.)
- Repealed: 2 November 1862
Other legislation
Amended by	Joint Stock Companies Act 1847; Joint Stock Companies Act 1856
Repealed by	Companies Act 1862
Relates to	Joint Stock Companies Winding-Up Act 1844; Companies Clauses Consolidation Act 1845; Limited Liability Act 1855

Status: Repealed

Text of statute as originally enacted

The Joint Stock Companies Act 1844 (7 & 8 Vict. c. 110) was an act of the Parliament of the United Kingdom that expanded access to the incorporation of joint-stock companies.

Before the act, incorporation was possible only by royal charter or private act and was limited owing to Parliament's protection of the privileges and advantages thereby granted. As a result, many businesses came to be operated as unincorporated associations, with possibly thousands of members. Any consequent litigation had to be carried out in the joint names of all the members and was almost impossibly cumbersome. Parliament would sometimes grant a private act to allow an individual to represent the whole in legal proceedings, but that was a narrow and necessarily costly expedient, which was allowed only to established companies.

The act created the Registrar of Joint Stock Companies, which was empowered to register companies by a two-stage process. The first, provisional, stage cost £5 (equivalent to £549 in 2025) and did not confer corporate status, which arose after completing the second stage for another £5.

However, there was still no limited liability, and company members could still be held responsible for unlimited losses by the company. Limited liability was subsequently introduced by the Limited Liability Act 1855 (18 & 19 Vict. c. 133).

== Subsequent developments ==
The system of registration was revised and the whole act was repealed by section 107 of the Joint Stock Companies Act 1856 (19 & 20 Vict. c. 47), which came into force on 14 July 1856. The aim of the act was to place business and economy on a surer foundation and to increase public confidence in the honesty of business.

The repeal of the act by the Joint Stock Companies Act 1856 (19 & 20 Vict. c. 47) was deemed as unrepealed "as to any Company completely registered which has not obtained Registration" of the 1856 act by section 23 of the Joint Stock Companies Act 1857 (20 & 21 Vict. c. 14).

The whole act was repealed by section 205 of, and the first part of the third schedule to, the Companies Act 1862 (25 & 26 Vict. c. 89), which came into force on 2 November 1862.

== See also ==
- Bubble Act 1720
- Companies Act
- Limited Liability Act 1855
- Joint Stock Companies Act 1856
- Utopia, Limited

== Bibliography ==
- Harris, R. (2000). Industrialising English Law: Entrepreneurship and Business Organisation, 1720–1844. Cambridge, UK: Cambridge University Press. ISBN 0-521-66275-3.
- Hunt, B.C. (1936). The Development of the Business Corporation in England, 1800–1867. Cambridge, MA: Harvard University Press.
- Mayson, S.W; et al. (2005). Mayson, French & Ryan on Company Law. London: Oxford University Press. ISBN 0-19-928531-4.
