= Limited Liability Act 1855 =

Act of the Parliament of the United Kingdom

Limited Liability Act 1855 (Note: Section 19.)
- Act of Parliament
- Parliament of the United Kingdom
- Long title: An Act for limiting the Liability of Members of certain Joint Stock Companies.
- Citation: 18 & 19 Vict. c. 133
- Territorial extent: England and Wales; Ireland; (Note: Section 18.)

Dates
- Royal assent: 14 August 1855
- Commencement: 14 August 1855 (Note: The Acts of Parliament (Commencement) Act 1793.)
- Repealed: 11 August 1875
Other legislation
Amended by	Joint Stock Companies Act 1856
Repealed by	Statute Law Revision Act 1875

Status: Repealed

Text of statute as originally enacted

The Limited Liability Act 1855 (18 & 19 Vict. c. 133) was an act of the Parliament of the United Kingdom that first expressly allowed limited liability for corporations that could be established by the general public in England and Wales as well as Ireland. The Act did not apply to Scotland, where the limited liability of shareholders for the debts company debts had been recognised since the mid-18th century with the decision in the case of Stevenson v McNair. Although the validity of the decision in that case had come to be doubted by the mid-19th century, the Joint Stock Companies Act 1856 (19 & 20 Vict. c. 47), which applied across the UK, put the matter beyond doubt by settling that Scottish 'companies' could be possessed of both separate legal personality and limited liability.

== Overview ==
Under the act, shareholders were still liable directly to creditors for the unpaid portion of their shares. The modern principle that shareholders are liable to the corporation was introduced by the Joint Stock Companies Act 1844 (7 & 8 Vict. c. 110).

The act allowed limited liability to companies of more than 25 members (shareholders). Insurance companies were excluded from the act, though it was standard practice for insurance contracts to exclude action against individual members. Limited liability for insurance companies was allowed by the Companies Act 1862 (25 & 26 Vict. c. 89).

== Passage ==
In the House of Lords, a considerable amount of opposition existed to the idea that companies should have the advantage of limited liability. Many peers objected to what appeared to them as the government rushing through the bill as if its urgency was connected to the effort in the Crimean War. Earl Grey was one of them:

It proposes to depart from the old-established maxim that all the partners are individually liable for the whole of the debts of the concern.

Earl Granville replied to those concerns:

it appears to me that a time of war is the very time at which you ought to free commerce from restrictions, and, therefore, that the reason he mentioned is an especial reason for pressing on the Bill instead of retarding it.

== Subsequent developments ==
The system of registration was revised and the whole act was repealed by section 107 of the Joint Stock Companies Act 1856 (19 & 20 Vict. c. 47), which came into force on 14 July 1856. The aim of the act was to place business and economy on a surer foundation and to increase public confidence in the honesty of business.

The repeal of the act by the Joint Stock Companies Act 1856 (19 & 20 Vict. c. 47) was deemed as unrepealed "as to any Company completely registered which has not obtained Registration" of the 1856 act by section 23 of the Joint Stock Companies Act 1857 (20 & 21 Vict. c. 14).

The whole act was repealed by section 1 of, and the schedule to, the Statute Law Revision Act 1875 (38 & 39 Vict. c. 66), which came into force on 11 August 1875.

== See also ==
- Companies Act
- Companies Act 2006
- Joint Stock Companies Act 1844
- Joint Stock Companies Act 1856
- Utopia, Limited

== Bibliography ==
- Gibbons, David. The Limited Liability Act, 18th & 19th Victoria, Cap. 133. John Weale. High Holborn, London. 1855.
- Paterson, W (ed). "Limited Liability Act". The Practical Statutes of the Session 1855. John Crockford. Essex Street, Strand, London. Pages 556 to 570.
- Harris, R. (2000). Industrialising English Law: Entrepreneurship and Business Organisation, 1720–1844. Cambridge, UK: Cambridge University Press. ISBN 0-521-66275-3.
- Hunt, B.C. (1936). The Development of the Business Corporation in England, 1800–1867. Cambridge, MA: Harvard University Press.
- Mayson, S.W; et al. (2005). Mayson, French & Ryan on Company Law. London: Oxford University Press. ISBN 0-19-928531-4.
- Amsler, C.F.; et al. (1981). "Thoughts of some British economists on early limited liability and corporate legislation". History of Political Economy. 13 (4): 774–93. doi:10.1215/00182702-13-4-774.
