= Joint Stock Companies Act 1856 =

Act of the Parliament of the United Kingdom

Joint Stock Companies Act 1856 (Note: Section 1.)
- Act of Parliament
- Parliament of the United Kingdom
- Long title: An Act for the Incorporation and Regulation of Joint Stock Companies and other Associations.
- Citation: 19 & 20 Vict. c. 47
- Introduced by: Robert Lowe (Commons)
- Territorial extent: United Kingdom

Dates
- Royal assent: 14 July 1856
- Commencement: 14 July 1856 (Note: The Acts of Parliament (Commencement) Act 1793.)
- Repealed: 2 November 1862
Other legislation
Repeals/revokes	Joint Stock Companies Act 1844; Joint Stock Companies Winding-Up Act 1844; Joint Stock Companies (Ireland) Act 1845; Joint Stock Companies Act 1847; Joint Stock Companies Act 1848; Joint Stock Companies Act 1849; Limited Liability Act 1855; See § Repealed enactments
Amended by	Joint Stock Companies Act 1857
Repealed by	Companies Act 1862
Relates to	Companies Act 2006

Status: Repealed

Text of statute as originally enacted

The Joint Stock Companies Act 1856 (19 & 20 Vict. c. 47) was an act of the Parliament of the United Kingdom.

It was a consolidating statute that was recognised as the founding piece of modern United Kingdom company law.

== Debate ==
The Joint Stock Companies Bill was introduced to Parliament by the Vice President of the Board of Trade, Robert Lowe. In doing so, he proclaimed the right of every citizen to have freedom of contract and, with it, to obtain limited liability for operating a business. Companies had until recently been prohibited, as a result of the Bubble Act and the stock market panics of the early 18th century. There was still a lot of suspicion of companies, but Lowe rejected the idea that a limited company is inherently subject to fraud and proposed the suffix "Ltd" to make businesses aware of limited liability.

A company formed on the principle of limited liability carries on the face of it something like prudence and caution. Its shareholders seem to say, "we have entered into a partnership, but it is impossible to tell what may happen, and since the company may fail, we will not risk all we possess in the undertaking....
My object at present is not to urge the adoption of limited liability. I am arguing in favour of human liberty – that people may be permitted to deal how and with whom they choose without the officious interference of the state; and my opinion will not be shaken even though very few limited companies be established. Every man has a right to choose for himself between the two principles, and it is ill advised legislation which steps in between him and the exercise of that right. It is right the experiment should be tried; and, in my judgment, the principle we should adopt is this, – not to throw the slightest obstacle in the way of limited companies being formed – because the effect of that would be to arrest ninety-nine good schemes in order that the bad hundredth might be prevented; but to allow them all to come into existence, and when difficulties arise, to arm the courts of justice with sufficient powers to check extravagance or roguery in the management of companies, and to save them from the wreck in which they may be involved.

The third reading of the bill took place on 2 June 1856 and passed easily.

== Provisions ==
Unlike other acts of Parliament that preceded it, the act provided a simple administrative procedure by which any group of seven people could register a limited liability company for themselves. Companies involved in banking and insurance were explicitly excluded from the provisions of the act.

=== Repealed enactments ===
Section 107 of the act repealed 3 enactments, listed in that section. The repeal did not take effect with respect to any company completely registered under the Joint Stock Companies Act 1844 (7 & 8 Vict. c. 110) until that company had obtained registration under the act.

Citation	Short title	Description	Extent of repeal
7 & 8 Vict. c. 110	Joint Stock Companies Act 1844	An Act for the Registration, Incorporation, and Regulation of Joint Stock Companies.	The whole act.
10 & 11 Vict. c. 78	Joint Stock Companies Act 1847	An Act to amend an Act for the Registration, Incorporation, and Regulation of Joint Stock Companies.	The whole act.
18 & 19 Vict. c. 133	Limited Liability Act 1855	An Act for limiting the Liability of Members of certain Joint Stock Companies.	The whole act.

== Subsequent developments ==
The act was amended by the Joint Stock Companies Act 1857 (20 & 21 Vict. c. 14). Section 23 of the 1857 act deemed the following enactments as unrepealed "as to any Company completely registered which has not obtained Registration" of the 1856 act.

- The Joint Stock Companies Act 1844 (7 & 8 Vict. c. 110)
- The Joint Stock Companies Act 1847 (10 & 11 Vict. c. 78)
- The Limited Liability Act 1855 (18 & 19 Vict. c. 133)

The whole act was repealed by section 205 of, and the first part of the third schedule to, the Companies Act 1862 (25 & 26 Vict. c. 89), which came into force on 2 November 1862.

== See also ==
- Companies Act
- Joint Stock Companies Act 1844
- Limited Liability Act 1855

== Bibliography ==
- W Paterson (ed). "Joint Stock Companies Act". The Practical Statutes of the Session 1856. London. 1856. Pages 61 to 119.
- Welsby and Beavan. Chitty's Collection of Statutes. Third Edition. 1865. Volume 1. Title "Companies (Joint Stock). Pages 684 to 717.
- Charles Wordsworth. The Joint Stock Companies Act, 1856. Fourth Edition. Shaw and Sons. London. 1856.
- Charles Wordsworth. The New Joint Stock Company Law. Shaw and Sons. London. 1859. Pages 1 to 70.
- Henry Thring. The Joint Stock Companies Act, 1856. London. 1856.
- William George Harrison and George A Cape. The Joint Stock Companies Act, 1856. London. 1856. Bibliography. Catalogue.
- Edward W Cox. "The Joint Stock Companies Act, 1856". The New Law and Practice of Joint Stock Companies. Fourth Edition. London. 1857. Pages 1 to 83.
- Harris, R. (2000). Industrialising English Law: Entrepreneurship and Business Organisation, 1720–1844. Cambridge, UK: Cambridge University Press. ISBN 0-521-66275-3.
- Hunt, B.C. (1936). The Development of the Business Corporation in England, 1800–1867. Cambridge, MA: Harvard University Press.
- Mayson, S.W; et al. (2005). Mayson, French & Ryan on Company Law. London: Oxford University Press. ISBN 0-19-928531-4.
