= List of United States Supreme Court cases, volume 288 =

Supreme Court of the United States
- Interactive map of Supreme Court of the United States
- 38°53′26″N 77°00′16″W
- Established: March 4, 1789; 237 years ago
- Location: Washington, D.C.
- Coordinates: 38°53′26″N 77°00′16″W
- Composition method: Presidential nomination with Senate confirmation
- Authorised by: Constitution of the United States, Art. III, § 1
- Judge term length: life tenure, subject to impeachment and removal
- Number of positions: 9 (by statute)
- Website: supremecourt.gov

This is a list of cases reported in volume 288 of United States Reports, decided by the Supreme Court of the United States in 1933.

== Justices of the Supreme Court at the time of volume 288 U.S. ==
The Supreme Court is established by Article III, Section 1 of the Constitution of the United States, which says: "The judicial Power of the United States, shall be vested in one supreme Court . . .". The size of the Court is not specified; the Constitution leaves it to Congress to set the number of justices. Under the Judiciary Act of 1789 Congress originally fixed the number of justices at six (one chief justice and five associate justices). Since 1789 Congress has varied the size of the Court from six to seven, nine, ten, and back to nine justices (always including one chief justice).

When the cases in volume 288 were decided the Court comprised the following nine members:

Portrait	Justice	Office	Home State	Succeeded	Date confirmed by the Senate (Vote)	Tenure on Supreme Court
	Charles Evans Hughes	Chief Justice	New York	William Howard Taft	February 13, 1930 (52–26)	February 24, 1930 – June 30, 1941 (Retired)
	Willis Van Devanter	Associate Justice	Wyoming	Edward Douglass White (as Associate Justice)	December 15, 1910 (Acclamation)	January 3, 1911 – June 2, 1937 (Retired)
	James Clark McReynolds	Associate Justice	Tennessee	Horace Harmon Lurton	August 29, 1914 (44–6)	October 12, 1914 – January 31, 1941 (Retired)
	Louis Brandeis	Associate Justice	Massachusetts	Joseph Rucker Lamar	June 1, 1916 (47–22)	June 5, 1916 – February 13, 1939 (Retired)
	George Sutherland	Associate Justice	Utah	John Hessin Clarke	September 5, 1922 (Acclamation)	October 2, 1922 – January 17, 1938 (Retired)
	Pierce Butler	Associate Justice	Minnesota	William R. Day	December 21, 1922 (61–8)	January 2, 1923 – November 16, 1939 (Died)
	Harlan F. Stone	Associate Justice	New York	Joseph McKenna	February 5, 1925 (71–6)	March 2, 1925 – July 2, 1941 (Continued as chief justice)
	Owen Roberts	Associate Justice	Pennsylvania	Edward Terry Sanford	May 20, 1930 (Acclamation)	June 2, 1930 – July 31, 1945 (Resigned)
	Benjamin N. Cardozo	Associate Justice	New York	Oliver Wendell Holmes Jr.	February 24, 1932 (Acclamation)	March 14, 1932 – July 9, 1938 (Died)

== Notable Case in 288 U.S. ==
=== Louis K. Liggett Company v. Lee ===
In Louis K. Liggett Company v. Lee, 288 U.S. 517 (1933), the Supreme Court held § 5 of the Florida Act, which increased taxes if stores were present in more than one county, was unreasonable and arbitrary and violated the equal protection clause. Justice Brandeis dissented; he agreed with the race to the bottom theory of corporate law, proposed by Adolf Berle and Gardiner Means in The Modern Corporation and Private Property (1932), that state corporate law, and lack of federal standards, enabled a race to the bottom in corporate law rules, or one of "laxity". Brandeis also expounded on evidence that the Great Depression was caused by disparities of income and wealth brought about by the corporation, which he likened to Frankenstein's monster.

== Federal court system ==
Under the Judiciary Act of 1789 the federal court structure at the time comprised District Courts, which had general trial jurisdiction; Circuit Courts, which had mixed trial and appellate (from the US District Courts) jurisdiction; and the United States Supreme Court, which had appellate jurisdiction over the federal District and Circuit courts—and for certain issues over state courts. The Supreme Court also had limited original jurisdiction (i.e., in which cases could be filed directly with the Supreme Court without first having been heard by a lower federal or state court). There were one or more federal District Courts and/or Circuit Courts in each state, territory, or other geographical region.

The Judiciary Act of 1891 created the United States Courts of Appeals and reassigned the jurisdiction of most routine appeals from the district and circuit courts to these appellate courts. The Act created nine new courts that were originally known as the "United States Circuit Courts of Appeals." The new courts had jurisdiction over most appeals of lower court decisions. The Supreme Court could review either legal issues that a court of appeals certified or decisions of court of appeals by writ of certiorari. On January 1, 1912, the effective date of the Judicial Code of 1911, the old Circuit Courts were abolished, with their remaining trial court jurisdiction transferred to the U.S. District Courts.

== List of cases in volume 288 U.S. ==
Case name	Citation	Opinion of the Court	Vote	Concurring opinion or statement	Dissenting opinion or statement	Procedural jurisdiction	Result
United States v. Chicago North Shore and Milwaukee Railroad Company	288 U.S. 1 (1933)	Roberts	9-0	none	none	appeal from the United States District Court for the Northern District of Illinois (N.D. Ill.)	judgment affirmed
Interstate Commerce Commission v. Oregon-Washington Railroad and Navigation Company	288 U.S. 14 (1933)	Roberts	6-3	none	Cardozo (opinion; joined by Brandeis and Stone)	appeal from the United States District Court for the District of Oregon (D. Or.)	decree affirmed
Hawks v. Hamill	288 U.S. 52 (1933)	Cardozo	9-0	none	none	certiorari to the United States Court of Appeals for the Tenth Circuit (10th Cir.)	decree reversed
United States v. Memphis Cotton Oil Company	288 U.S. 62 (1933)	Cardozo	9-0	none	none	certiorari to the United States Court of Claims (Ct. Cl.)	judgment affirmed
United States v. Henry Prentiss and Company	288 U.S. 73 (1933)	Cardozo	9-0	none	none	certiorari to the United States Court of Appeals for the Second Circuit (2d Cir.)	judgment reversed, and cause remanded
United States v. Factors and Finance Company	288 U.S. 89 (1933)	Cardozo	9-0	none	none	certiorari to the United States Court of Claims (Ct. Cl.)	judgment affirmed
Wilbur, Secretary of the Interior v. United States ex rel. Chestatee Pyrites and Chemical Corporation	288 U.S. 97 (1933)	McReynolds	9-0	none	none	certiorari to the United States Court of Appeals for the District of Columbia (D.C. Cir.)	judgment affirmed
Cook v. United States	288 U.S. 102 (1933)	Brandeis	6-2[a]	none	Sutherland and Butler (joint short statement)	certiorari to the United States Court of Appeals for the First Circuit (1st Cir.)	decree reversed
Rogers v. Guaranty Trust Company of New York	288 U.S. 123 (1933)	Butler	5-3[b]	none	Stone (opinion; with which Brandeis concurred, and Cardozo agreed); Cardozo (opinion)	certiorari to the United States Court of Appeals for the Second Circuit (2d Cir.)	judgment reversed, and cause remanded
Atlantic City Electric Company v. Commissioner of Internal Revenue	288 U.S. 152 (1933)	Hughes	9-0	none	none	certiorari to the United States Court of Appeals for the Second Circuit (2d Cir.)	judgment affirmed
Burnet, Commissioner of Internal Revenue v. Huff	288 U.S. 156 (1933)	Hughes	9-0	none	none	certiorari to the United States Court of Appeals for the Fifth Circuit (5th Cir.)	judgment reversed
Voehl v. Indemnity Insurance Company of North America	288 U.S. 162 (1933)	Hughes	9-0	none	none	certiorari to the United States Court of Appeals for the District of Columbia (D.C. Cir.)	decree affirmed
George A. Ohl and Company v. A.L. Smith Iron Works	288 U.S. 170 (1933)	Hughes	9-0	none	none	certiorari to the United States Court of Appeals for the First Circuit (1st Cir.)	judgments reversed, and causes remanded
Broad River Power Company v. Query	288 U.S. 178 (1933)	Hughes	9-0	none	none	appeals from the United States District Court for the Eastern District of South Carolina (E.D.S.C.)	decrees affirmed
Union Bank and Trust Company v. Phelps	288 U.S. 181 (1933)	McReynolds	9-0	none	none	certiorari to the Alabama Supreme Court (Ala.)	judgment affirmed
Dickson v. Uhlmann Grain Company	288 U.S. 188 (1933)	Brandeis	6-3	none	Butler (opinion; joined by Stone and Cardozo)	certiorari to the United States Court of Appeals for the Eighth Circuit (8th Cir.)	judgment reversed
Miller v. Aderhold	288 U.S. 206 (1933)	Sutherland	9-0	none	none	certiorari to the United States Court of Appeals for the Fifth Circuit (5th Cir.)	judgment affirmed
Federal Trade Commission v. Royal Milling Company	288 U.S. 212 (1933)	Sutherland	7-2	none	McReynolds and Roberts (without opinions)	certiorari to the United States Court of Appeals for the Sixth Circuit (6th Cir.)	decree reversed
Anglo-Chilean Nitrate Sales Corporation v. Alabama	288 U.S. 218 (1933)	Butler	6-3	none	Cardozo (opinion; joined by Brandeis and Stone)	appeal from the Alabama Supreme Court (Ala.)	judgment reversed
New York Central Railroad Company v. The Talisman	288 U.S. 239 (1933)	Butler	9-0	none	none	certiorari to the United States Court of Appeals for the Second Circuit (2d Cir.)	judgment reversed
United States v. Acme Operating Corporation	288 U.S. 243 (1933)	Stone	9-0	none	none	certiorari to the United States Court of Claims (Ct. Cl.)	judgment reversed
Nashville, Chattanooga and St. Louis Railway Company v. Wallace, Comptroller of the Treasury of Tennessee	288 U.S. 249 (1933)	Stone	9-0	none	none	appeal from the Tennessee Supreme Court (Tenn.)	judgment affirmed
Massachusetts Mutual Life Insurance Company v. United States	288 U.S. 269 (1933)	Roberts	9-0	none	none	certiorari to the United States Court of Claims (Ct. Cl.)	judgment affirmed
Rocco v. Lehigh Valley Railroad Company	288 U.S. 275 (1933)	Roberts	7-2	none	McReynolds and Butler (without opinions)	certiorari to the New York Supreme Court (N.Y. Sup. Ct.)	judgment reversed, and cause remanded
Burnet, Commissioner of Internal Revenue v. Guggenheim	288 U.S. 280 (1933)	Cardozo	6-2[c]	none	Sutherland and Butler (joint brief statement)	certiorari to the United States Court of Appeals for the Second Circuit (2d Cir.)	judgment reversed
New York v. Maclay	288 U.S. 290 (1933)	Cardozo	9-0	none	none	certiorari to the United States Court of Appeals for the Second Circuit (2d Cir.)	judgment affirmed
Norwegian Nitrogen Products Company v. United States	288 U.S. 294 (1933)	Cardozo	8-1	none	McReynolds (without opinion)	certiorari to the United States Court of Customs and Patent Appeals (C.C.P.A.)	judgment affirmed
Indian Territory Illuminating Oil Company v. Board of Equalization of Tulsa County, Oklahoma	288 U.S. 325 (1933)	Hughes	9-0	none	none	certiorari to the Oklahoma Supreme Court (Okla.)	judgments affirmed
New York v. Irving Trust Company	288 U.S. 329 (1933)	McReynolds	9-0	none	none	certiorari to the United States Court of Appeals for the Second Circuit (2d Cir.)	judgment affirmed
Pennsylvania Railroad Company v. Chamberlain	288 U.S. 333 (1933)	Sutherland	9-0	Stone and Cardozo (without opinions)	none	certiorari to the United States Court of Appeals for the Second Circuit (2d Cir.)	judgment reversed
Appalachian Coals, Inc. v. United States	288 U.S. 344 (1933)	Hughes	8-1	none	McReynolds (without opinion)	appeal from the United States District Court for the Western District of Virginia (W.D. Va.)	judgment reversed, and cause remanded
Burnet, Commissioner of Internal Revenue v. Brooks	288 U.S. 378 (1933)	Hughes	8-1	none	Butler (brief statement)	certiorari to the United States Court of Appeals for the Second Circuit (2d Cir.)	judgment is reversed, and cause remanded
Burnet, Commissioner of Internal Revenue v. Savings and Loan Building Corporation	288 U.S. 406 (1933)	McReynolds	9-0	none	none	certiorari to the United States Court of Appeals for the Second Circuit (2d Cir.)	judgment reversed
Arthur C. Harvey Company v. Malley	288 U.S. 415 (1933)	McReynolds	9-0	none	none	certiorari to the United States Court of Appeals for the First Circuit (1st Cir.)	judgment affirmed
McDonnell v. United States	288 U.S. 420 (1933)	Brandeis	9-0	none	none	certiorari to the United States Court of Claims (Ct. Cl.)	judgment affirmed
Pacific Coast Steel Company v. McLaughlin	288 U.S. 426 (1933)	Brandeis	9-0	none	none	certiorari to the United States Court of Appeals for the Ninth Circuit (9th Cir.)	judgment affirmed
Spicer v. Smith, Special Deputy Banking Commissioner	288 U.S. 430 (1933)	Butler	9-0	none	none	certiorari to the Kentucky Court of Appeals (Ky.)	judgment affirmed
Porter v. Commissioner of Internal Revenue	288 U.S. 436 (1933)	Butler	9-0	Cardozo (without opinion)	none	certiorari to the United States Court of Appeals for the Second Circuit (2d Cir.)	judgment affirmed
Vancouver Steamship Company v. Rice	288 U.S. 445 (1933)	Butler	9-0	none	none	certiorari to the United States Court of Appeals for the Ninth Circuit (9th Cir.)	decree affirmed
Baltimore and Ohio Railroad Company v. Brady	288 U.S. 448 (1933)	Butler	9-0	none	none	certiorari to the United States Court of Appeals for the Fourth Circuit (4th Cir.)	judgment reversed
United States v. Dakota-Montana Oil Company	288 U.S. 459 (1933)	Stone	9-0	none	none	certiorari to the United States Court of Claims (Ct. Cl.)	judgment reversed
Petroleum Exploration v. Burnet, Commissioner of Internal Revenue	288 U.S. 467 (1933)	Stone	9-0	none	none	certiorari to the United States Court of Appeals for the Fourth Circuit (4th Cir.)	judgment affirmed
Central Transfer Company v. Terminal Railroad Association of St. Louis	288 U.S. 469 (1933)	Stone	9-0	none	none	certiorari to the United States Court of Appeals for the Eighth Circuit (8th Cir.)	judgment affirmed
Porto Rico (sic) v. Russell and Company	288 U.S. 476 (1933)	Stone	9-0	none	none	certiorari to the United States Court of Appeals for the First Circuit (1st Cir.)	judgment reversed, and cause remanded
Munroe v. Raphael	288 U.S. 485 (1933)	Roberts	9-0	none	none	certiorari to the United States Court of Appeals for the First Circuit (1st Cir.)	judgment reversed
United States v. Northern Pacific Railroad Company	288 U.S. 490 (1933)	Roberts	9-0	none	none	appeal from the United States District Court for the District of Minnesota (D. Minn.)	reversed
Heiner, Collector of Internal Revenue v. Diamond Alkali Company	288 U.S. 502 (1933)	Roberts	9-0	none	none	certiorari to the United States Court of Appeals for the Third Circuit (3d Cir.)	judgments reversed, and cases remanded
Burnet, Commissioner of Internal Revenue v. A.T. Jergins Trust	288 U.S. 508 (1933)	Roberts	9-0	none	none	certiorari to the United States Court of Appeals for the Ninth Circuit (9th Cir.)	judgment reversed, and cause remanded
Louis K. Liggett Company v. Lee	288 U.S. 517 (1933)	Roberts	6-3	none	Brandeis (opinion, dissenting in part); Cardozo (opinion, dissenting in part; with which Stone concurred)	appeal from the Florida Supreme Court (Fla.)	judgment reversed, and cause remanded

[a] VanDevanter took no part in the case
[b] Roberts took no part in the case
[c] Hughes took no part in the case
