= Incorporation (business) =

Legal process to create a new corporation

Incorporation is the formation of a new corporate body. The body may be a business corporation, a nonprofit organization, a sports club, or similar. The term is also applied in local government to the formation of a new city or town and this is called a municipal corporation.

== Legal benefits ==
There are a number of legal benefits which may arise with incorporation.

One significant legal benefit is the protection of personal assets against the claims of creditors and lawsuits. Sole proprietors and general partners are personally and jointly responsible for all of the legal liability of a business such as loans, accounts payable, and legal judgments. In a corporation, however, shareholders, directors, and officers typically are not liable for the company's debts and obligations. Their liability is limited to the amount they have invested in the corporation. For example, if a shareholder purchased $100 in stock, no more than $100 can be lost. On the other hand, a corporation (Corp.) or a limited liability company (LLC) may hold assets such as real estate, cars, or boats. If a shareholder is personally involved in a lawsuit or bankruptcy, these corporate assets are protected. A creditor of a shareholder cannot seize the assets of the company. However, the creditor may be able to seize ownership shares in the corporation, as they are considered a personal asset.

In the United States of America, corporations can sometimes be taxed at a lower rate than individuals. Also, corporations can own shares in other corporations and receive corporate dividends 80% tax-free. There are no limits on the amount of losses a corporation may carry forward to subsequent tax years. A sole proprietorship, on the other hand, cannot claim a capital loss greater than $3,000 unless the owner has offsetting capital gains.

A corporation is capable of continuing indefinitely. Its existence is not affected by the death of shareholders, directors, or officers of the corporation. Ownership in a Corp. or LLC is easily transferable to others, either in whole or in part.

== In the United States of America ==
Specific incorporation requirements in the United States differ on a state by state basis. However, there are common pieces of information that states require to be included in the certificate of incorporation.

- Business purpose
- Corporation name
- Registered agent
- Inc.
- Share par value
- Number of authorized shares of stock
- Directors
- Preferred shares
- Officers
- Legal address

A business purpose describes the incorporated tasks a company has to do, or provide. The purpose can be general, indicating that the budding company has been formed to carry out "all lawful business" in the region. Alternatively, the purpose can be specific, furnishing a more detailed explanation of the products and/or services to be offered by their company.

The chosen name should be followed with a corporate identifier such as "Corp.", "Inc.", or "Co.". A preliminary name availability search is advisable prior to the submission of the Articles of Incorporation. In the case of online incorporation, the state will have the final say with regards to the name chosen for the company. The name should not deceive or mislead consumers.

Registered agents are people or entities responsible for receiving all legal and tax documentation on behalf of the corporation.

Share per value refers to the stated minimum value and generally doesn't correspond to the actual share value. In reality, the value of a share is based on its fair market value or the amount a buyer is willing to pay. An Inc. stipulates the exact number of shares the corporation is willing to authorize. It is mandatory for every corporation to have stock. If the corporation is willing to permit both preferred as well as common shares of stock, then this should have a mention in the articles of incorporation, along with the voting rights information. Generally, preferred shares provide their shareholders with preferential payments of distributions of assets or dividends in case the company shuts down its operations. Many small business owners only issue shares of common stock.

Some state laws are particularly corporate friendly. For example, Delaware corporations are not required to report the names of owners or shareholders. However, the state does require an annual report that lists the names of current directors and officers.

=== Legal history of incorporation in the United States ===
Legal opinion on corporations has evolved significantly throughout history, and Supreme Court cases provide a means to observe this evolution. While these cases may seem arbitrary and decontextualized when examined individually, when viewed successively and within historical context, a narrative emerges that offers an explanation for why such views are upheld.

==== Trustees of Dartmouth College v. Woodward, 1819 ====
In 1816, the New Hampshire state legislature passed a bill intended to turn privately owned Dartmouth College into a publicly owned university with a board of trustees appointed by the governor. The board filed a suit challenging the constitutionality of the legislation. The suit alleged that the college enjoyed the right to contract and the government changing that contract was not allowed. Chief Justice John Marshall delivered the majority opinion and affirmed that the right to contract exists between owners of private property rather than between a government and its citizens. The case was the first in US history to raise fundamental questions about corporate entities and the protections they enjoy. It also set a precedent by extending "individual rights" to corporations.

==== Santa Clara County v. Southern Pacific Railroad, 1886 ====
The railroad was an expensive multi-year project that greatly changed and altered both the physical and commercial landscape of the country. As with most new technological developments that have a broad impact, there are disputes about how those technologies and the businesses they support fit under the umbrella of laws that govern regulations and taxation. In 1886 one such taxation dispute arose between Santa Clara County and Southern Pacific Railroad. The railroad thought the tax code was misapplied to some of their property and assets. In deciding the case, a unanimous court ruled that governments must abide by the same tax code enforcement for individuals that it did for corporations. While not explicitly stated in the case, it was implied that this case extended equal protection rights to corporations under the 14th amendment.

==== Liggett v. Lee, 1933 ====
The booming economy the railroad corporations helped build from the late 19th into the early 20th centuries came to a screeching halt in 1929. The Great Depression, as it came to be known, helped a view of corporations emerge that put them at odds with the average worker. The election of Franklin D. Roosevelt reflected many populist sentiments. In 1933 a Florida case came before the court, again disputing taxation. In Liggett v. Lee the court ruled that there could be a corporate tax, essentially saying the structure of business was a justifiably discriminatory criterion for governments to consider when writing tax legislation.

==== First National Bank of Boston v. Bellotti, 1978 ====
From 1940 to 1990 the percent of total GDP made up by financial service professionals increased by 300%. Along with that growth there was a growth in the profits this industry experienced as well. As the disposable income of banks and other financial institutions rose, they sought a way to use it to influence politics and policy. In response, Massachusetts passed a law limiting corporate donations strictly to issues related to their industry. The First National Bank of Boston challenged the law on First Amendment grounds and won. First National Bank of Boston v. Bellotti allowed business to use financial speech in political causes of any nature.

==== Citizens United v. FEC, 2010 ====
In 2010 amidst an outpouring of frustration and blame directed at Wall Street the issue of corporate contributions came before the court again. In Citizens United v. FEC the court said there was virtually no distinction between monetary contributions and political speech, and because the First Amendment of the United States does not limit political speech unless it is tantamount to bribery, corporations have the right as people to donate unlimited amounts of money to any political cause so long as it is not to a direct campaign.

=== Steps required for incorporation ===
The articles of incorporation (also called a charter, certificate of incorporation or letters patent) are filed with the appropriate state office, listing the purpose of the corporation, its principal place of business and the number and type of shares of stock. A registration fee is due, which varies between $25 and $1,000, depending on the state.

A corporate name is generally made up of three parts: "distinctive element", "descriptive element", and a legal ending. All corporations must have a distinctive element, and in most filing jurisdictions, a legal ending to their names. Some corporations choose not to have a descriptive element. In the name "Tiger Computers, Inc.", the word "Tiger" is the distinctive element; the word "Computers" is the descriptive element; and the "Inc." is the legal ending. The legal ending indicates that it is in fact a legal corporation and not just a business registration or partnership. Incorporated, limited, and corporation, or their respective abbreviations (Inc., Ltd., Corp.) are the possible legal endings in the US.

Usually, there are also corporate bylaws which must be filed with the state. Bylaws outline a number of important administrative details such as when annual shareholder meetings will be held, who can vote and the manner in which shareholders will be notified if there is need for an additional "special" meeting.

=== Taxation ===
Corporations can only deduct net operating losses going back two years and forward 20 years.

=== Reporting after incorporation ===
Assuming a corporation has not sold stock to the public, conducting corporate business is straightforward. Often, it amounts to recording key corporate decisions (for example, borrowing money or buying real estate) and holding an annual meeting. These formalities can often be supplanted by written agreement and do not usually need a face-to-face meeting.

== Europe ==
=== United Kingdom ===
The process of incorporation is called company formation in the UK, it is considered one of the fasted locations to incorporate, with a fully electronic process, and a fast turnaround time by the national registrar of companies, the Companies House. A certificate of incorporation is issued by the authority following an electronic application.

There are many different types of UK company:

- Public limited company (PLC)
- Private company limited by shares (Ltd.)
- Company limited by guarantee
- Unlimited company (Unltd.)
- Limited liability partnership (LLP)
- Community interest company
- Industrial and provident society (IPS)
- Royal charter (RC)
- Except for an unlimited company or corporation, which requires no designation as part of its legal company name, the titles Ltd. (limited company), CIC, CIO, or plc (public limited company) are used for corporations (or their Welsh equivalents in Wales).

=== Elsewhere in Europe ===
- In Germany, Austria and Switzerland, the GmbH ("Gesellschaft mit beschränkter Haftung", meaning "limited liability business association"), as well as the AG ("Aktiengesellschaft", meaning "business association with shares"), are the entities most similar to the corporations in the US.
- In France, Switzerland, Belgium and Luxembourg, the term "SARL (French: société à responsibilité limitée, company with limited liability)" or SA (French: société anonyme, anonymous corporation) or SAS (French: société par actions simplifiée, simplified anonymous joint-stock corporation) is used.
- Spain, Portugal, Romania and Latin America use the title SA (anonymous partnership) for stock corporations or Ltda (limitada or limited liability) for limited companies. (Ltda is denoted SL in Spain, for "Sociedad Limitada", and SRL in Argentina, for "Sociedad de Responsabilidad Limitada").
- In Poland all types of companies are regulated by the Code of Commercial Companies. Companies in Poland are divided into two categories: corporations and partnerships; corporations provide liability limitation, while partnerships do not provide liability limitation or provide limitations just for selected partners. Two most popular forms of corporations are: SA (standing for Spółka Akcyjna - equivalent of joint stock company) and Sp. z o.o. (Spółka z ograniczoną odpowiedzialnością - equivalent of limited liability company). Amongst partnerships there are available: Spółka jawna (sp.j.) – a partnership where all the partners are fully liable); Spółka komandytowa (Sp. K.) – a partnership where at least one partner is fully liable and other one has limited liability; and Spółka komandytowo-akcyjna (Sp. K. A.) – a partnership where at least one partner is fully liable and other one is a stock shareholder not being liable.
- Denmark and Norway use the title A/S for stock corporations (Danish: Aktieselskab, Norwegian: Aksjeselskap), while Sweden uses the similar AB (Swedish: aktiebolag). Finland uses Oy (Finnish: Osakeyhtiö) for shareholder-owned company, Oyj for stock exchange corporations (Osakeyhtiö, julkinen) and Ay (Avoin yhtiö) or Ky (Kommandiittiyhtiö) for private enterprises.
- Italy uses "Srl" or "Società a Responsabilità Limitata" (limited liability company), and "SpA" or "Società Per Azioni" (stock corporation).
- Slovakia and the Czech Republic use s.r.o. (Slovak: spoločnosť s ručením obmedzeným, Czech: společnost s ručením omezeným meaning "business with limited liability") and a.s. (Slovak: akciová spoločnosť, Czech: akciová společnost meaning "business with shares").
- In Latvia, the most commonly used title of a corporation is "SIA" (Latvian: Sabiedrība ar ierobežotu atbildību) for "limited liability company", or "LLC", and "AS" (Latvian: Akciju sabiedrība) for "joint stock company", or "JSC". The title "SIA" and "AS" are put before the name of the corporation. Lithuania uses "UAB" (Lithuanian: Uždaroji Akcinė Bendrovė) for "limited liability company" and "AB" (Lithuanian: Akcinė Bendrovė) for "joint stock company", and, like in Latvia, they also appear before the corporation's name.
- Bulgaria, Serbia, Croatia, Bosnia and Herzegovina, Montenegro, North Macedonia, and Slovenia uses: "D.O.O." or "Д.О.О." (in Cyrillic) (Serbian and Croatian: Društvo sa Ograničenom Odgovornošću / Друштво са Ограниченом Одговорношћу, Macedonian: Друштво со ограничена одговорност). The only difference is in Bulgaria, where it is reversed: "ООД" (OOD) (Bulgarian: Дружество с ограничена отговорност, romanization: Druzhestvo s ogranichena otgovornost). It also can be used for Ltd. (UK)
- Albania uses "Sh.p.k" (Albanian: Shoqëri me Përgjegjësi të Kufizuar) for "limited liability company", "Sh.a." (Albanian: Shoqëri Anonime), meaning "anonymous partnership", for stock corporations. Pursuant to the Albanian legislation, the possible business structures are:

Sole proprietorship (person fizik) – A business owned and managed by one individual who is personally liable for all business debts and obligations.
Limited liability company (LLC) – A hybrid legal structure that provides the limited liability features of a corporation and the tax efficiencies and operational flexibility of a partnership.
Corporation – A legal entity owned by shareholders.
Non-profit – An organization engaged in activities of public or private interest where making a profit is not a primary mission. Some non-profits are exempt from federal taxes.

- In the Netherlands, N.V. (Naamloze Vennootschap) and B.V. (Besloten Vennootschap met beperkte aansprakelijkheid) are used. In Belgium, the abbreviations NV and Bvba (or BV, resulting the new Belgian Code of Companies and Associations) are used for similar types of entity.
- The European Commission called on EU member states in 2008 to reduce the level of fees required by their national business administration organisations "taking inspiration from EU best performers".

== Asia ==
- In India, the term Pvt Ltd is used for a company that is private, an entity similar to an LLC in the United States. Ltd is used for publicly listed companies (shares of a listed company are traded on the stock market) or a public corporation, a similar entity to a corporation in the US.
- Indonesia uses PT (Indonesian: Perseroan Terbatas), meaning "private limited", which is the equivalent of an incorporated entity in the US. This legal title is stated in front of the corporation name. If the shares become publicly listed for trading in stock exchange, it is called Tbk. (Indonesian: Terbuka), appended after the corporation name.
- China uses WFOE (or WOFE), to refer to a Wholly Foreign Owned Enterprise (WFOE). This is the most popular form of business entity for foreign investors wanting to set up a company in China; it is a limited liability company.
- Malaysia uses Sdn. Bhd. (Malay: Sendirian Berhad), meaning "private limited", which is the equivalent of an incorporated entity in the US.
- Singapore uses Pte. Ltd., meaning "private limited", which is the equivalent of an incorporated entity in the US.
- Dubai uses "LLC" to denote a limited liability company. Listed companies use "PJSC" to denote a public joint stock company.
- In Turkey, there are two types of companies: Joint Stock Company (JSC) and Limited Liability Company (LLC). 100% foreign ownership of a JSC is legally permitted under the Turkish Law. A foreigner who has never been to Turkey can become a shareholder of a Turkish JSC by way of a power of attorney. Ltd. Şti. (which stands for Limited Şirketi) is a common form to denote limited liability companies.
- In the Philippines, business formation uses the terms Corporation and Incorporated (Inc.) in a similar way to their use in the US.

== Canada ==
In Canada, the process of incorporation can be done either at the federal or provincial level. Companies which incorporate with the federal government will generally need to register extra-provincially in the province that they elect to do business. Similarly, a provincial corporation may need to register extra-provincially if they are to have offices outside of their home province. Incorporated Canadian companies can generally use either Corp., Corporation, Inc., Incorporated, Incorporée, Limited, Limitée, Ltd., Ltée, Société par actions de régime fédéral, and S.A.R.F in their name, but this may vary from province to province. Note that there are two government structures operating within Canada. The French system is prevalent in Quebec, while the English system is operating in the 12 other provinces and territories.

== See also ==
- Articles of incorporation
- BVBA
- Delaware corporation
- General incorporation law
- Limited liability company
- List of company registers
- Types of business entity
