= History of corporate law in the United States =

The history of corporate law in the United States concerns the development of the corporation, primarily as a business organization, under the different United States corporate law, including federal regulation.

== Common law ==
The United Kingdom required a legislative charter for incorporation until passage of the Joint Stock Companies Act 1844.

- Case of Sutton's Hospital (1612) 77 Eng Rep 960
- Keech v Sandford [1726] EWHC Ch J76
- Attorney General v. Davy (1741) 2 Atk 212
- The Charitable Corporation v Sutton (1742) 26 ER 642
- Whelpdale v Cookson (1747) 27 ER 856
- R v Richardson (1758) 97 ER 426

== Colonial corporations ==
- Virginia Company (London Company and Plymouth Company est 1606–1624) and Plymouth Council for New England
- Massachusetts Bay Company est. 1628
- Hudson's Bay Company est. 1670
- Bank of England est. 1694
- South Sea Company and South Sea Bubble
- Russian-American Company

== Post-independence ==
Prior to the late 19th century, most companies were incorporated by a special bill adopted by legislature. By the end of the 18th century, there were about 300 incorporated companies in the United States, most of them providing public services, and only eight manufacturing companies. The formation of a corporation usually required an act of legislature. State enactment of corporation laws, which was becoming more common by the 1830s, allowed companies to incorporate without securing the adoption of a special legislative bill. However, given the restrictive nature of state corporation laws, many companies preferred to seek a special legislative act for incorporation to attain privileges or monopolies, even until the late nineteenth century. In 1819, the U.S. Supreme Court granted corporations rights they had not previously recognized in Trustees of Dartmouth College v. Woodward. The Supreme Court declared that a corporation is not transformed into civil institution just because the government commissioned its corporate charter; and, accordingly, it deemed corporate charters "inviolable" and not subject to arbitrary amendment or abolition by state governments.

New York was the first state to enact a corporate statute in 1811. The Act Relative to Incorporations for Manufacturing Purposes of 1811, allowed for free incorporation with limited liability, but only for manufacturing businesses. New Jersey followed New York's lead in 1816, when it enacted its first corporate law. In 1837, Connecticut adopted a general corporation statute that allowed for the incorporation of any corporation engaged in any lawful business. Delaware did not enact its first corporation law until 1883.

- Bank of the United States v. Deveaux, 9 U.S. 61 (1809) corporations have capacity to sue.
- Gibbons v. Ogden, 22 US 1 (1824) the right of Congress to regulate interstate trade under the commerce clause.

== General incorporation laws ==
A general incorporation law allows corporations to be formed without a charter from the legislature. It also refers to a law enabling a certain type of corporation, such as a railroad, to exercise eminent domain and other special rights without a charter from the legislature.

Early state corporation laws were all restrictive in design, often with the intention of preventing corporations for gaining too much wealth and power. Investors generally had to be given an equal say in corporate governance, and corporations were required to comply with the purposes expressed in their charters. Therefore, some large-scale businesses used other forms of association; for example, Andrew Carnegie formed his steel operation as a limited partnership and John D. Rockefeller set up Standard Oil as a corporate trust.

In the late 19th century, state governments started to adopt more permissive corporate laws. In 1896, New Jersey was the first state to adopt an "enabling" corporate law, with the goal of attracting more business to the state. As a result of its early enabling corporate statute, New Jersey was the first leading corporate state. In 1899, Delaware followed New Jersey's lead with the enactment of an enabling corporate statute, but Delaware only became the leading corporate state after the enabling provisions of the 1896 New Jersey corporate law were repealed in 1913. Despite the fact that New Jersey changed its corporate law again in 1917 to reenact an enabling corporate statute similar to the repealed 1899 enabling statute, corporations had relocated to Delaware for good; Delaware has been the leading corporate state since the 1920s.

=== List of early general incorporation laws ===
- North Carolina, 1795
- Massachusetts, 1799
- Connecticut in 1837.
- Ohio: May 1, 1852
- New Jersey: April 2, 1873 (breaking the Camden and Amboy Rail Road's monopoly and allowing for the National Railway project)
- Santa Clara County v. Southern Pacific Railroad Company, 118 U.S. 394 (1886)
- M Dodd, 'American Business Association Law a Hundred Years Ago and Today', in 3 Law: A Century of Progress: 1835-1935 (Reppy 1937) 254, 289

== Antitrust and mergers ==
In 1890, Congress passed the Sherman Antitrust Act, which criminalised cartels that acted in restraint of trade. While the case law developed, which eventually began cracking down on the normal practices of businesses who cooperated or colluded with one another, corporations could not acquire stock in one another's businesses. However, in 1898, New Jersey, at the time the leading corporate state, changed its law to allow this. Delaware mirrored New Jersey's enactment in an 1899 statute that stated that shares held in other corporations did not confer voting rights and acquisition of shares in other companies required explicit authorisation. Any corporation created under the Delaware General Corporation Law (DGCL) could purchase, hold, sell, or assign shares of other corporations. Accordingly, Delaware corporations could acquire stock in other corporations registered in Delaware and exercise all rights. This helped make Delaware increasingly an attractive places for businesses to incorporate holding companies, through which they could retain control over large operations without sanction under the Sherman Act. As antitrust law continued to tighten, companies integrated through mergers fully.

- Clayton Act of 1914
- William Peters Hepburn proposed a Hepburn Bill of 1908 which would have required federal incorporation. This was attacked from various groups who wished to maintain the state system of incorporation. MI Urofsky, ‘Proposed Federal Incorporation in the Progressive Era’ (1982) 26 American Journal of Legislative History 160.

== Great Depression and New Deal ==
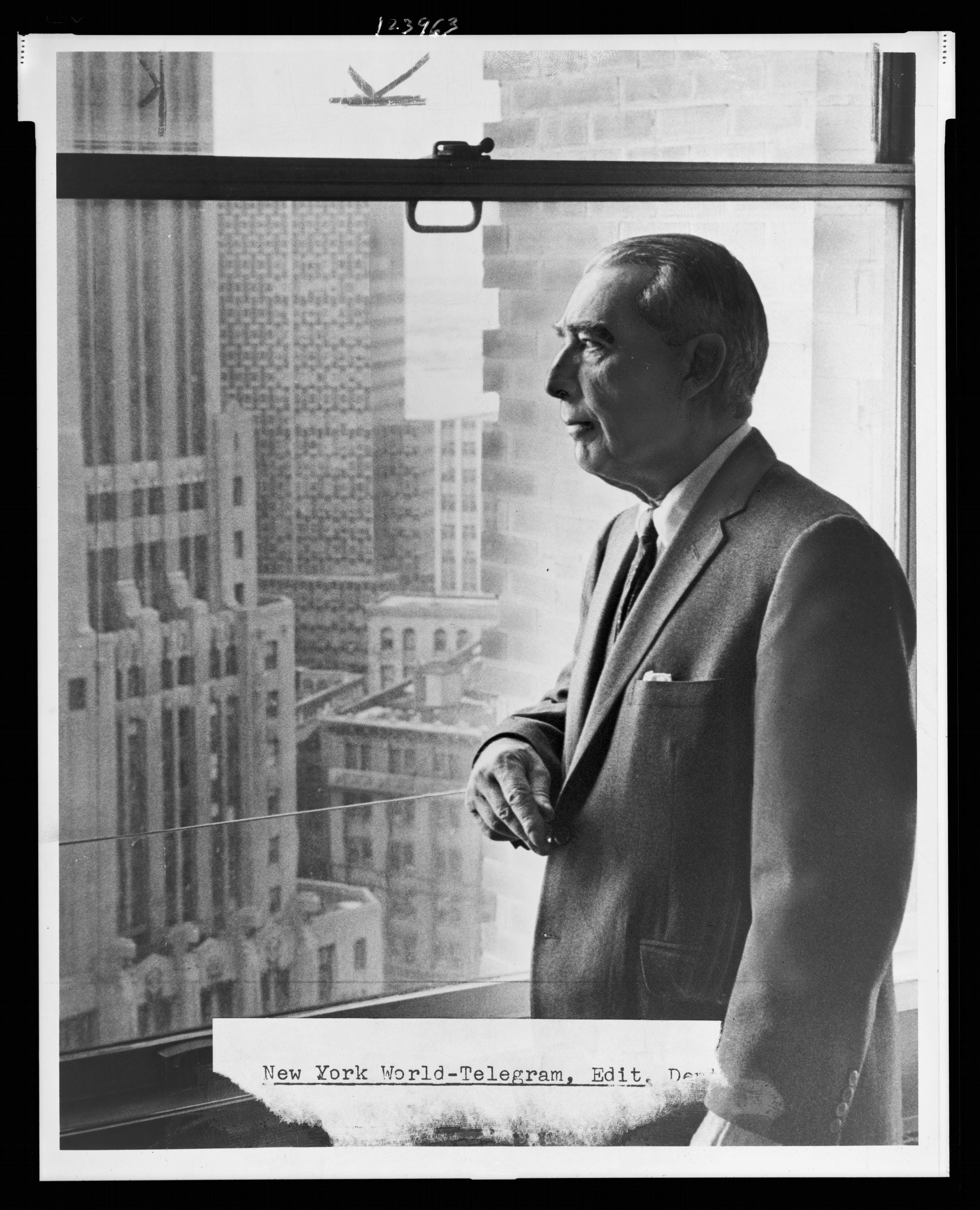
AA Berle, with coauthor Gardiner Means, wrote The Modern Corporation and Private Property in 1932, as a response to the Wall Street crash. They gathered evidence that in modern corporations directors had become too unaccountable, requiring New Deal law reforms.

Limited liability was a matter of state law, and in Delaware up until 1967, it was left to the certificate of incorporation to stipulate “whether the private property of the stockholders... shall be subject to the payment of corporate debts, and if so, to what extent.” In California, limited liability was recognised as late as 1931.

- AA Berle and GC Means, The Modern Corporation and Private Property (1932)
- Securities Act of 1933 and Securities and Exchange Act of 1934

== See also ==
- United States corporate law
- History of company law in the United Kingdom
- Sherman Antitrust Act
- S Corporation
- C Corporation
- Limited Liability Corporation
- Sole Proprietorship
- Partnership
- Outline of organizational theory
