= Administered prices =

Administered prices are prices of goods set by the internal pricing structures of firms that take into account cost rather than through the market forces of supply and demand and predicted by classical economics. They were first described by institutional economists Gardiner Means and Adolf A. Berle in their 1932 book The Modern Corporation and Private Property. As Means argued in 1972, "Basically, the administered-price thesis holds that a large body of industrial prices do not behave in the fashion that classical theory would lead one to expect. It was first developed in 1934–35 to apply to the cyclical behavior of industrial prices. It specifically held that in business recessions administered prices showed a tendency not to fall as much as market prices while the recession fall in demand worked itself out primarily through a fall in sales, production, and employment."

== Empirical data ==
Since Means and Berle's pioneering work in the 1930s, numerous empirical surveys have been carried out to understand the role of administered prices in national economies. Surveys conducted in the 1980s found that 70–85% of American industrial prices were markup or cost-added prices. An American survey from the 1990s covering an industrial and non-industrial pricing behavior found that a majority of prices take cost into account. A Canadian survey from 2002 found that 67.1% of major Canadian firms attributed price-stickiness to markup pricing. A 2003–2004 survey done in France found that 36.9% of prices are cost-added (another 4% of prices were "regulated"). Writing in 2006, Fabiani et al found that administered prices account for 42% of prices (of both goods and services) in Italy, 46% in Belgium, 52% in Spain, 65% in Portugal, and an average of 54% of all Eurozone prices. They also account for 40% of the prices of goods sold in France and 73% of those sold in Germany. A survey of 725 Norwegian firms from the 2000s found that 69% of those firms use markup pricing. A survey of 5,300 New Zealand firms found that 54% of business prices were cost-added, while another survey of 700 Australian companies found that at least 49% of their prices were marked-up. A study of 630 Japanese firms from 2000 found 54% of them use mark-up pricing. A survey of 580 Icelandic firms found that markup prices were the most common, accounting for 45% of all prices set by those companies.

== See also ==
- Markup
- Price controls

== Sources ==
- Berle, Adolf A. and Gardner C. Means. 1932. "The Modern Corporation and Private Property." Macmillan, New York.
- Means, G. C. 1992 [1933]. "The Corporate Revolution," in Frederic S. Lee and Warren J. Samuels (eds.), The Heterodox Economics of Gardiner C. Means: A Collection. M.E. Sharpe, Armonk, N.Y.
- Means, G. C. 1935. "Industrial Prices and their Relative Inflexibility." US Senate Document no. 13, 74th Congress, 1st Session, Government Printing Office, Washington DC.
- Means, G. C. 1936. "Notes on Inflexible Prices," American Economic Review 26 (Supplement): 23–35.
- Means, G. C. 1939–1940. "Big Business, Administered Prices, and the Problem of Full Employment," Journal of Marketing 4: 370–381.
- Means, G. C. 1962. "Pricing Power and the Public Interest." Harper and Brothers. New York.
- Means, G. C. 1972. "The Administered Price Thesis Reconfirmed." American Economic Review 62: 292–306.
- Laguerodie and Vergara "The Theory of Price Controls" par (Review of Political Economy, October 2008)
