= Cost-plus pricing =

Strategy of setting prices based on a fixed markup percentage

Cost-plus pricing is a pricing strategy by which the selling price of a product is determined by adding a specific fixed percentage (a "markup") to the product's unit cost. Essentially, the markup percentage is a method of generating a particular desired rate of return. An alternative pricing method is value-based pricing.

Cost-plus pricing has often been used for government contracts (cost-plus contracts), and has been criticized for reducing incentive for suppliers to control direct costs, indirect costs and fixed costs whether related to the production and sale of the product or service or not.

Companies using this strategy need to record their costs in detail to ensure they have a comprehensive understanding of their overall costs. This information is necessary to generate accurate cost estimates.

Cost-plus pricing is especially common for utilities and single-buyer products that are manufactured to the buyer's specification, such as for military procurement.

== Mechanics ==
The three stages of computing the selling price are computing the total cost, computing the unit cost, and then adding a markup to generate a selling price (refer to Fig 1).

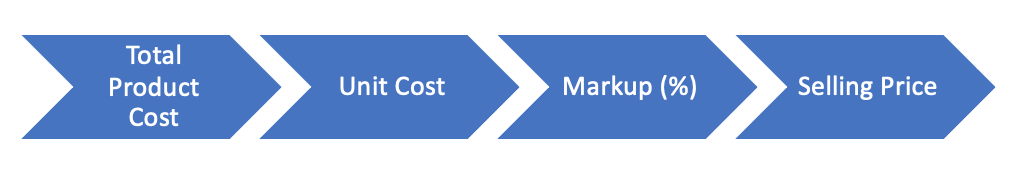
Fig 1: Cost-plus pricing steps

Step 1: Calculating total cost

Total cost = fixed costs + variable costs

Fixed costs do not generally depend on the number of units, while variable costs do.

Step 2: Calculating unit cost

Unit cost = (total cost/number of units)

Step 3a: Calculating markup price

Markup price = (unit cost * markup percentage)

The markup is a percentage that is expected to provide an acceptable rate of return to the manufacturer.

Step 3b: Calculating Selling Price (SP)

Selling Price = unit cost + markup price

== Example ==
A shop selling a vacuum cleaner will be examined since retail stores generally adopt this strategy.

Total cost = $450

Markup percentage = 12%

Markup price = (unit cost * markup percentage)

Markup price = $450 * 0.12

Markup price = $54

Sales Price = unit cost + markup price

Sales Price= $450 + $54

Sales Price = $504

Ultimately, the $54 markup price is the shop's margin of profit.

Cost-plus pricing is common and there are many examples where the margin is transparent to buyers. Costco reportedly created rules to limit product markups to 15% with an average markup of 11% across all products sold.

== Rationale ==
Buyers may perceive that cost-plus pricing is reasonable. In some cases, the markup is mutually agreed upon by buyer and seller. For markets that feature relatively similar production costs, companies do not have a dominant strategy. Therefore, cost-plus pricing can offer competitive stability, decreasing the risk of price competition (such as price wars), if all companies adopt cost-plus pricing. The strategy enables price changes to goods and services relative to increases or decreases in the product cost which are simple to communicate and justify to customers. When there is little market intelligence, the use of a cost-plus pricing strategy compensates for the lack of information by setting prices based on actual costs. This method is generally adopted by retail companies such as grocery or clothing stores.

Cost-based pricing is a way to induce a seller to accept a contract the costs of which represent a large fraction of the seller's revenues, or for which costs are uncertain at contract signing, as for example for research and development.

== Economic theory ==
Cost-plus pricing is not common in markets that are (nearly) perfectly competitive, for which prices and output are such that marginal cost (the cost of producing an additional unit) equals marginal revenue. In the long run, marginal and average costs (as for cost-plus) tend to converge, reducing the difference between the two strategies. It works well when a business is in need of short-term finance.

== Elasticity considerations ==
Although this method of pricing has limited application as mentioned above, it is used commonly for the purpose of ensuring a business covers its costs by "breaking even" and not operating at a loss whilst generating at least a minimum rate of profit. In spite of its ubiquity, economists rightly point out that it has serious flaws. Specifically, the strategy requires little market research hence it does not account for external factors such as consumer demand and competitor's prices when determining an appropriate selling price. There is no way in advance of determining if potential customers will purchase the product at the calculated price. Regardless of which pricing strategy a company chooses, price elasticity (sensitivity of demand to price) is a vital component to examine. To compensate for this, some economists have tried to apply the principles of price elasticity to cost-plus pricing.

We know that:

MR = P + ((dP / dQ) * Q)

where:

MR = marginal revenue
P = price
(dP / dQ) = the derivative of price with respect to quantity

Q = quantity

Since we know that a profit maximizer sets quantity at the point that marginal revenue is equal to marginal cost (MR = MC), the formula can be written as:

MC = P + ((dP / dQ) * Q)

Dividing by P and rearranging yields:

MC / P = 1 +((dP / dQ) * (Q / P))

And since (P / MC) is a form of markup, we can calculate the appropriate markup for any given market elasticity by:

(P / MC) = (1 / (1 – (1/E)))

where:

(P / MC) = markup on marginal costs
E = price elasticity of demand

In the extreme case where elasticity is infinite:

(P / MC) = (1 / (1 – (1/999999999999999)))
(P / MC) = (1 / 1)

Price is equal to marginal cost. There is no markup. At the other extreme, where elasticity is equal to unity:

(P /MC) = (1 / (1 – (1/1)))
(P / MC) = (1 / 0)

The markup is infinite. Most business people do not do marginal cost calculations, but one can arrive at the same conclusion using average variable costs (AVC):

(P / AVC) = (1 / (1 – (1/E)))

Technically, AVC is a valid substitute for MC only in situations of constant returns to scale (LVC = LAC = LMC).

When business people choose the markup that they apply to costs when doing cost-plus pricing, they should be, and often are, considering the price elasticity of demand, whether consciously or not.

== See also ==
- Marketing
- Markup (business)
- Microeconomics
- Outline of industrial organization
- Price elasticity of demand
- Pricing
