= Downward harmonization =

Economic and political term

Downward harmonization is an econo-political term describing the act of adapting the trade laws of a country with an established economy "downward" to the trade laws of the country with a developing economy. This "harmonizing" may affect labor laws, human rights laws, minimum-wage, industry standards, quality control, anti-terrorism, etc.

== General information ==
Downward harmonization refers to the process of reducing regulatory requirements or standards in order to bring them into alignment with the lowest common denominator. This may be done in order to facilitate trade or cooperation between countries or regions with different regulatory regimes, or to reduce the costs or burdens associated with complying with regulations.

Downward harmonization can take many forms, and may involve the reduction of standards for consumer protection, environmental protection, labor standards, or other areas. It may be driven by a desire to lower costs for businesses or to reduce barriers to trade.

Overall, the process of downward harmonization is an important aspect of global trade and economic cooperation, and its impact on regulatory standards and the costs and benefits of trade and cooperation are areas of ongoing debate and discussion.

== See also ==
- Race to the bottom
