= Act Relative to Incorporations for Manufacturing Purposes of 1811 =

The Act relative to incorporations for manufacturing purposes passed by the 34th New York State Legislature on March 22, 1811, was the first law in the US giving a general authorization for formation of corporations. Whereas previously all corporations had to be formed by legislative charter, the 1811 act created a procedure for incorporation of manufacturing firms capitalized at $100,000 or less.

== Background ==
Following the Embargo Act of 1807 and Non-Intercourse Act (1809), the United States found itself on a war footing and facing a shortage of textiles and other manufactured goods. New York Governor Daniel D. Tompkins announced the need for economic independence, and the state legislature approved a rising number of manufacturing charters. The need for domestic thread production sufficed as political justification for the groundbreaking law.

General incorporation laws had already been issued for religious organizations (1784), colleges (1787), municipalities (1788), libraries (1792), medical groups (1806), and turnpikes (1807), providing models for the legislation, and ensuring public familiarity with the concept.

== Content ==
The law authorized groups of five or more to form a manufacturing corporation with lifespan of twenty years. It applied to various types of fabric production and metalworking. The corporation so formed was to be governed by no more than nine trustees, and have capital stock of no more than $100,000.

The law extended incomplete limited liability for the shareholders of the corporations, stipulating in Section 7 that "for all debts which shall be due and owing by the company at the time of its dissolution, the persons then composing such company shall be individually responsible to the extent of their respective shares of stock in the said company, and no further...".

Upon depositing a certificate with the New York Secretary of State,

the persons who shall have signed and acknowledged the said certificate, and their successors, shall, for the term of twenty years next after the day of filing such certificate, be a body politics and corporate, in fact and in name, by the name stated in such certificate, and by that name they and their successors shall and may have succession, and shall be persons in law capable of suing and being sued, pleasing and being impleaded, answering and being answered unto, defending and being defended, in all courts and places whatsoever, in all manner of actions, suits, complaints, matters and causes whatsoever; and they and their successors may have a common seal, and the same may make, alter, and change at their pleasure; and that they and their successors, by their corporate name, shall in law be capable of buying, purchasing, holding and conveying, any lands, tenements, hereditaments, goods, wares, and merchandise, whatsoever, necessary to enable the said company to carry on their manufacturing operations mentioned in such certificate.

== Development ==
The Act expired after five years and lapsed for a week before a one-year renewal in 1816; it lapsed again and was renewed for five years in 1818. In 1821 it was made permanent and remained law until 1890. Its scope was progressively broadened to include clay, then pinmakers and beer brewers, then leather makers, then salt makers.

The law was followed in other states by similar laws. In October 1814, New York passed "An act to encourage privateering associations", a general incorporation law for privateers.

== Results ==
By 1818, one hundred and twenty-nine manufacturing firms had incorporated in New York. By 1848, 362 firms had incorporated under the Act (compared to 150 manufacturing firms and 1220 companies total incorporated by legislative charter). Of the 362 corporations created under the new law, 226 dealt with textiles, 62 with metal, and 15 with glassware.
