= Peter A. A. Berle =

American politician

Member of the Joint Public Advisory Committee
- In office 1993–2002

President of the National Audubon Society
- In office 1985–1995
- Preceded by: Russell W. Peterson
- Succeeded by: John Flicker

Commissioner of the New York State Department of Environmental Conservation
- In office 1976–1979
- Governor: Hugh Carey
- Preceded by: Ogden R. Reid
- Succeeded by: Robert F. Flacke

Member of the New York State Assembly from the 64th District
- In office January 1, 1969 – December 31, 1972

Personal details
- Born: Peter Adolf Augustus Berle III; December 8, 1937 New York City, New York
- Died: November 1, 2007 (aged 69) Pittsfield, Massachusetts
- Party: Democrat / Liberal
- Spouse: Lila Sloane Wilde (m. 1960–2007)
- Relations: Cortlandt Field Bishop (grandfather)
- Children: 4
- Parent(s): Adolf A. Berle; Beatrice Bishop
- Education: Harvard University; Harvard Law School
- Profession: Lawyer, politician, environmentalist

Military service
- Allegiance: United States of America
- Branch/service: United States Air Force
- Rank: First lieutenant
- Battles/wars: Vietnam War

Peter Adolf Augustus Berle (December 8, 1937 – November 1, 2007) was a lawyer, conservationist and member of the New York Assembly.

== Early life ==
Berle was born on December 8, 1937, in New York City to Adolf Augustus Berle Jr. (1895–1971) and Dr. Beatrice (née Bishop) Berle (1902–1993). His father was an important member of U.S. President Franklin Roosevelt's "Brain Trust" and served as Assistant Secretary of State and U.S. Ambassador to Brazil. His mother was a prominent physician and author. He had two sisters, Beatrice Van Cortlandt Berle and Alice Bishop Berle.

His maternal grandparents were Cortlandt Field Bishop and the former Amy Bend. His great-grandfather was George Hoffman Bend, a member of the New York Stock Exchange who was prominent in New York Society. His paternal grandparents were Mary Augusta (née Wright) and Adolf Augustus Berle.

Berle graduated from Harvard University and Harvard Law School. After his father's death in 1971, his mother married Dr. André Frédéric Cournand, a physician who was awarded the Nobel Prize for medicine in 1956.

== Career ==
After graduating from Harvard, Berle joined the United States Air Force where he trained as a parachutist and intelligence officer. After being honorably discharged with the rank of first lieutenant, he returned to Cambridge for law school. After graduating from law school, he joined the prestigious law firm of Paul, Weiss, Rifkind and Garrison, where he was assigned to a case litigating against Consolidated Edison. Con Ed planned on building a pump storage facility on a hillside overlooking the Hudson River but Berle and the firm won a precedent-setting victory that forced the company to fix any environmental damage.

Soon after in 1971, he founded Berle, Butzel & Kass, one of the first environmental law firms in the country. His firm successfully litigated against Union Carbide for fouling underground water on Long Island.

=== New York State Assembly ===
In 1968, Berle was elected to the New York State Assembly serving three consecutive terms in the 178th, 179th and 180th New York State Legislatures from January 1, 1969, to December 31, 1974, on the Democrat / Liberal tickets. His district, known as a Silk-Stocking District, extended from 60th Street to 125th Street.

As a freshman legislator, he successfully sued then-Gov. Nelson Rockefeller over budgetary process issues. He played an important role in expanding Adirondack State Park by more than 9,000 acres in the park, including 11 of the highest peaks in the Adirondacks. He eventually became the ranking member of the Committee on Environmental Conservation. During his time in office, he wrote the book "Does the Citizen Stand a Chance?" advocating for the rights of underprivileged constituents, published in 1974.

=== N.Y.S. Department of Environmental Conservation ===
In May 1976, Berle was appointed by Gov. Hugh Carey to succeed Ogden R. Reid as Commissioner of the New York State Department of Environmental Conservation. In this role, he helped initiate the cleanup of the Love Canal toxic waste dump at Niagara Falls. During his tenure, action was taken against the General Electric Company for discharge of PCBs into the Hudson River and his office was responsible for readying and running the venues at the 1980 Winter Olympics in Lake Placid.

Berle, who was known as "fiercely independent," was forced to resign on December 12, 1978, after several disagreements with Gov. Carey. He was succeeded by Robert F. Flacke, who was previously the chairman of the Adirondack Park Agency.

=== National Audubon Society ===
From 1985 to 1995, he served as president of the National Audubon Society, succeeding Russell W. Peterson, the former Governor of Delaware. Concurrently, he was the president of the Stockbridge Land Trust, director of the Orion Society and a trustee and former chairman of the Century Foundation.

As president, he worked to prevent oil drilling in the Arctic National Wildlife Refuge as well as arguing before the Supreme Court in support of responsible handling of water issues in the Midwest.

=== Joint Public Advisory Committee ===
In 1993, he was one of the five U.S. members appointed by President William J. Clinton to the Joint Public Advisory Committee, a constituent piece of the Commission on Environmental Cooperation under the North American Free Trade Agreement, serving until 2002.

== Personal life ==
In 1960, Berle married Lila Sloane Wilde in Lenox, Massachusetts. She was the daughter of Helm George Wilde (1907–1998) and Marjorie Lila Field (1910–1997), herself a granddaughter of Emily Vanderbilt Sloane (1874–1970). Lila's maternal uncle was Frederick Vanderbilt Field (1905–2000). Peter and Lila were the parents of:

- Dolf A. Berle, the former president of Lucky Strike Entertainment and Dave & Busters.
- Mary A. Berle, former principal of Muddy Brook Elementary School in Great Barrington, MA.
- Beatrice L. Berle, who runs Berle Farm an organic farm in Hoosick, New York
- Robert T. Berle, a real estate investor.

Berle died on November 1, 2007, in Pittsfield, Massachusetts of injuries sustained in August 2007 in Stockbridge when the roof of a barn collapsed as he was dismantling it. His funeral was held at St. Paul's Episcopal Church in Stockbridge.

=== Residences ===
In 1998, Berle's wife inherited Elm Court, the historic Vanderbilt estate in Lenox, Massachusetts.

New York State Assembly
Preceded by John M. Burns	New York State Assembly; 64th District; 1969–1972	Succeeded by William F. Passannante
