= Collective capitalism =

Economic theory by G. Means

Collective capitalism was a theory that was advanced by American economist Gardiner Means in the 1960s. It was intended to overcome the failings of traditional capitalism, using the Great Depression in the 1930s as an example. It rejects the principles advanced by Adam Smith, who created the notion of the "invisible hand" of 'self-correcting' market forces. The theory expresses the capitalist socialization of production, but only in a distorted manner. Japan's collective capitalism relies on cooperation, but ignores the fact that the means of production are private. It cannot be considered socialist because the means of production belongs to corporations.

== Collective capitalist theory ==
The essence of the theory of collective capitalism is expressed by Means in the following proposition: "We now have single corporate enterprises employing hundreds of thousands of workers, having hundreds of thousands of stockholders, using billions of dollars’ worth of the instruments of production, serving millions of customers, and controlled by a single management group. These are great collectives of enterprises, and a system composed of them or dominated by them might well be called 'collective capitalism'".

Collective capitalism places an emphasis on cooperative long-term relationships, resulting in an economy directed by "relational markets". An example of this is interlocking share ownership, in which companies own shares in other companies; this results in a spirit of cooperation between the involved companies, since each has an interest in the other's performance. An important example of this is the Japanese economy, in which 40% of the shares traded on the Tokyo Stock Exchange are owned by the collection of industrial groups known as the Kigyo Shudan, and a further 30% is owned by networks of cross-shareholdings known as keiretsu. This results in stable ownership, lessening the potential for hostile takeovers and also "friendly" competition; companies are encouraged to excel but for the benefit of others as well as themselves.

== History ==
Japan is the only example of collective capitalism in practical form. It stems from Japan's economic and social restructuring following World War One. This program of industrial development was successful until the 1990s. Japan has the world's third-largest economy by purchasing power parity (PPP) and the second largest by market exchange rates.

Collective capitalism's influence can be seen elsewhere in modern Japan. Workers, particularly those who work for large businesses, become involved in their firms in ways unlike other capitalist systems. In return for loyalty and hard work, workers traditionally expect more from their employers than their western counterparts, including job security - often for life - pensions and social protection. This system of collective cooperation and the domination of the worker in corporate policy led to the Japanese system being dubbed "peoplism" by some critics. Japanese workers are typically given more benefits than most Western workers, because of this, working overtime in Japan is often viewed as aiding of devotion and determination rather than poor time management. However, such high benefits can discourage the creation of startups in Japan due to the increased amount of money for a small entrepreneur to invest in their startup.

== Criticism ==
Many critics voiced concerns that while collective capitalism often provides benefits for workers, it also placed a high demand on them and their families. Long hours and high levels of discipline are commonplace, resulting in high levels of stress and the emergence of karōshi, or "death by overwork", within the Japanese workforce.

== See also ==
- Capitalism
- Reform and opening up
- Corporate capitalism
- State-sponsored capitalism (East Asian model)

== Bibliography ==
- Heywood, Andrew (2002). Politics. Palgrave Macmillan. ISBN 0-333-97131-0.
