= Race to the bottom =

Economic competition scenario

Race to the bottom is a socio-economic concept describing a scenario in which individuals, companies, or governments compete by incrementally lowering standards or regulations to reduce costs in order to attract economic activity. This can include labor laws and enforcement, tax rates, and environmental regulations. The race to the bottom phenomenon is in contrast with traditional competition, which tends to improve goods and services.

The term "race to the bottom" can be traced back to the early 1900s, when United States Supreme Court Justice Louis Brandeis used the term in a court ruling. The metaphor would later be used by William Cary in an article in the Yale Law Journal, "Federalism and Corporate Law: Reflections Upon Delaware".

The race to the bottom hypothesis is the idea that countries compete by progressively lowering their regulatory standards to attract trade and investment. Whether the race to the bottom persists in global markets today is debated among academic circles, with empirical evidence supporting both sides. Additionally, the expansion of free trade in textiles in the early 21st century serves as a critical case study for the race to the bottom hypothesis in the global value chain. The implication of a race to the bottom on environmental policy is also strong, applying to both policy within the United States and around the world.

== Deregulation ==
The term has primarily been used to describe either government deregulation of the business environment or reduction in corporate tax rates, in order to attract or retain economic activity in their jurisdictions. While this phenomenon can happen between countries as a result of globalization and free trade, it also can occur within individual countries between their sub-jurisdictions (states, localities, cities). It may occur when competition increases between geographic areas over a particular sector of trade and production. The effect and intent of these actions is to lower labor rates, cost of business, or other factors (pensions, environmental protection and other externalities) over which governments can exert control.

This deregulation lowers the cost of production for businesses. Countries/localities with higher labor, environmental standards, or taxes can lose business to countries/localities with less regulation, which in turn makes them want to lower regulations in order to keep firms' production in their jurisdiction, hence driving the race to the lowest regulatory standards.

== History and usage ==
The concept of a regulatory "race to the bottom" emerged in the United States during the late 1800s and early 1900s, when there was charter competition among states to attract corporations to base in their jurisdiction. Some, such as Justice Louis Brandeis, described the concept as the "race to the bottom" and others, as the "race to efficiency".

In the late 19th century, joint-stock company control was being liberalised in Europe, where countries were engaged in competitive liberal legislation to allow local companies to compete. This liberalization reached Spain in 1869, Germany in 1870, Belgium in 1873, and Italy in 1883.

In 1890, New Jersey enacted a liberal corporation charter, which charged low fees for company registration and lower franchise taxes than other states. Delaware attempted to copy the law to attract companies to its own state. This competition ended when Governor Woodrow Wilson tightened New Jersey's laws through a series of seven statutes.

In academic literature, the phenomenon of regulatory competition reducing standards overall was argued for by A.A. Berle and G.C. Means in The Modern Corporation and Private Property (1932). The concept received formal recognition by the US Supreme Court in a decision of Justice Louis Brandeis in the 1933 case Ligget Co. v. Lee (288 U.S. 517, 558–559).

Brandeis's "race to the bottom" metaphor was updated in 1974 by William Cary, in an article in the Yale Law Journal, "Federalism and Corporate Law: Reflections Upon Delaware," in which Cary argued for the imposition of national standards for corporate governance.

Sanford F. Schram explained in 2000 that the term "race to the bottom":

...has for some time served as an important metaphor to illustrate that the United States federal system—and every federal system for that matter—is vulnerable to interstate competition. The "race to the bottom" implies that the states compete with each other as each tries to underbid the others in lowering taxes, spending, regulation...so as to make itself more attractive to outside financial interests or unattractive to unwanted outsiders. It can be opposed to the alternative metaphor of "Laboratories of Democracy". The laboratory metaphor implies a more sanguine federalism in which [states] use their authority and discretion to develop innovative and creative solutions to common problems which can be then adopted by other states.

The term has been used to describe a similar type of competition between corporations. In 2003, in response to reports that British supermarkets had cut the price of bananas, and by implication had squeezed revenues of banana-growing developing nations, Alistair Smith, international co-coordinator of Banana Link, said "The British supermarkets are leading a race to the bottom. Jobs are being lost and producers are having to pay less attention to social and environmental agreements."

Another example is the cruise industry, with corporations headquartered in wealthy developed nations but which registers its ships in countries with minimal environmental or labor laws, and no corporate taxes.

The term has also been used in the context of a trend for some European states to seize refugees' assets.

== Globalization and labor rights ==
The race to the bottom hypothesis is the idea that countries compete by progressively lowering each other's regulatory standards to attract trade and investment.

The race to the bottom hypothesis has raised questions about standardizing labor and environmental regulations across nations. There is a debate about if a race to the bottom is actually bad or even possible, and if corporations or nation states should play a bigger role in the regulatory process.

International Political Economy scholar Daniel Drezner (of Tufts University) has described the "race to the bottom" as a myth. He argues that the thesis incorrectly assumes that states exclusively respond to the preferences of capital (and not to other constituents, such as voters), state regulations are sufficiently costly for producers that they would be willing to re-locate elsewhere, and no state has an economy large enough to give it a bargaining power advantage over global capital. A 2022 study found no evidence that global trade competition led to a race to the bottom in labor standards.

A 2001 study by Geoffrey Garrett found that increases were associated with higher government spending, but that the rate of increase in government spending was slower in the countries with the highest increases in trade. Garrett concluded that increases in capital mobility had no significant impact on government spending. His 1998 book Partisan Politics in the Global Economy argues against the notion that globalization has undermined national autonomy. He also posits in the book that "macroeconomic outcomes in the era of global markets have been as good or better in strong left-labour regimes ('social democratic corporatism') as in other industrial countries."

Torben Iversen and David Soskice have argued that social protection and markets go hand-in-hand, as the former resolves market failures. Iversen and Soskice similarly see democracy and capitalism as mutually supportive. Gøsta Esping-Andersen argues against convergence by pointing to presence of a variety of welfare state arrangements in capitalist states. Scholars such as Paul Pierson, Neil Fligstein and Robert Gilpin have argued that it is not globalization per se that has undermined the welfare state, but rather purposeful actions by conservative governments and interest groups that back them. Historical institutionalist scholarship by Pierson and Jacob Hacker has emphasized that once welfare states have been established, it is extremely difficult for governments to roll them back, although not impossible. Nita Rudra has found evidence of a race-to-the-bottom in developing countries, but not in developed countries; she argued that this is due to the elevated bargaining power of labor in developed countries.

Studies covering earlier periods by David Cameron, Dani Rodrik and Peter Katzenstein have found that greater trade openness has been associated with increases in government social spending.

Layna Mosley argues that increases in capital mobility have not led to convergence, except on a few narrow issues that investors care about. In adjudicating default risk, inflation risk and currency risk, investors use a large number of macroeconomic indicators, which means that investors are unlikely to pressure governments to converge on policies. However, Jonathan Kirshner asserts that the hyper mobility of capital has led to considerably monetary policy convergence.

Hegemonic stability theorists, such as Stephen Krasner, Robert Gilpin, and Charles Kindleberger argue that globalization did not reduce state power. To the contrary, they advance that trade levels would decline if the state power of the hegemon declined.

There is evidence that race to the bottom has an impact on global labor rights. Mosley and Uno measured collective bargaining rights, where they found that trade openness and global supply chains are associated with poorer rights. However, they concluded that foreign direct investment (FDI) leads to stronger labor rights, thus indicating a race to the top. Davies and Vadlamannati found that developing countries compete based on enforcement of labor laws, not the labor laws themselves. They found the competition of lowering labor enforcement to be more present in countries that are not part of the Organisation for Economic Co-operation and Development (OECD) compared to OECD members. Olney concluded that FDI inflow into developing countries is negatively correlated with labor protections, but countries themselves do not compete against each other to lower these standards.

Historically, the global textile industry serves as a relevant case study of race to the bottom in labor standards. China’s joining of the World Trade Organization (WTO) in 2001, followed by the expiration of the Multifibre Arrangement (MFA) in 2005, led to a significant increase in the volume of textile exports by countries like China, India, and Pakistan. China further gained significant FDI at the expense of South-East Asian countries like Taiwan, Korea, and Japan. While this led to increased employment of millions of workers in China, wages remained competitively low to attract investment. China thus became the main supplier of textiles to the U.S. and European Union (EU). Chan found that Chinese cities that were less linked with the global economy had lower wages compared to cities that were more connected with global trade.

== Taxation ==
On 1 July 2021, when 130 countries backed an OECD plan to set a global minimum corporate tax rate, U.S. Treasury Secretary Janet Yellen called it a "historic day." She said, "For decades, the United States has participated in a self-defeating international tax competition, lowering our corporate tax rates only to watch other nations lower theirs in response... The result was a global race to the bottom: Who could lower their corporate rate further and faster?" However, in January 2025, the United States withdrew from the OECD Global Tax Deal following an executive order by President Donald Trump.

== Environmental policy ==
The race to the bottom has been a tactic widely used among states within the United States of America. The race to the bottom in environmental policy involves both scaling back policies already in place and passing new policies that encourage less environmentally friendly behavior. Some states use this as an economic development strategy, especially in times of financial hardship. For example, in Wisconsin, Governor Scott Walker decreased state environmental staff's capacity in order to accelerate the approval time for a proposed development. Pursuing a race to the bottom philosophy in environmental politics allows states to foster economic growth, but has great consequences for the environment of that state. Conversely, some states have begun to pursue a race to the top strategy, which stresses innovative environmental policies at the state level, with the hopes that these policies will later be adopted by other states. When a state pursues either a race to the bottom or a race to the top strategy, it speaks to its overall environmental agenda.

Races to the bottom pose a threat to the environment globally. Thomas Oatley raises the example of toxic waste regulations. It is expensive to treat chemical waste, so corporations wanting to keep production costs low, may move to countries which do not require them to treat their waste before dumping it. A more concrete example is the hydroelectric dam industry in South America. Gerlak notes that country and community desire for foreign investment in hydroelectric dams has created a race to the bottom in environmental regulations. All dam proposals go through an environmental impact assessment no matter which country or countries it will be implemented in. Each country has a different way of conducting these assessments and different standards the dams must meet for approval. The lack of standard environmental impact assessment standards has caused countries to streamline their environmental impact assessment processes in places like Brazil. In some cases, countries require the assessment only after a dam proposal has already been approved. Other countries allow private developers from foreign firms or foreign nations, such as China to submit the environmental impact assessment, which has the potential to omit certain environmental concerns in order to receive project approval and casts doubt on the legitimacy of the environmental impact assessment process. If environmental impact assessments are not done right there is a risk of dams causing severe social and environmental harm. Environmental impact assessments are not the only form of government regulation and dams in South America are just one example of a global trend in deregulation by states in order to bring in more foreign direct investment.

== See also ==
- Neijuan – Economic concept that describes an excess of competition
- Beggar thy neighbour – Economic improvement attempt that causes worse conditions for other countries
- Convergence (economics) – Hypothesis of faster per-capita income growth for poorer countries
- Downward harmonization – Economic and political term
- Economic abuse – Form of abuse
- Global workforce – International labor pool of workers
- Globalization – Increasing worldwide interdependence
- Flag of convenience – Registering a ship in a foreign country
- Free trade – Absence of government restriction on international trade
- Invisible hand – Concept in modern economics
- Law of rent – Economic principle regarding the value of rented land
- Market cannibalism
- Multinational corporation – Corporation operating in multiple countries
- Mutual recognition agreement – Optional foreign relation between two countries harmonious in some way
- Pollution haven hypothesis – Conjecture that businesses look for the cheapest option when locating factories abroad
- Prisoner's dilemma – Standard example in game theory
- Supply and demand – Economic model of price determination in a market
- Tragedy of the commons – Overuse of a shared resource
- Minimum corporate tax rate
