= Markup (business) =

Difference between the cost and the selling price of a good or service

Markup (or price spread) is the difference between the selling price of a good or service and its marginal cost. In economics, markups are the most direct way to measure market power: the extent to which a firm can influence the price at which it sells a product or service. A markup rule is the pricing practice of a producer with market power, where a firm charges a fixed mark-up over its marginal cost.

Markup is often expressed as a percentage over the cost. A markup is added into the total cost incurred by the producer of a good or service in order to cover the costs of doing business and create a profit. The total cost reflects the total amount of both fixed and variable expenses to produce and distribute a product. Markup can be expressed as the fixed amount or as a percentage of the total cost or selling price. Retail markup is commonly calculated as the difference between wholesale price and retail price, as a percentage of wholesale. Other methods are also used.

In labor economics, markdown refers to the ability of a firm to hold the price it pays for an input — usually labor — below the input's marginal product.

== Derivation of the markup rule ==
The "markup rule" can be derived for a firm with price-setting power by maximizing the following expression for profit:

$$\pi = P(Q)\cdot Q - C(Q)$$

where $Q$ is quantity sold, $P(Q)$ is an inverse demand function, and thereby the price at which Q can be sold given the existing demand, and $C(Q)$ is the total cost of producing Q. $\pi$ is economic profit.

Profit maximization means that the derivative of $\pi$ with respect to Q is set equal to 0:

$$P'(Q)\cdot Q+P-C'(Q)=0$$

where $P'(Q)$ is the derivative of the inverse demand function and $C'(Q)$ is marginal cost, the derivative of total cost with respect to output.

This yields:

$$P'(Q)\cdot Q + P = C'(Q)$$

or "marginal revenue" = "marginal cost".

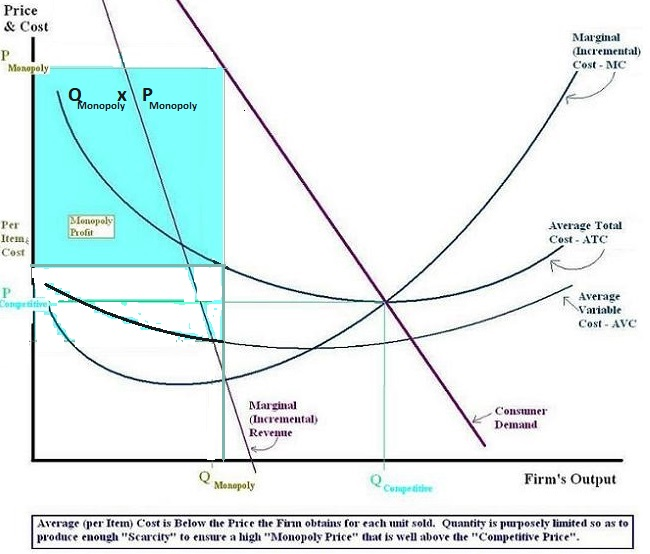
A firm with market power will set a price and production quantity such that marginal cost equals marginal revenue. A competitive firm's marginal revenue is the price it gets for its product, and so it will equate marginal cost to price.

$$P\cdot(P'(Q)\cdot Q/P+1)=MC$$

By definition $P'(Q)\cdot Q/P$ is the reciprocal of the price elasticity of demand (or $1/ \epsilon$). Hence

$$P\cdot(1+1/{\epsilon})=P\cdot\left(\frac{1+\epsilon}{\epsilon}\right)=MC$$

Letting $\eta$ be the reciprocal of the price elasticity of demand,

$$P=\left(\frac{1}{1+\eta}\right)\cdot MC$$

Thus a firm with market power chooses the output quantity at which the corresponding price satisfies this rule. Since for a price-setting firm $\eta<0$ this means that a firm with market power will charge a price above marginal cost and thus earn a monopoly rent. On the other hand, a competitive firm by definition faces a perfectly elastic demand; hence it has $\eta=0$ which means that it sets the quantity such that marginal cost equals the price.

The rule also implies that, absent menu costs, a firm with market power will never choose a point on the inelastic portion of its demand curve (where $\epsilon \ge -1$ and $\eta \le -1$). Intuitively, this is because starting from such a point, a reduction in quantity and the associated increase in price along the demand curve would yield both an increase in revenues (because demand is inelastic at the starting point) and a decrease in costs (because output has decreased); thus the original point was not profit-maximizing.

=== Numerical example ===
The following is a numerical example of cost-plus pricing, where prices are determined by an exogenously set markup.

- Cost × (1 + Markup) = Sale price

or solved for Markup = (Sale price / Cost) − 1
or solved for Markup = (Sale price − Cost) / Cost

- Assume the sale price is $1.99 and the cost is $1.40

Markup = ($1.99 / 1.40) − 1 = 42%
or Markup = ($1.99 − $1.40) / $1.40 = 42%

- To convert from markup to profit margin:

Sale price − Cost = Sale price × Profit margin
therefore Profit Margin = (Sale price − Cost) / Sale price
Margin = 1 − (1 / (Markup + 1))
or Margin = Markup/(Markup + 1)
Margin = 1 − (1 / (1 + 0.42)) = 29.5%
or Margin = ($1.99 − $1.40) / $1.99 = 29.6%

A different method of calculating markup is based on percentage of selling price. This method eliminates the two-step process above and incorporates the ability of discount pricing.

- For instance cost of an item is 75.00 with 25% markup discount.

75.00/(1 − .25) = 75.00/.75 = 100.00

Comparing the two methods for discounting:

- 75.00 × (1 + .25) = 93.75 sale price with a 25% discount

93.75 × (1 − .25) = 93.75 × .75 = 70.31(25)
cost was 75.00 and if sold for 70.31 both the markup and the discount is 25%

- 75.00 /(1 − .25) = 100.00 sale price with a 25% discount

100.00 × (1 − .25) = 100.00 × .75 = 75.00
cost was 75.00 and if sold for 75.00 both the profit margin and the discount is 25%

These examples show the difference between adding a percentage of a number to a number and asking of what number is this number X% of. If the markup has to include more than just profit, such as overhead, it can be included as such:

- cost × 1.25 = sale price

or

- cost / .75 = sale price

== In macroeconomics ==
In macroeconomics, markups are an element of the wage-setting/price-setting model (WS/PS), which explains how the labor market (workers and firms negotiating wages) determines the overall changes in the price level (inflation) in the economy. From the firm's perspective, the pricing equation $P = (1+\mu) W$, where $\mu$ is the markup over costs, explains how businesses set the prices for the goods and services they sell. $P$ is the average price level in the economy, and $W$ are workers' wages. In a perfectly competitive market, firms can't charge a markup. But in reality, firms have some monopoly power, so they mark up prices to make a profit.

Wages are determined by the wage setting relation $W = F(u,z) P^e$, where $u$ is unemployment, which negatively affects wages, and $z$ a "catch all variable" (e.g. labor market regulations) which positively affects wages. $P^e$ are expected prices. Workers don't care about the dollar amount; they care about what that dollar can buy (purchasing power). Because wage contracts are locked in for a certain period, workers negotiate based on what they expect things to cost in the future. If they expect high inflation, they will demand higher wages today.

By substituting the wage setting equation into the pricing equation, we get an aggregate supply curve: $P = P^e(1+\mu) F(u,z)$. This curve answers the question "What is the final price level if firms set their prices based on wages, and those wages are determined by worker bargaining power and expected prices?" If expected prices ($P^e$) go up, workers demand higher wages, so firms' labor costs rise and they raise actual prices ($P$). If unemployment ($u$) goes down, the economy is booming and workers are scarce. Workers demand higher wages, so again, their labor costs rise and they rais eprices ($P$). Finally, if firms' product market power (markups $\mu$) or workers' labor market power ($z$) increase, then either firms decide to take more profit, or workers gain more leverage to demand higher pay. Both scenarios result in higher costs for the end consumer, pushing the actual price level ($P$) up.

== See also ==
- Administered prices
- Cost-plus pricing
- Marketing
- Markup rule
- Pricing
