= Charter =

Grant of authority or rights

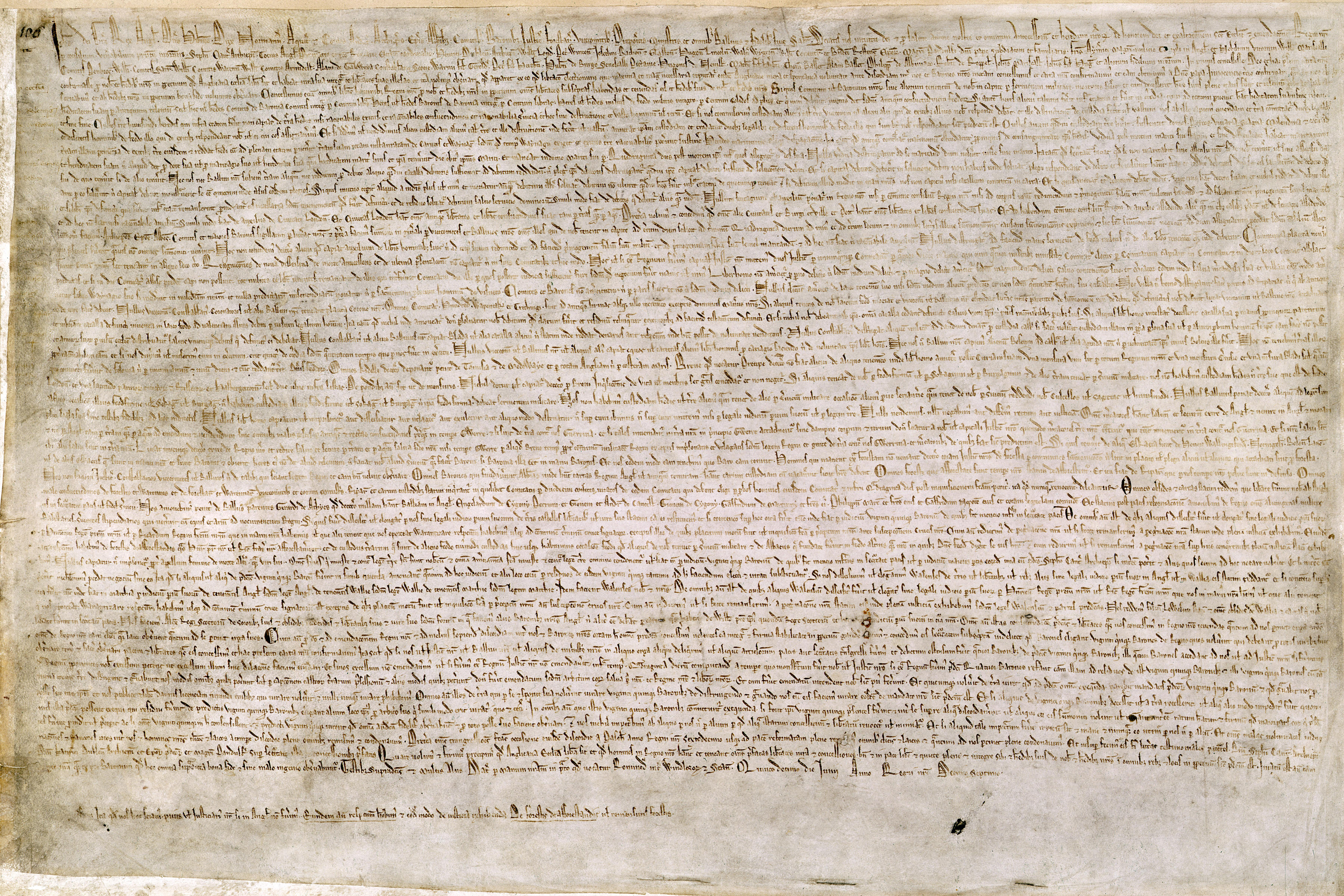
An example of a charter (Magna Carta).

A charter is the grant of authority or rights, stating that the granter formally recognizes the prerogative of the recipient to exercise the rights specified. It is implicit that the granter retains superiority (or sovereignty), and that the recipient admits a limited (or inferior) status within the relationship, and it is within that sense that charters were historically granted, and it is that sense which is retained in modern usage of the term. In early medieval Britain, charters transferred land from donors to recipients.

The word entered the English language from the Old French charte, via Latin charta, and ultimately from Greek χάρτης (khartes, meaning "layer of papyrus"). It has come to be synonymous with a document that sets out a grant of rights or privileges.

== Other usages ==
The term is used for a special case (or as an exception) of an institutional charter. A charter school, for example, is one that has different rules, regulations, and statutes from a state school.

Charter can be used as a synonym for "hire" or "lease", as in the "charter" of a bus, boat or plane.

A charter member (US English) of an organization is an original member; that is, one who became a member when the organization received its charter. A chartered member (British English) is a member who holds an individual chartered designation authorized under that organization's royal charter.

== Different types of charters ==
=== Anglo-Saxon charters ===
Anglo-Saxon charters (also called diplomas) are documents drawn up between the seventh century and 1066 in Britain, which typically make a grant of land or record a privilege. They are usually written on parchment, in Latin. Around 200 survive in their original form, and many of the others have been altered or forged. The oldest surviving charters granted land and privileges to the church, but from the 8th century surviving charters were increasingly used to grant land to lay people.

=== Colony charter ===
The British Empire used three main types of colonies as it sought to expand its territory to distant parts of the earth. These three types were royal colonies, proprietary colonies, and corporate colonies. A charter colony by definition is a "colony chartered to an individual, trading company, etc., by the British crown." Although charter colonies were not the most prevalent of the three types of colonies in the British Empire, they were by no means insignificant.

=== Congressional charter ===
A Congressional charter is a law passed by the United States Congress that states the mission, authority, and activities of a group. Congress issued federal charters from 1791 until 1992 under Title 36 of the United States Code.

=== Corporate charter ===
A corporate charter is a document or charter that establishes the existence of a corporation in the United States and Canada.

=== Inspeximus charter ===
A charter of "Inspeximus" (Latin, literally "We have inspected") is frequently a royal charter, by which an earlier charter or series of charters relating to a particular foundation (such as a monastery or a guild) was recited and incorporated into a new charter, usually in order to confirm and renew its validity under present authority. Where the original documents are lost, an inspeximus charter may sometimes preserve their texts and lists of witnesses.

=== Municipal charter ===
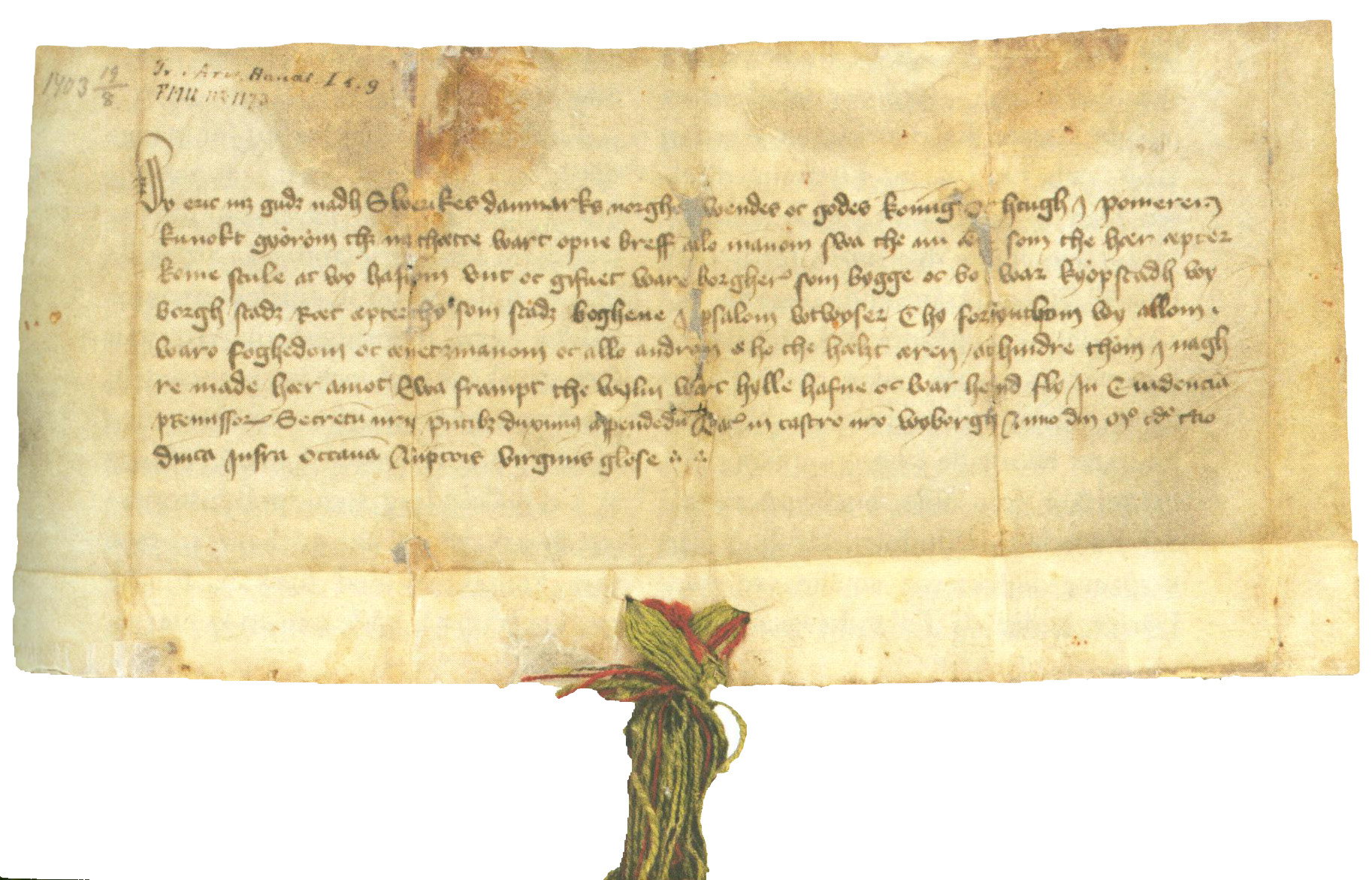
Swedish-language charter for the city of Viborg from 1403

A municipal corporation is the legal term for a local governing body, including (but not necessarily limited to) cities, counties, towns, townships, charter townships, villages, and boroughs. Municipal incorporation occurs when such municipalities become self-governing entities under the laws of the state or province in which they are located. Often, this event is marked by the award or declaration of a municipal charter, a term used because municipal power was historically granted by the sovereign, by royal charter.

=== Order charter ===
Charters may establish or govern the operation of chivalric orders and other orders, such as the Sovereign Military Order of Malta.

=== Project charter ===
In project management, a project charter (sometimes called the terms of reference) is provided by the sponsor to formally authorize the existence of a project. It provides a preliminary delineation of roles and responsibilities, outlines the project purpose and objectives, identifies key stakeholders, and defines the authority of the project manager. It serves as a reference of authority for future planning of the project. The project scope is developed from the project charter.

=== Royal charter ===
A royal charter is a formal grant issued by a monarch under royal prerogative as letters patent. Historically, they have been used to promulgate public laws, the most famous example being the English Magna Carta (great charter) of 1215, but since the 14th century have only been used in place of private acts to grant a right or power to an individual or a body corporate. They were, and are still, used to establish significant organisations such as boroughs (with municipal charters), universities and learned societies, and were used historically to establish companies.

The Charter of 1814, France's constitution during the Bourbon Restoration, was thus called to promote the legal fiction that the King had granted it "voluntarily, and by the free exercise of [his] royal authority", in the manner of medieval charters.

At one time a royal charter was the only way in which an incorporated body could be formed, but other means (such as the registration process for limited companies) are generally now used instead.

=== University charter ===
A university charter is a charter issued to create or recognise a university. The form of charter used varies by period and jurisdiction.

=== Uprising charter ===
In the context of a political uprising, a charter might lay out the basic principles and goals of the movement, define the organizational structure of the movement, and describe the roles and responsibilities of its members.

== See also ==
- Articles of association
- Atlantic Charter
- Certificate of incorporation
- Charter Roll
- Charter school
- Chartered company
- Collegium
- Earth Charter
- Freedom Charter
- Fueros (Spanish version)
- General incorporation law
- Magna Carta
- Medieval Bulgarian royal charters
- Papal Bull
- United Nations Charter
