= Gardiner Means =

American economist (1896–1988)

Gardiner Coit Means
- Born: June 8, 1896; Windham, Connecticut
- Died: February 15, 1988 (aged 91); Vienna, Virginia

Academic background
- Education: Harvard University

Academic work
- School or tradition: Institutional economics
- Notable ideas: Administered prices Collective capitalism

Gardiner Coit Means (June 8, 1896 – February 15, 1988) was an American economist who worked at Harvard University, where he met lawyer-diplomat Adolf A. Berle. Together they wrote the seminal work of corporate governance, The Modern Corporation and Private Property. During the New Deal, Means served as an economic adviser to Franklin D. Roosevelt and Henry A. Wallace.

== Academic work ==
Means followed the institutionalist tradition of economists. In 1934 he coined the term "administered prices" to refer to prices set by firms themselves, as contrasted with market prices, set for commodities like corn and oil in impersonal markets. In The Corporate Revolution in America (1962) he wrote:

"We now have single corporate enterprises employing hundreds of thousands of workers, having hundreds of thousands of stockholders, using billions of dollars' worth of the instruments of production, serving millions of customers, and controlled by a single management group. These are great collectives of enterprise, and a system composed of them might well be called "collective capitalism."

Means argued that where an economy is fueled by big firms it is the interests of management, not the public, that govern society.

== Bibliography ==
- The Modern Corporation and Private Property with Adolf A. Berle (1932)
- "Industrial Prices and their Relative Inflexibility" (1935)
- Patterns of Resource Use (1938)
- The Structure of the American Economy (1939)
- Pricing Power and the Public Interest (1962)
- The Corporate Revolution in America (1962)
- "Simultaneous Inflation and Unemployment: Challenge to theory and policy" (1975)
- The Heterodox Economics of Gardiner C. Means: A Collection. M.E. Sharpe. 1992. ISBN 978-0-87332-717-6.
- A Monetary Theory of Employment 1994.

== See also ==
- Administered prices
- History of economic thought
