= Adolf A. Berle =

Lawyer, educator, author and diplomat (1895-1971)

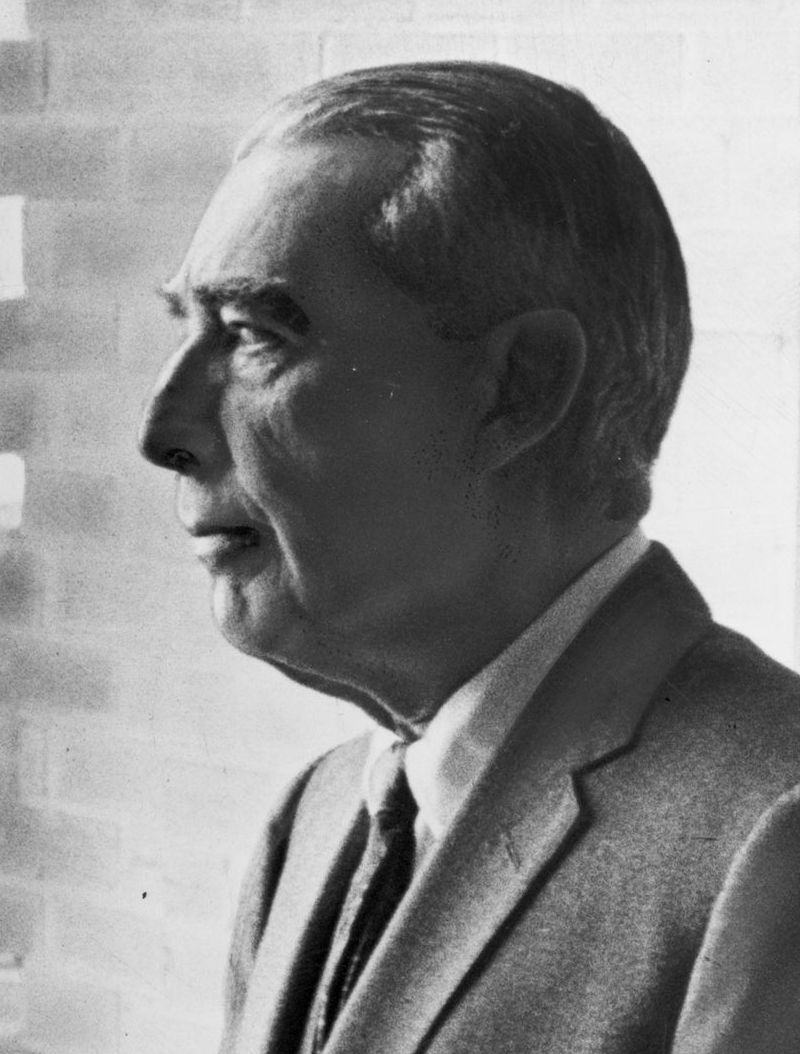
- Berle in 1965

United States Ambassador to Brazil
- In office January 30, 1945 – February 27, 1946
- President: Franklin D. Roosevelt; Harry S. Truman
- Preceded by: Jefferson Caffery
- Succeeded by: William D. Pawley

Assistant Secretary of State for Latin American Affairs
- In office March 5, 1938 – December 19, 1944
- President: Franklin D. Roosevelt

Chamberlain of New York City
- In office January 1, 1934 – March 5, 1938
- Preceded by: Charles Buckley
- Succeeded by: Office abolished

Personal details
- Born: Adolf Augustus Berle, Jr. January 29, 1895 Boston, Massachusetts
- Died: February 17, 1971 (aged 76) New York City, New York
- Spouse: Beatrice Bishop (1902–1993) (m. 1927–1971)
- Children: 3, including Peter
- Education: Harvard University (BA, MA, JD)
- Profession: Lawyer, diplomat, author, educator

Adolf Augustus Berle Jr. (/ˈbɜːrli/; January 29, 1895 – February 17, 1971) was an American lawyer, educator, writer, and diplomat. He was the author of The Modern Corporation and Private Property, a groundbreaking work on corporate governance, a professor at Columbia University, and an important member of US President Franklin Roosevelt's "Brain Trust."

== Early life ==
Berle was born in Boston, Massachusetts, the son of Mary Augusta (Wright) and Adolf Augustus Berle. He entered Harvard College at age 14, earning a bachelor's degree in 1913 and a master's degree in 1914. He then enrolled in Harvard Law School. In 1916, at age 21, he became the second youngest graduate in the school's history, behind only Louis Brandeis.

== Career ==
=== Early career ===
Upon graduation Berle joined the US Army. His first assignment as an intelligence officer was to assist in increasing sugar production in the Dominican Republic by working out property and contractual conflicts among rural landowners. Immediately after World War I, Berle became a member of the American delegation to the Paris Peace Conference, advocating for smaller nations' rights of self-determination. In 1919, Berle moved to New York City and became a member of the law firm of Berle, Berle and Brunner.

=== The Modern Corporation and Private Property ===
Berle became a professor of corporate law at Columbia Law School in 1927 and remained on the faculty until retiring in 1964. He is best known for his groundbreaking work in corporate governance that he co-authored, with economist Gardiner Means, The Modern Corporation and Private Property. It is the most quoted text in corporate governance studies. Berle and Means showed that the means of production in the US economy were highly concentrated in the hands of the largest 200 corporations, and within the large corporations, managers controlled firms despite shareholders' formal ownership. Berle theorized that the facts of economic concentration meant that the effects of competitive-price theory were largely mythical. While some advocated trust busting, breaking up the concentrations of firms into smaller entities to restore competitive forces, Berle believed that that would be economically inefficient. Instead, he argued for government regulation and became identified with the school of business statesmanship, which advocated that corporate leadership accept (and theorized that they had, to a great extent, already accepted) that they must fulfill responsibilities toward society in addition to their traditional responsibilities toward shareholders. Corporate law should reflect this new reality, he wrote in The Modern Corporation: "The law of corporations, accordingly, might well be considered as a potential constitutional law for the new economic state, while business practice is increasingly assuming the aspect of economic statesmanship."

=== Roosevelt's Brain Trust ===
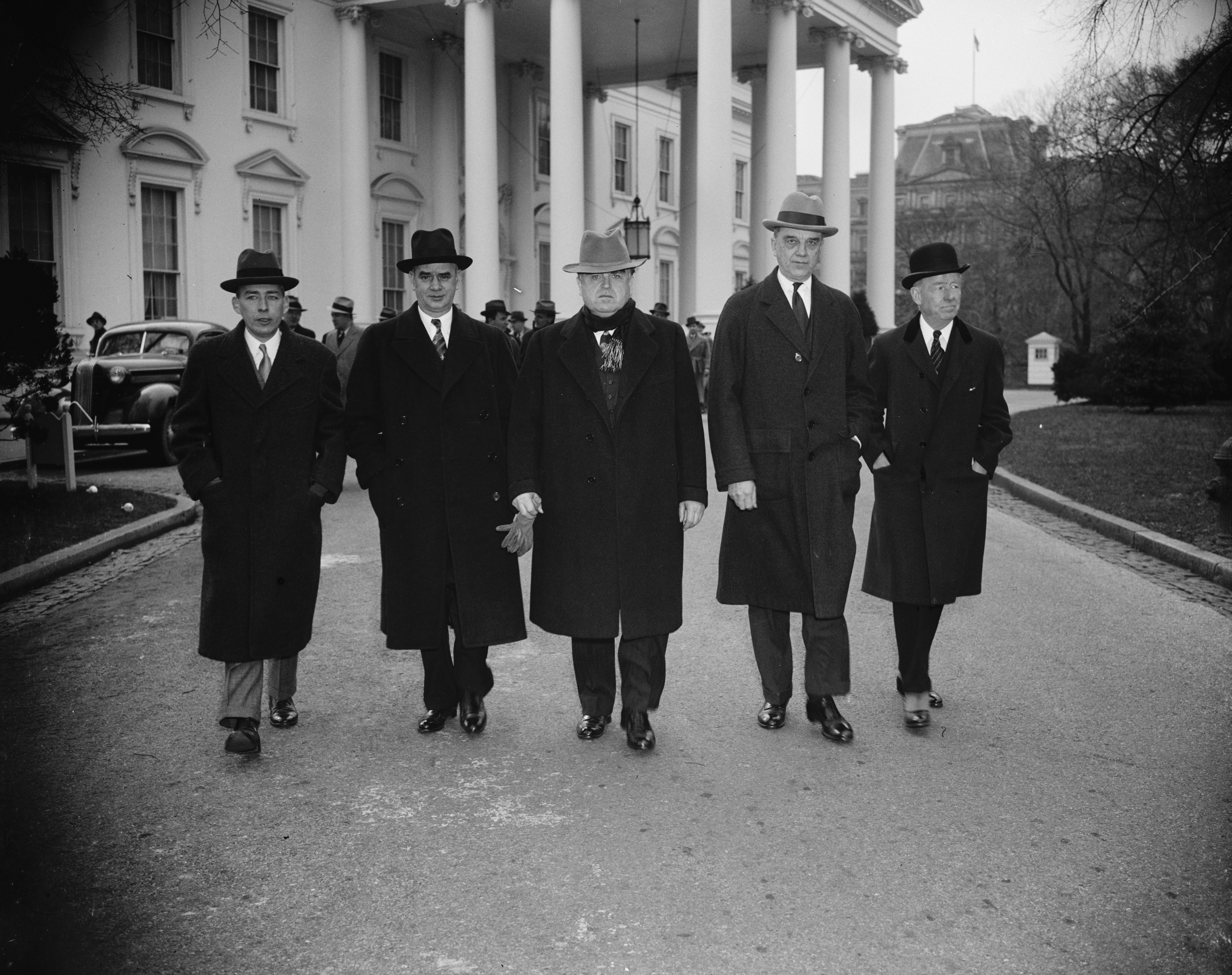
Labor and business leaders leaving the White House after a meeting with President Franklin D. Roosevelt, January 14, 1938. (L-R): Adolf A. Berle, Philip Murray, John L. Lewis, Owen D. Young, Thomas W. Lamont.

Berle was an original member of Franklin D. Roosevelt's "Brain Trust", a group of advisers who developed policy recommendations. Berle's focuses ranging from economic recovery to diplomatic strategy during Roosevelt's 1932 election campaign. Roosevelt's "Commonwealth Club Address", a speech written by Berle on government involvement in industrial and economic policy, was ranked in 2000 as the second-best presidential campaign speech of the 20th century by public address scholars. While remaining an informal adviser of Roosevelt after the election, Berle returned to New York City and became a key consultant in the successful mayoral election campaign of reformer Fiorello LaGuardia. From 1934 to 1938, Berle managed the city's fiscal affairs as its last Chamberlain. He was later appointed by La Guardia to the New York City Housing Authority, succeeding Baruch Charney Vladeck.

=== Assistant Secretary of State for Latin American Affairs ===
Then, from 1938 to 1944, Berle was Assistant Secretary of State for Latin American Affairs. Throughout the Roosevelt administration, Berle consulted on important international and industrial New Deal projects, such as the creation of the St. Lawrence Seaway, the development of the administration's Good Neighbor Policy toward Latin America, and the establishment of the International Civil Aviation Organization. Outside of Latin America, Berle argued "that control of the incomparable energy reserves of the Middle East would yield 'substantial control of the world.'" by 1941, Berle had charge of the intelligence activities in the State Department, working with the FBI in Latin America and the OSS in Europe. He was in touch with anti-fascist and anti-Communist Europeans, with the goal of building a liberal democratic coalition in Europe. Berle became entangled in incessant turf wars among intelligence agencies. Critics on the left accused him of being too hostile toward Moscow, and Secretary of State Cordell Hull was annoyed at his access to Roosevelt. In 1944 he was reassigned to take charge of negotiation with the Allies regarding a postwar commercial aviation agreement.

=== National Lawyers Guild ===
In 1939, Berle became an early member of the National Lawyers Guild (NLG). According to the NLG's A History of the National Lawyers Guild 1937-1987, two factions arose as early as 1940. External events heightening these tensions included the Hitler-Stalin Pact of September (1939), the Russian invasion of Finland (1940). One faction, led by Berle and Morris Ernst, supported New Deal policies. The other, led by Osmond Fraenkel and Thomas I. Emerson, supported freedom of speech and press as well as Anti-Fascism (seen at the time as a Popular Front stance, thus pro-Communist). Other issues supported by Fraenkel, Emerson, the National Executive Board and many chapters included: support for Loyalist Spain, criticism of J. Edgar Hoover and the FBI, and support for labor unions. Berle and Ernst recommended anti-communist oaths, which Fraenkel and Emerson opposed. Many Berle and Ernst supporters left the NLG by 1940. During the NLG's 1940 convention, newly elected president Robert W. Kenny of California and secretary Martin Popper of New York sought to persuade members to return. During a phone call from Kenny, Berle gave him a short list of lawyers to leave as a simple matter of "cleaning house": Kenny rejected the request.

=== Alger Hiss ===
During his tenure as Assistant Secretary of State, Berle rented Woodley Mansion, which had once been owned by Grover Cleveland and Martin Van Buren, from secretary of war Henry Stimson in 1939. On September 2, Whittaker Chambers arrived at Woodley to tell Berle that several senior government officials, including Alger Hiss, a respected member of the State Department, were members of a Soviet "apparatus" designed to influence US policy and pass classified documents and information to the Soviets. Chambers's autobiography asserts that Berle and the journalist who set up the meeting, Isaac Don Levine, met with Roosevelt and conveyed what Chambers told them, but Roosevelt unequivocally refused to take any action. Hiss remained at the State Department during and after the war in positions, including as Roosevelt's principal adviser on Soviet affairs at the Yalta conference, as a delegate to the Dumbarton Oaks Conference and as Secretary General of the San Francisco conference establishing the United Nations. In 1948, Chambers repeated his accusations to the House Committee on Un-American Activities. Hiss denied the accusation in testimony to the Committee, leading to his trial and conviction for perjury. Berle provided incorrect and misleading testimony before the House Committee about his meeting with Chambers, which was contradicted by both his notes taken subsequent to the meeting and a personal diary entry that acknowledged that Chambers had implicated Hiss in espionage. Explaining Berle's evasive testimony, Allen Weinstein wrote in his book Perjury: The Hiss-Chambers Case: "His major concern in 1948, at a time when Berle was a Liberal Party leader in New York working for Truman's election, was to defuse, if possible, the influence of anti-Communist sentiment and of the case itself in that election year."

In 1943, Berle's duties in the State Department involved political supervision of the various clandestine activities necessitated by the war. Working with his assistant Charles W. Yost, Berle liaised with the OSS, and with the Joint Intelligence Committee of the Joint Chiefs of Staff.

Berle also was a major architect in the development of federal farm and home owners' mortgage programs and in the expansion of the Reconstruction Finance Corporation. He was elected a Fellow of the American Academy of Arts and Sciences in 1944.

=== After World War II ===
After the war, Berle served as Ambassador to Brazil from 1945 to 1946. In October 1945, two days after the deposition of president Getúlio Vargas, Berle pledged for the freedom of the Brazilian communists who were being incarcerated by the government since the beginning of the month.

Berle served on the board of directors at the Society for the Investigation of Human Ecology, a front organization for the CIA’s MKUltra program. "I am frightened about this one," Berle wrote in his diary, regarding the organization's work on mind control. "If the scientists do what they have laid out for themselves, men will become manageable ants. But I don't think it will happen."

Berle was a founding member of the Liberal Party of New York, a breakaway faction of the American Labor Party, which had lost support as a result of its sponsorship of Congressman Vito Marcantonio, a Communist sympathizer. For nearly a decade, Berle served as chairman of the Liberal Party. His main goal was to fight off far-left and Communist influences. He also chaired the Twentieth Century Fund for the two decades following World War II.

Berle briefly returned to government service for the first half of 1961, serving under President John F. Kennedy as head of an interdepartmental task force on Latin American affairs. During that time, he was primarily involved in forming the US response to a newly communist Cuba, which included both the failed Bay of Pigs invasion and the initiation of the Alliance for Progress, an economic development policy aimed at the region.

Berle continued to write academic work related to corporate law. His article on "Property, Production and Revolution" was a key statement of the theory behind the Great Society program of President Lyndon B. Johnson. He was elected to the American Philosophical Society in 1965.

== Personal life ==
Adolf Berle married Beatrice Bishop (1902–1993), the daughter of Cortlandt Field Bishop (1870–1935) and Amy Bend (1870–1957), in 1927. Beatrice was the granddaughter George Hoffman Bend (1838–1900), a member of the New York Stock Exchange and prominent in New York Society. Adolf and Beatrice had two daughters and a son. He had ten grandchildren.

- Beatrice Van Cortlandt Berle, who married Dean Winston Meyerson in 1953.
- Alice Bishop Berle, who married Clan Crawford, Jr. in 1949.
- Peter Adolf Augustus Berle III (1937–2007), a lawyer and member of the New York Assembly who married Lila Sloane Wilde in 1960.

In 1971, Berle died in New York City, aged 76. His wife edited and published selections from his diaries posthumously in 1973 as Navigating the Rapids: From the Papers of Adolf A. Berle.

== Legacy ==
According to historian Ellis W. Hawley:

Of the “service intellectuals” helping to shape modern American government, Adolf Berle was one of the most brilliant, versatile, and influential. Moving in and out of governmental positions, attaching himself to rising men of power, and overwhelming weaker personalities with the sheer force of his intellect and the amazing breadth of his expertise, he helped to shape and Implement new policies in such diverse areas as corporate taxation, railroad reorganization, trade relations, sugar controls, Latin American affairs, and urban planning. Through his writings, moreover, he became a leading articulator and shaper of what later scholars would call “Corporate liberalism.” In The Modern Corporation and Private Property, he not only documented the rise of a managerial elite but set forth the possibility of its becoming a “neutral technocracy” imbued with an overriding sense of social responsibility and public trusteeship.

== Publications ==
Books

- Studies in the Law of Corporation Finance. Chicago: Callaghan and Co., 1928. Rpt. 1995, Buffalo: W.S. Hein & Co.
- Cases and Materials in the Law of Corporation Finance. St. Paul: West Pub. Co., 1930.
- (with Gardiner C. Means) The Modern Corporation and Private Property. Council for Research in the Social Sciences, Columbia University. New York: The Macmillan Co., 1932, 1933, 1934, 1935, 1937, 1940. Rev. Ed., 1968. Rpt. with a new intro. by Murray L. Weidenbaum and Mark Jensen, New Brunswick [New Jersey]: Transaction Pubs., 1991.
- (with Victoria J[ohanne]. Pederson) Liquid Claims and the National Wealth: An Exploratory Study in the Theory of Liquidity. Council for Research in the Social Sciences, Columbia University. New York: The Macmillan Co., 1934.
- New Directions in the New World. New York, London: Harper & Bros. Pubs., 1940.
- National Realism and Christian Faith. The Ware Lecture, Boston, 1940. American Unitarian Assn., Tracts, No. 356. Boston: American Unitarian Assn., [1940?].
- The Natural Selection of Political Forces (Rev. Ed. 1968 ed.). Lawrence: University of Kansas Press. 1950. Archived from the original on June 1, 2016 – via HathiTrust.
- The Emerging Common Law of Free Enterprise: Antidote to the Omnipotent State?. [Philadelphia]: Brandeis Lawyers' Society, 1951.
- The 20th Century Capitalist Revolution. New York: Harcourt, Brace & Co., 1954.
- Economic Power and the Free Society. Contribution to the discussion of the free society; Dec. 1957. New York: Fund for the Republic Pamphlets. 1957. Archived from the original on October 11, 2016 – via HathiTrust.
- Tides of Crisis: A Primer of Foreign Relations. Apollo Editions, A-56. New York: Reynal & Co.; London: The MacMillan Co., 1957. Rpt. 1975, Westport [Connecticut]: Greenwood Press.
- The Bank That Banks Built: The Story of Savings Banks Trust Company, 1933-1958. New York: Harper & Bros., Pubs., 1959.
- Power without Property: A New Development in American Political Economy. New York: Harcourt, Brace & Co., 1959.
- The Motive Power of Political Economy.. [New York]: New York Society for Ethical Culture, 1960.
- The Cold War in Latin America. The Brian McMahon Lectures, 1961. [Storrs (Connecticut)?, 1961?].
- Latin America: Diplomacy and Reality. New York: Published for the Council on Foreign Relations by Harper & Row, 1962. Rpt. Westport (Connecticut): Greenwood Press, 1982.
- The American Economic Republic. New York: Harcourt, Brace & World; London: Sidgwick and Jackson, 1963.
- If Marx Were To Return. Washington, D.C.: U.S. Information Service, 1965. Electronic copy from HathiTrust http://catalog.hathitrust.org/Record/009984714
- The Three Faces of Power. [Originally presented as the Carpentier Lectures, Columbia University, March 1967.] New York: Harcourt, Brace & World, 1967.
- Political trends in Brazil by Vladimir Reisky de Dubnic, foreword by Adolf A. Berle (Washington: Public Affairs Press, 1968)
- Power: Epilogue in America. New York: Harcourt, Brace & World, 1968. (Taken from the author's Power to be published in 1969, and "published as a New Year's greeting to friends of the author and the publisher.")
- Power. New York: Harcourt, Brace & World, 1969.
- Leaning against the Dawn: An Appreciation of the Twentieth Century Fund and Its Fifty Years of Adventure in Seeking To Influence American Development toward a More Effectively Just Civilization, 1919-1969. New York: Twentieth Century Fund, 1969.
- Navigating the Rapids, 1918–1971: From the Papers of Adolf A. Berle. Beatrice Bishop Berle, Travis Beal Jacobs, Eds. Max Ascoli, Intro. New York: Harcourt Brace Jovanovich, 1973.

Articles

- "Non-Voting Stock and Bankers Control" (1925–1926) 39 Harvard Law Review 673
- "Corporate Powers as Powers in Trust" (1931) 44 Harvard Law Review 1049
- "The Theory of Enterprise Entity" (1947) 47(3) Columbia Law Review 343
- "The Developing Law of Corporate Concentration" (1952) 19(4) University of Chicago Law Review 639
- "Constitutional Limitations on Corporate Activity-Protection of Personal Rights from Invasion Through Economic Power" (1952) 100 University of Pennsylvania Law Review 933
- "Control in Corporate Law" (1958) 58 Columbia Law Review 1212
- "Legal Problems of Economic Power" (1960) 60 Columbia Law Review 4
- "Modern Functions of the Corporate System" (1962) 62 Columbia Law Review 433
- "Property, Production and Revolution" (1965) 65 Columbia Law Review 1
- "Corporate Decision-Making and Social Control" (1968–1969) 24 Business Lawyer 149

== See also ==
- U.S. corporate law
- Corporate governance
- History of economic thought
- Berle-Dodd debate

== Sources ==
=== Secondary sources ===
- Bratton, William W. "Berle and Means reconsidered at the century's turn." Journal of Corporation Law 26 (2000): 737+.
- Eden, Robert. "On the Origins of the Regime of Pragmatic Liberalism: John Dewey, Adolf A. Berle, and FDR's Commonwealth Club Address of 1932." Studies in American Political Development 7.1 (1993): 74-150.
- Hawley, Ellis W. "Liberal: Adolf A. Berle and the Vision of an American Era." Reviews in American History (1990) 18#2 pp 229–234. online
- Kirkendall, Richard S. "A. A. Berle, Jr., Student of the Corporation, 1917-1932," Business History Review (1961) 35:43-58.
- Schwarz, Jonathan A. Liberal: Adolf A. Berle and the Vision of an American Era (1987) online free
- Stigler, George J., and Claire Friedland. "The literature of economics: The case of Berle and Means." Journal of Law and Economics 26.2 (1983): 237-268.
- Wang, Jessica. "Neo-Brandeisianism and the new deal: Adolf A. Berle, Jr., William O. Douglas, and the problem of corporate finance in the 1930s." Seattle University Law Review. 33 (2009): 1221+ online.
- Welch Jr, Richard E. "Lippmann, Berle, and the US Response to the Cuban Revolution." Diplomatic History 6.2 (1982): 125-144.
- Symposium: In Berle's Footsteps—A Symposium Celebrating the Launch of the Adolf A. Berle, Jr. Center on Corporations, Law & Society

=== Primary sources ===
- Berle, Adolf Augustus. Navigating the rapids, 1918-1971: from the papers of Adolf A. Berle. (Houghton Mifflin Harcourt Press, 1973).
- Berle, Beatrice Bishop. A life in two worlds: the autobiography of Beatrice Bishop Berle (1983), the wife of A A Berle. online

Diplomatic posts
Preceded by Jefferson Caffery	United States Ambassador to Brazil; 30 January 1945–27 February 1946	Succeeded by William D. Pawley
