= The Modern Corporation and Private Property =

1932 book by Adolf Berle and Gardiner Means

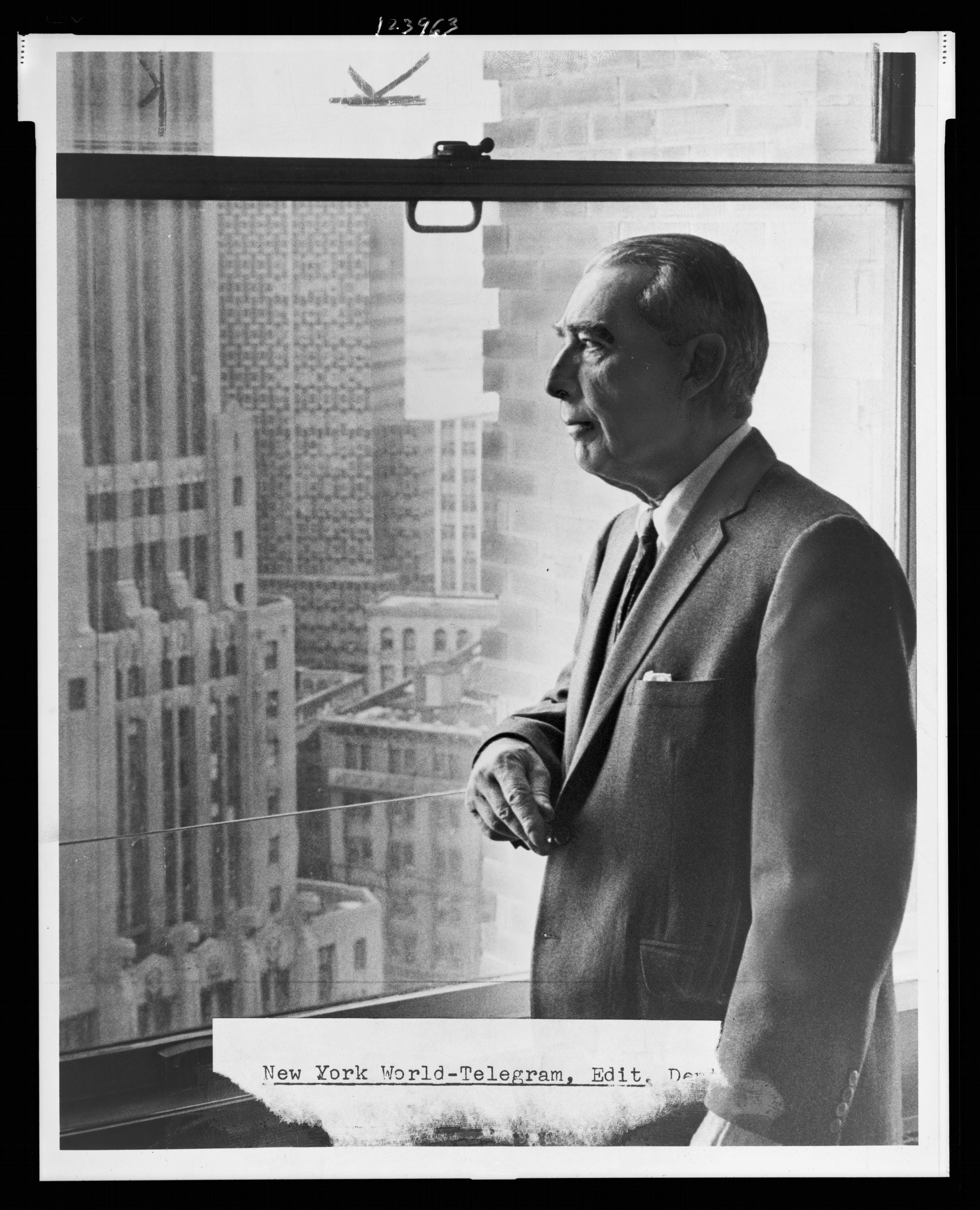
- Author: Adolf Berle and Gardiner Means
- Language: English
- Genre: Nonfiction
- Publisher: The Macmillan Company
- Publication date: 1932
- Publication place: United States
- Media type: Print
- OCLC: 258284924
- Dewey Decimal: 338.7/4/0973 20
- LC Class: HD2795 .B53

The Modern Corporation and Private Property is a book written by Adolf Berle and Gardiner Means published in 1932 regarding the foundations of United States corporate law. It explores the evolution of big business through a legal and economic lens, and argues that in the modern world those who legally have ownership over companies have been separated from their control. The second, revised edition was released in 1967. It serves as a foundational text in corporate governance, corporate law (company law), and institutional economics.

Berle and Means argued that the structure of corporate law in the United States in the 1930s enforced the separation of ownership and control because the corporate person formally owns a corporate entity even while shareholders own shares in the corporate entity and elect corporate directors who control the company's activities. The Modern Corporation and Private Property, first brought forward issues associated with the widely dispersed ownership of publicly traded companies. Berle and Means showed that the means of production in the US economy were highly concentrated in the hands of the largest 200 corporations, and within the large corporations, managers controlled firms despite shareholders' formal ownership. Compared to the notion of personal private property, say as one's laptop or bicycle, the functioning of modern company law “has destroyed the unity that we commonly call property.” This occurred for a number of reasons, foremost being the dispersal of shareholding ownership in big corporations: the typical shareholder is uninterested in the day-to-day affairs of the company, yet thousands of people like him or her make up the majority of owners throughout the economy. The result is that those who are directly interested in day-to-day affairs, the management and the directors, have the ability to manage the resources of companies to their own advantage without effective shareholder scrutiny.

“The property owner who invests in a modern corporation so far surrenders his wealth to those in control of the corporation that he has exchanged the position of independent owner for one in which he may become merely recipient of the wages of capital... [Such owners] have surrendered the right that the corporation should be operated in their sole interest...” “the owners most emphatically will not be served by a profit seeking controlling group”.

The implications of their work were clear. Berle and Means advocated embedded voting rights for all shareholders, greater transparency, and accountability. However, with the release of the revised edition, Berle and Means also pointed to the disparity that existed between those who did have shareholdings and those who did not.

== Introductory ==
Introduction by Murray Weidenbaum and Mark Jensen

Murray Weidenbaum and Mark Jensen have added their introduction to more recent editions of the text. It casts a thoroughly skeptical perspective on the book, since the two came from very different academic perspectives, generally more orthodox and conservative in their outlook politically.

Property, Production and Revolution - A Preface to the Revised Edition by Adolf A. Berle

For the 1967 Revised Edition, Berle added a new Preface, updating the picture and bringing in new arguments and observations. He summed up the whole point of the book at the same time, making it a valuable adjunct to the text. "Why have stockholders?" he asked.

"What contribution do they make, entitling them to heirship of half the profits of the industrial system, receivable partly in the form of dividends, and partly in the form of increased market values resulting from undistributed corporate gains? Stockholders toil not, neither do they spin, to earn that reward. They are beneficiaries by position only. Justification for their inheritance must be sought outside classic economic reasoning.”

The position of stockholders' profit, said Berle,

“can be founded only upon social grounds. There is... a value attached to individual life, individual development, individual solution of personal problems, individual choice of consumption and activity. Wealth unquestionably does add to an individual’s capacity and range in pursuit of happiness and self-development. There is certainly advantage to the community when men take care of themselves. But that justification turns on the distribution as well as the existence of wealth. Its force exists only in direct ratio to the number of individuals who hold such wealth. Justification for the stockholder’s existence thus depends on increasing distribution within the American population. Ideally the stockholder’s position will be impregnable only when every American family has its fragment of that position and of the wealth by which the opportunity to develop individuality becomes fully actualized.”

Implications of the Corporate Revolution in Economic Theory by Gardiner C. Means

Preface (1932)

Tables and charts

== Book I, Property in Flux ==
Book I is entitled, "Property in Flux: Separation of the attributes of ownership under the corporate system" and provides a general picture of the shifting economic power structure that Berle and Means observed.

=== I Property in transition ===
This first chapter explores the basic thesis of Berle and Means, that with the emergence of the corporation, the very institution of private property has been fundamentally altered.

“In its new aspect the corporation is a means whereby the wealth of innumerable individuals has been concentrated into huge aggregates and whereby control over this wealth has been surrendered to a unified direction. The power attendant upon such concentration has brought forth princes of industry, whose position in the community is yet to be defined. The surrender of control over their wealth by investors has effectively broken the old property relationships and has raised the problem of defining these relationship anew. The direction of industry by persons other than those who have ventured their wealth has raised the question of the motive force back of such direction and the effective distribution of the returns from business enterprise.”

“Such an organization of economic activity rests upon two developments, each of which has made possible an extension of the area under unified control. The factory system, the basis of the industrial revolution, brought an increasingly large number of workers directly under a single management. Then, the modern corporation, equally revolutionary in its effect, placed the wealth of innumerable individuals under the same central control. By each of these changes the power of those in control was immensely enlarged and the status of those involved, worker or property owner, was radically changed. The independent worker who entered the factory became a wage laborer surrendering the direction of his labor to his industrial master. The property owner who invests in a modern corporation so far surrenders his wealth to those in control of the corporation that he has exchanged the position of independent owner for one in which he may become merely recipient of the wages of capital.”

Berle and Means continue by emphasizing how increasing dispersion of stock ownership under a shareholder public is necessary for those in control to enforce their position. Even if they have minority shareholding, the public so widespread is not in a position to be organized to hold those who handle their investments to account. The divergence of interest between owners and controllers,

“has destroyed the unity that we commonly call property - has divided ownership into nominal ownership and the power formerly joined to it. Thereby the corporation has changed the nature of profit-seeking enterprise.”

“Private enterprise, on the other hand, has assumed an owner of the instruments of production with complete property rights over those instruments... Whereas the organization of feudal economic life rested upon an elaborate system of binding customs, the organization under the system of private enterprise has rested upon the self-interest of the property owner - a self-interest held in check only by competition and the conditions of supply and demand... Such self-interest has long been regarded as the best guarantee of economic efficiency. It has been assumed that, if the individual is protected in the right both to use his own property as he sees fit and to receive the full fruits of its use, his desire for personal gain, for profits, can be relied upon as an effective incentive to his efficient use of any industrial property he may possess.”

Shareholders, it is stated

“cannot be motivated by those profits to a more efficient use of the property, since they have surrendered all disposition of it to those in control of the enterprise.”

=== II The appearance of the corporate system ===
The second chapter puts forward the view that corporations have entered, grown and become dominant first in the fields of public utilities, common carriers, banks and insurance companies and last in the areas of personal service and agriculture.

It also goes on to emphasize the fact that the date of its appearance and degree of its dominance have in general varied with two factors

- The public character of the activity in question
- The amount of fixed capital required to carry on business

=== III The concentration of economic power ===
This part proceeds to emphasize the ubiquity of corporations in production in the modern economy.

“These great companies form the very framework of American industry. The individual must come in contact with them almost constantly. He may own an interest in one or more of them, he may be employed by one of them, but above all he is continually accepting their service.”

“In conclusion, then, the huge corporation, the corporation with $90m of assets or more, has come to dominate most major industries if not all industry in the United States.”

A number of consequences result, the fifth being that,

“The economic power in the hands of the few persons who control a giant corporation is a tremendous force which can harm or benefit a multitude of individuals, affect whole districts, shift the currents of trade, bring ruin to one community and prosperity to another. The organizations which they control have passed far beyond the realm of private enterprise - they have become more nearly social institutions.”

=== IV The dispersion of stock ownership ===
In this Chapter, Berle and Means present considerable statistical evidence of the growing dispersion of stock ownership around the economy. They draw a distinction between "passive" property, or that which merely sits idle or is consumed, and "productive" property, which is actually employed to create more wealth. They say,

“over the enterprise and over the physical property - the instruments of production - in which he has an interest, the owner has little control. At the same time he bears no responsibility with respect to the enterprise or its physical property. It has often been said that the owner of a horse is responsible. If the horse lives he must feed it. If the horse dies he must bury it. No such responsibility attaches to a share of stock. The owner is practically powerless through his own efforts to affect the underlying property... Physical property capable of being shaped by its owner could bring to him direct satisfaction apart from the income it yielded in more concrete form. It represented an extension of his own personality. With the corporate revolution, this quality has been lost to the property owner much as it has been lost to the worker through the industrial revolution.”

While land could be enjoyed whatever its market value, Berle and Means point out that shares cannot. The fact that so much wealth is in shares means we are tied to the market in a way we never have been before.

=== V The evolution of control ===
This chapter traces the power that shareholders have to control managers. The most important instrument is the vote, and they note,

“In contrast to non-voting preferred, the use of non-voting common stock has met with considerable disfavor. Both the New York Stock Exchange and the New York Curb have refused to list new issues of non-voting common stock; for practical purposes, this would seem to have eliminated the use of this device on any large scale in the immediate future.”

Berle and Means note the development of Voting trusts, which initially met bitter opposition, being declared illegal by courts. This was the practice whereby voting powers were transferred from the stockholder to a trustee for a fixed period. State legislatures were needed to authorize their use, after Delaware allowed them but other courts struck them down.

Berle and Means also deployed, uniquely, the concept of a shareholder's "rational apathy".

"the normal apathy of the small stockholder is such that he will either fail to return his proxy vote, or will sign on the dotted line, returning his proxy to the [management] of the corporation."

=== VI The divergence of interest between ownership and control ===
On the divergence of interest, Berle and Means' central question is,

“have we any justification for assumption that those in control of a modern corporation will also choose to operate it in the interests of the owners? The answer to this question will depend on the degree to which the self-interest of those in control may run parallel to the interests of ownership and, insofar as they differ, on the checks on the use of power which may be established by political, economic, or social conditions... If we are to assume that the desire for personal profit is the prime force motivating control, we must conclude that the interests of control are different from and often radically opposed to those of ownership; that the owners most emphatically will not be served by a profit-seeking controlling group.”

== Book II, Regrouping of Rights ==
Book II's full title is, "Regrouping of Rights: Relative legal position of ownership and "control“". Its subject is to explore the change in the balance of power between shareholders and the board of directors.

=== I Evolution of the modern corporate structure ===
Berle and Means begin by setting the context of the company's formation. Originally the company was granted privileges to be a separate legal person and carry on business, to sue and be sued and these rights usually went with the grant of a monopoly. The monopolies were no longer used now. But then came the easy registration of companies and limited liability for stockholders.

“From all this necessarily flowed a limited liability of the associates. Since only the entity was liable for debts, which did not attach to the various individuals, it followed that a stockholder was not normally liable for any of the debts of the enterprise; and he could thus embark a particular amount of capital in the corporate affairs without becoming responsible beyond this amount, for the corporate debts.”

In the United States, particularly at the time Berle and Means were writing they noted two things which particularly compromised shareholder's power: vote by proxy and restrictions on removing directors. So far as for what objectives the company pursues they say,

“The present corporation’s objects and the nature of the business in which (so far as the charter goes) it can engage are commonly limited only by the imagination of its organizing attorneys and their ability to embrace the world within the limits of the English language.”

=== II Power over participation accruing to shares of stock ===
"The conclusion that can be drawn (from this chapter) is that the share of stock, while it represents a participation in corporate assets, does so subject to so many qualifications that the distinctness of the property right has been blurred to the point of invisibility. For protection the stockholder has only a set of expectations that the men who compose the management and control will deal fairly with his interest. He must rely for the most part not on legal rights but on economic significances – on an accumulation of conditions which will make it desirable or advantageous for the purposes of the administration of the corporation to recognize a participation more or less meeting his expectation."

=== VIII The resultant position of the stockholder ===
Berle and Means contrast the position of the owner of shares (passive property) and the owner of a horse (an example of active property). The one with the horse is ‘married’ to his physical property and must take responsibility for it. The stockholder's position is different.

“The liquidity of property thus turns upon the determination of a market price and the mechanism for such price-determining is the open market. Curious as it may seem, the fact appears to be that liquid property, at least under the corporate system, obtains a set of values in exchange, represented by market prices, which are not immediately dependent upon, or at least only obliquely connected with, the underlying values of the properties themselves.”

== Book III, Property in the Stock Markets ==
Book III's full title is "Property in the Stock Markets: Security exchanges as appraisers and liquidators".

== Book IV, Reorientation of Enterprise ==
Book IV, entitled "Reorientation of Enterprise: Effects of the corporate system on fundamental economic concepts" is the shortest and aims to reassess some basic concepts in economic theory in light of the emergence of the corporation.

=== I The traditional logic of property ===
The traditional logic of property is that one will get all the gains and bear the losses associated with ownership. But now, since ownership has been separated from control, this no longer holds true.

=== II The traditional logic of profits ===
The traditional logic of profits, say Berle and Means, is that one will be motivated by the prospect of profiting from one's property. But again, with the separation of ownership from control, it is possible for managers to profit without working in shareholders' interests.

“Where such a separation is complete one group of individuals, the security holders and in particular the stockholders, performs the function of risk-takers and suppliers of capital, while a separate group exercises control and ultimate management. In such a case, if profits are to be received only by the security holders, as the traditional logic of property would require, how can they perform both of their traditional economic roles? Are no profits to go to those who exercise control and in whose hands the efficient operation of enterprise ultimately rests? ...Furthermore, if all profits are earmarked for the security holder, where is the inducement for those in control to manage the enterprise efficiently? When none of the profits are to be received by them, why should they exert themselves beyond the amount necessary to maintain a reasonably satisfied group of stockholders.”

=== III The inadequacy of traditional theory ===
Berle and Means go right back here to Adam Smith's oft cited disdain for joint stock companies, the idea that "negligence and profusion" would always prevail. They again emphasise the distinction between active and passive property.

=== IV The new concept of the corporation ===
This concluding part brings together the general thesis of the book. They finish by saying,

"The rise of the modern corporation has brought a concentration of economic power which can compete on equal terms with the modern state - economic power versus political power, each strong in its own field. The state seeks in some aspects to regulate the corporation, while the corporation, steadily becoming more powerful, makes every effort to avoid such regulation... The future may see the economic organism, now typified by the corporation, not only on an equal plane with the state, but possibly even superseding it as the dominant form of social organization. The law of corporations, accordingly, might well be considered as a potential constitutional law for the new economic state, while business practice is increasingly assuming the aspect of economic statesmanship.”

Appendixes

Statistical Appendix to Revised Edition by Gardiner C. Means

Table of Cases

Table of Companies

== See also ==
- History of economic thought
