= CWM FX =

British foreign exchange trading firm

- Type: Private limited company
- Industry: Financial services
- Headquarters: London, England
- Key people: Anthony Constantinou Craig Droste
- Products: Foreign exchange
- Website: cwmfx.com

CWM FX was a foreign exchange trading firm located at the Heron Tower at 110 Bishopsgate, otherwise known as Salesforce Tower. Dealing at the firm was suspended in March 2015 following a police raid on the firm and 13 arrests. There have been no convictions relating to these arrests as of 15 June 2015. CEO Anthony Constantinou was convicted in 2016 of sexual assault and sentenced to serve 12 months in jail. London Police later revealed that most of the company's revenue came from a £50m alleged Ponzi scheme which promised returns of 5% per month.

== Operations ==
The firm formerly used the foreign exchange trading "white label" trading platform of Leverate Financial Services Limited, a Cyprus Investment Firm (CIF) licensed and regulated by the Cyprus Securities and Exchange Commission that operated in London using the MiFID rules of the European Community. It operated a "straight through processing" model for retail traders in foreign exchange to trade Currency Pairs and Contract For Difference (CFDs).

== People ==
The founder of the CWM group of companies is Anthony Gregory Constantinou. Constantinou was born in 1981 and educated at Deree College where he obtained the degree of Bachelor of Business Administration (2000-2003). He was chief executive officer of AC Enterprises Limited (September 2005 to December 2012). In 2013 he was a director of Aixia Limited (trading as T4X Binary or T4X Signals) about which the Financial Conduct Authority issued a warning in 2014. He has served as a director of 24 companies, all of which have been dissolved.

Anthony Constantinou is the youngest son of Aristos Constantinou who was shot on New Year's Day 1985. In October 2016, Anthony Constantinou was found guilty of two counts of sexual assault at the Old Bailey, in what was described in court, as Wolf of Wall Street style behaviour. He was sentenced to 12 months imprisonment on 1 December 2016.

Craig James Droste was a director of CWM Trading Limited and CWM FX Limited and 2 other companies, all of which have been dissolved. He was born in 1984 and educated at the University of Stellenbosch and has a background in yacht management.

Sarah Tien is Head Of Finance of CWM Trading Limited. She attended Loughborough University and previously worked for Price Waterhouse Coopers.

== Police raid ==
CWM FX's trading platform was terminated by Leverate following a police raid on the CWM FX offices on 3 March 2015 that resulted in 13 arrests on suspicion of fraud by false representation, conspiracy to defraud, and money laundering. All those arrested were bailed until September 2015. City of London police detective superintendent Maria Woodall said: "The primary objective of the arrest phase of this investigation was to stop what we believe was ongoing criminality and prevent people putting their money into CWM's managed funds offering 5% interest per month." CWM FX said "Despite requests made of the police, they have thus far failed to provide the name of a single investor who has raised concerns with them."

CWM FX has described itself as unfairly caught up in attempts to close down "boiler-room" frauds which they say they are not, but other reports in the media have claimed the raid is related to connections between CWM FX and Belvedere Management which has recently been the subject of adverse publicity.

According to reports in City A.M., the company's plans for expansion in Manchester have been disrupted by the consequential effects of the police raid.

== Aftermath ==
In May 2015, further details of alleged criminality by CWM FX emerged with reports of a scam targeting the Gurkha community in the UK that offered a promised return of 5% per month.

In July 2016 it was reported by OffshoreAlert that DMS Bank in the Cayman Islands and a British Virgin Islands domiciled client of the bank were being sued by 318 people who claimed to have lost £50 million on investments with CWM Group.

== Sponsorship ==
The firm is known for its sports sponsorship deals which include boxing and being the "online forex trading partner" of Chelsea Football Club. The agreement with Chelsea was terminated following the police raid.

Other deals include sponsoring the CWM LCR Honda MotoGP racing team, Wigan Warriors rugby team, and SV Racing, which will participate in the Renault Clio Cup in 2015. The deal with CWM LCR Honda is reported to have been for 6.3 million Euros, two thirds of which motor sport sources believe may already have been paid.

In November 2014 it was announced that CWM FX had become the title sponsor for the London Boat Show and from 2015 the show would be known as the CWM FX London Boat Show.

== See also ==
- Belvedere Management group
- Cobus Kellermann
- David Cosgrove
- Kenneth Maillard
