= William Redford =

British businessman (born 1958)

- Born: 1958 (age 67–68)
- Occupation: Businessman

William Francis Redford (born 1958) is a British businessman. He is the chief executive, since October 2014, of Eligere Investments plc, a company formerly traded on the GXG Market in Denmark.

== Early career ==
Redford worked for Frahuil S.A., then Phillip Brothers, the commodity trading division of Salomon Brothers, trading vegetable oil. At Philip Brothers he was head of the vegetable oil trading desk. Redford has also worked as an interdealer broker in European government bonds.

== Kijani Resources and Eligere Investments ==
In September 2014, Redford became a non-executive director of AIM listed LP Hill plc, now known as Emerging Market Minerals plc, as a representative of Kijani Resources Limited.

In October 2014, Redford was appointed chief executive and chairman of Eligere Investments plc, a company traded on the GXG Market in Denmark. Trading in the company's shares was suspended by GXG in early June 2015. The UK's Financial Conduct Authority has warned that Eligere may be providing financial services or products in the UK without their authorisation.

Following a reorganisation in April 2015, the ordinary shares of Eligere Investments were 67% owned by Kijani Resources Limited, a special purpose vehicle of the Kijani Commodity Fund that is a segregated portfolio of the Brighton Segregated Portfolio Company (SPC) based in the Cayman Islands. On 1 June 2015, the Cayman Islands Monetary Authority announced that Brighton SPC had been placed in Controllership following a forensic examination of the fund by accountants.

In June 2015, Redford resigned from Emerging Market Minerals plc following the actions of the Cayman Islands Monetary Authority.

== Advalorem Value Asset Fund ==
In September 2015, a judge in the Supreme Court of Gibraltar imposed a worldwide freezing order on Redford's assets in connection with an alleged claim of fraud relating to Advalorem Value Asset Fund Limited.

== Other appointments ==
Redford is managing director of Mareeba Group Limited and has a number of other current and former company appointments. He is a director of Silex (UK) Limited and a former director of Silex Fund PCC Limited (in liquidation).

== See also ==
- Belvedere Management
