= Eligere Investments =

Company that traded in environmental services

Eligere Investments plc
- Company type: Public
- Founded: 2013; 12 years ago
- Defunct: April 2020
- Fate: Liquidation

Eligere Investments plc was a company that traded in environmental services such as the generation, provision and distribution of voluntary carbon offsets. The company received a warning from the UK's Financial Conduct Authority that it may be providing financial services or products in the UK without authorisation. The company became insolvent in 2017 and was liquidated in April 2020.

== History ==
As of October 2014, William Redford is the company's chief executive officer.

The company was formerly traded on the GXG Market in Denmark but trading in the company's shares was suspended by GXG in early June 2015.

Following a reorganisation in April 2015, the ordinary shares of Eligere Investments were 67% owned by Kijani Resources Limited, a special purpose vehicle of the Kijani Commodity Fund that is a segregated portfolio of the Brighton Segregated Portfolio Company (SPC) based in the Cayman Islands. On 1 June 2015, the Cayman Islands Monetary Authority announced that Brighton SPC had been placed in Controllership following a forensic examination of the fund by accountants. The controllers now have complete authority over the fund in order to protect the interests of investors and creditors.

The UK's Financial Conduct Authority has warned that Eligere may be providing financial services or products in the UK without their authorisation. The company became insolvent in 2017 and was liquidated in April 2020.

== See also ==
- Belvedere Management
- Fulhold Pharma
