= Fulhold Pharma =

British pharmaceutical company

Fulhold Pharma logo

Fulhold Pharma Limited (formerly Fulhold Pharma plc) is a British pharmaceutical company. It produces the patented CarboHydrate Derived Fulvic Acid (CHD-FA) and formulations containing this product.

== History ==
Fulhold Pharma was incorporated in February 2014. The main reason was to consolidate its predecessor, Fulhold Ltd (BVI) and its other operations, and to create a vehicle for raising further funding.

Fulhold Pharma’s Intellectual Property is a biological platform technology with a wide range of applications in human and animal health. This was developed over a period of 10 years prior to the incorporation of Fulhold Pharma. The molecule that is at the heart of this biological platform is CarboHydrate Derived Fulvic Acid (CHD-FA).

CHD-FA is a broad-spectrum anti-microbial/anti-inflammatory compound active on drug resistant Gram positive, Gram negative, and fungal pathogens that can be both ingested and topically applied. CHD-FA in combination with lower levels of antibiotics has demonstrated the same efficacy as higher levels of the same antibiotics alone.

The company's shares were admitted for trading on the GXG Market on 14 April 2015. Trading was suspended on 3 June 2015 at a price of 1.40 GBP and a market capitalisation of $108.9 million. According to financial media group, MoneyWeb, the trading suspension was due to "fallout from the investigations into companies with links to Belvedere Management." A June 2015 article in BizNews described Belvedere Management as one of "four dubious British shell companies." Shareholders include founding director David Cosgrove, who resigned in March 2015, as well as Dualstar Capital Private Equity Fund and the Alexander High Yield Fund. A regulatory investigation by the Guernsey Financial Services Commission (GFSC) downgraded these original accusations to technical administrative breaches and ended in 2017 without any action being taken. A parallel investigation in Mauritius is currently facing legal challenge.

In August 2015, the company acquired Ful Hold Limited which had worked on a topical drug for wounds with Euprotec in 2013.

== Products ==
Fulhold Pharma is a British pharmaceutical company with its manufacturing plant located in South Africa. Fulhold Pharma's Intellectual Property is a biological molecule, CarboHydrate Derived Fulvic Acid (CHD-FA) and is manufactured as an ingredient in medications.

Research into CHD-FA's broad-spectrum anti-microbial/anti-inflammatory agency on drug-resistant Gram positive, Gram negative, and fungal pathogens through ingestion and topical application includes:

- action in the treatment for Alzheimer's at the Medicine School of the Universidad Andres Bello in Chile by a team under Alberto Cornejo,
- as a mouthwash with specific anti fungal properties, and
- as a topical broad-spectrum anti-microbial treatment for Drug-Resistant Wound Infections, the latter in association with the Defence Technical Military Centre of the US Department of Defence.

== Administration ==
A 2015 company press release listed David Squire as chief executive officer and chairman and Stephen Leivers as founder and chief scientific officer.

== See also ==
- Eligere Investments
