= Business organization =

Business organization may refer to:

- Business organizations - covering the types of business entities which exist
- Business#Business organization - covering the ways in which a business can be organized.
