= Kenneth Maillard =

Mauritian accountant (born 1972)

- Born: 1972 (age 53–54)
- Occupation: Accountant
- Known for: Belvedere Management group

Kenneth Jean Georgy Maillard (born 1972) is a Mauritian accountant who is one of the principals of the Belvedere Management group.

== Career ==
Maillard worked for the offshore department of Arthur Andersen Mauritius and other companies. He is the co-founder and managing director of Belvedere Management Limited and serves as its managing director. Since 2007 he has been a non-executive director of TransAfrika Resources Limited. Maillard is also a director of Fulhold Pharma plc subsidiary Ful Hold Ltd.

== Professional affiliations ==
Maillard is a fellow of the Association of Chartered Certified Accountants and also an associate member of the Society of Trusts and Estate Planners.

== See also ==
- Cobus Kellermann
- David Dawson Cosgrove
- Richard Fagan (polo)
