= Ross Roberts =

Ross Roberts may refer to:

- Ross Thompson Roberts (1938–1987), United States federal judge
- Ross Roberts (sport shooter), Bermudian 50m prone rifle shooter
