= David Marchant (journalist) =

British journalist

- Born: 1965 (age 60–61)
- Occupation: Journalist
- Known for: Investigative reporting
- Website: www.offshorealert.com

David E. Marchant (born 1965) is a journalist, editor and owner of OffshoreAlert, a news service and conference organizer that specializes in exposing financial crimes before they occur.

== Early life and career ==
Marchant was born in 1965, started as a news reporter for The Gwent Gazette (1985–1987) in Ebbw Vale, Wales. He then worked as a reporter for the Bournemouth Evening Echo (1987–1989) and the Western Daily Press (1989–1990). From 1990 to 1993, he was a business reporter for The Royal Gazette in Bermuda. From 1994 to 1996, he was business editor at the Bermuda Sun.

== OffshoreAlert ==
In 1997, Marchant established KYC News Inc, doing business as OffshoreAlert. Since its founding, he has faced legal action in the United States, the Cayman Islands, Canada, and Panama. Additionally, former Prime Minister Keith Mitchell sued him in Grenada. Marchant has said that all of his stories are approved by a lawyer before publishing.

Marchant's stories have covered a Ponzi scheme at First International Bank of Grenada, a fraud case at the Cayman Islands based Axiom Legal Financing Fund, and alleged irregularities at Belvedere Management Group and a Spain-based investment group operating as Privilege Wealth.

In 2009, The Wall Street Journal reported that 11 people had been charged with crimes as a result of his work, of whom five have been jailed. Marchant was sued by Marc Harris, who was subsequently sentenced to 17 years in jail for money laundering and tax evasion.

== Legal issues ==
In 2004, ''OffshoreAlert'' published a report alleging that Prime Minister Keith Mitchell had accepted $500,000 for appointing a U.S. national to a diplomatic position. Mitchell denied the report, saying he had done nothing improper. Later, the opposition National Democratic Congress held a press conference denouncing the alleged corruption of the government, as reported in ''OffshoreAlert''. The Grenadian's Government Information Service then issued a warning that media outlets that broadcast or published the content of the press conference could face legal action. Within a few days, the government had filed a criminal libel lawsuit in Grenada brought by the prime minister against ''OffshoreAlert'' and its publisher, Marchant, a British national.

In 2011, Roland Bleyer filed a defamation complaint against him and his company. This lawsuit was similarly dismissed due to a failure to prosecute (FWOP).

In 2016, Fedor Sannikov filed a defamation lawsuit against him and his company, which was subsequently dismissed at a FWOP (failure to prosecute) hearing.

Marchant boasts that "We've never lost a libel action, never published a correction or apology to any plaintiffs and never paid — or been required to pay — them one cent in costs or damages".
