= Business organizations =

Business organizations is an area of legal study that covers the broad array of rules governing the formation and operation of different kinds of entities by which individuals can organize to do business. The term is also used to describe the entities themselves. A variety of other terms are used fairly interchangeably to describe this area, including business associations, business forms, and business entities. Reference to a "business" entity usually (though not always) indicates that entity's status as for-profit, as opposed to non-profit.

== Common types ==
The law of business organizations originally derived from the common law of England, but has evolved significantly in the Twentieth Century. In common law countries today, the most commonly addressed forms are:

- The sole proprietorship
- The partnership, sometimes called a "general partnership".
- The limited partnership (LP).
- The Limited-Liability Limited Partnership (LLLP)
- The limited liability partnership (LLP).
- The Profit Corporation (Inc., Co., Corp.).
- The Limited-Liability Company (LLC, Ltd.)
- The non-profit Corporation
- The Corporation sole

Less commonly used business forms include the limited liability limited partnership (LLLP), the Series LLC, and the limited company (LC). The proprietary limited company is a statutory business form unique to Australia.

Other types of business organisations, such as cooperatives, credit unions and publicly owned enterprises, can be established with purposes that parallel, supersede, or even replace the profit maximization mandate of business corporations. It has been noted that in the United States, the law of business organizations is a "quintessential example of interstate commerce [that] is principally a function of state law".

Other business forms are available in civil law countries, such as the German Gesellschaft mit beschränkter Haftung (GmbH) and Aktiengesellschaft (AG); and the S.A., a form used in a number of countries which translates from various languages into the equivalent of anonymous society or anonymous company.

== Attributes ==
As theorists such as Ronald Coase have pointed out, all business organizations represent an attempt to avoid certain costs associated with doing business. Each is meant to facilitate the contribution of specific resources—investment capital, knowledge, relationships, and so forth—towards a venture which will prove profitable to all contributors.

Except for the partnership, all business forms are designed to provide limited liability to both members of the organization and external investors. Business organizations originated with agency law, which permits an agent to act on behalf of a principal, in exchange for the principal assuming equal liability for the wrongful acts committed by the agent. For this reason, all partners in a typical general partnership may be held liable for the wrongs committed by one partner.

Those forms that provide limited liability are able to do so because the state provides a mechanism by which businesses that follow certain guidelines will be able to escape the full liability imposed under agency law. The state provides these forms because it has an interest in the strength of the companies that provide jobs and services therein, but also has an interest in monitoring and regulating their behavior. It has been suggested that the application of the nexus of contracts theory to corporations is undercut by the establishment of the limited liability company ("LLC") as a business form more explicitly formed from a nexus of contracts.

Business organizations can inhabit a wide range of sizes, with problems arising from the decentralization and disconnect within very large organizations.

== Business organizations as an area of study ==
Law schools typically offer either a single upper level course on business organizations, or offer several courses covering different aspects of this area of law. The area of study examines issues such as how each major form of business entity may be formed, operated, and dissolved; the degree to which limited liability protects investors; the fiduciary duties of stakeholders to one another, the extent to which a business can be held liable for the acts of an agent of the business; the relative advantages and disadvantages of different types of business organizations, and the structures established by governments to monitor the buying and selling of ownership interests in large corporations.

It has been asserted that "Business Organizations at its core is an extension of the law of contracts". The basic theory behind all business organizations is that, by combining certain functions within a single entity, a business (usually called a firm by economists) can operate more efficiently, and thereby realize a greater profit. Governments seek to facilitate investment in profitable operations by creating rules that protect investors in a business from being held personally liable for debts incurred by that business, either through mismanagement, or because of wrongful acts. It is also noted, however, that business organizations as a field relies on constitutional law as an underpinning, and implicates matters of criminal law and tort law.

== See also ==
- Sole Proprietorship
- Corporation Sole
- Limited-Liability Company
- Limited-Liability Limited Partnership
- Limited-Liability Partnership
- Limited Partnership
- Non-Profit Corporation
- Profit Corporation
