= Richard Fagan (polo) =

British businessman (born 1971)

Personal information
- Full name: Richard Joseph Fagan
- National team: Ireland
- Born: September 1971 (age 54)

Sport
- Country: Ireland
- Sport: Polo
- Team: Silex; Opel-Royal Salute; Badrutt's Palace Hotel; El Trebol
- Updated on 23 July 2016

Richard Joseph Fagan (born September 1971) is a businessman who created the Kijani Commodity Fund in 2011, later embroiled in a $16bn Ponzi scheme probe. Richard Fagan was fined £62m by Gibraltar’s Supreme Court for his role in defrauding investors through the Kijani Commodity and Ratio funds.

Fagan is the former captain of the Irish international polo team and also plays for Silex, Opel-Royal Salute, Badrutt's Palace Hotel and El Trebol, among others.

== Early life ==
Fagan was born in September 1971. He headed a family automotive broker and motor repair chain . In February 2006, he was a member of Los Griffos and won the Royal County of Berkshire Polo Club Arena Gold Cup. Fagan also won the Junior County Cup in 2006 with the Autodex polo team. He moved to Gibraltar in 2007 to work in the territory's investing industry.

== Business career ==
In 2011, Fagan started the Kijani Commodity Fund, which pitched investments to small commodity producers. The fund — originally domiciled in Mauritius — managed more than $130 million in assets. In 2014, the Mauritius Financial Services Commission began investigating Belvedere Management Group, belonging to David Cosgrove, and suspended two of Belvedere's local fund vehicles, one of which housed Fagan's Kijani fund, over investors' concerns. The Kijani Fund was seized by Cayman Island regulators in June 2015. Fagan was alleged to have siphoned off £56.2m from Kijani Resources and £5.8m from Ratio into companies he and his associates controlled. Furthermore, the funds’ assets were found to be hugely overvalued; the liquidators were only able to recover £1m from the £136m in investments that had been reported.

The judge ordered Fagan to pay £56.2m to Kijani Resources and £5.8m to Ratio with an additional 8% annual interest in February.

Source https://investment-international.com/News/gibraltar-judge-fines-irish-polo-team-captain-62m-for-investment-fraud/

== Polo career ==
By 2010, Fagan had won several international tournaments, including the XXXIX International Polo Tournament with Silex. In June 2014, Silex won the XV edition of the Andrés Parladé tournament against Powder Byrne/Blueye in overtime.

As captain of the Irish international polo team, Fagan won the silver medal in the 2014 European Polo Championships in France at the 2014 FEI World Equestrian Games. He accepted an Irish bog oak sculpture on behalf of the Irish team for winning the silver medal, which was presented by Horse Sport Ireland chairman Pat Wall and Federation of Irish Polo Clubs chairman James Kennedy. The team competed in the Land Rover International Polo Tournament and the XXXVI José Ignacio Domecq Memorial tournament at Santa María Polo Club.

In 2015, Fagan and Team Badrutt's Palace Hotel competed in the Snow Polo World Cup in St. Moritz, placing third in the event. As a member of Team Opel-Royal Salute, Fagan won the Silver Cup in Medium Goal at Land Rover International Polo Tournament. He was selected to represent Ireland in the Snow Polo World Cup 2016.
