= Yank Barry =

Canadian businessman and musician

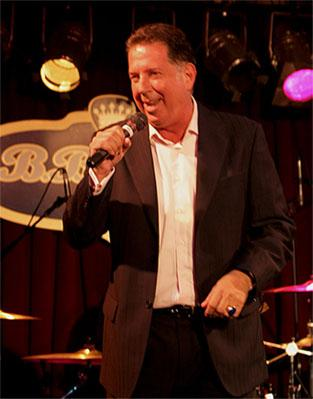
- Born: Gerald Barry Falovitch; 29 January 1948 (age 78); Montreal, Quebec, Canada
- Occupations: Founder and CEO of VitaPro, founder Global Village Champions Foundation, musician
- Spouse: Yvette Barry

Yank Barry (born 29 January 1948 as Gerald Barry Falovitch) is a Canadian businessman and musician. He is the founder and CEO of VitaPro Foods, a company that makes textured vegetable protein for use as a meat substitute and an apple pectin product called ProPectin, and is the founder of a US-based nonprofit organization called the Global Village Champions Foundation. He is a musician, songwriter, and music producer who had a stint as the lead singer of the garage rock band The Kingsmen in the 1960s.

In 1982, Barry was convicted of extortion and conspiracy and sentenced to a 6-year prison term on the charges. He was released after 10 months.

== Early life ==
Barry was born in Montreal, Canada, in 1948 to Arthur Falovitch and Ruth (née Reznick) Falovitch-Pickholtz. He grew up in the Jewish community of Montreal and had five siblings.

== Musical career ==
Barry was singer and bass player of a band called The Footprints during 1966–1968 using the stage name Gerald Barry. The band released three singles through Columbia and Capitol Records before breaking up.

During 1968–1969, while the main band lineup was on hiatus, Barry was the lead singer of the garage rock band The Kingsmen (a band most well known for their 1963 raucous hit rendition of Richard Berry's "Louie Louie").

In 1971, he recorded a rock opera entitled The Diary of Mr. Gray.

In 1972, Barry ran a record company.

Barry wrote the song "Christmas Time Again" that was performed by Engelbert Humperdinck on his 1977 album Christmas Tyme.

In 1979, he produced performances of the 1974 sexually explicit musical play Let My People Come, in Montreal.

== VitaPro ==
Barry is the CEO of VitaPro Foods Inc. It sells textured vegetable protein soy-based meat substitutes, primarily to prisons and other institutional feeding operations.

According to an investigative report by the Montreal Gazette from October 1998, Global Village Market (GVM) was a venture owned by Barry through which he sold VitaPro's meat substitute products. According to an article published by UPI, GVM's shares were listed on the World Investors' Stock Exchange, which was part of an investment fraud carried out by the Caribbean-based First International Bank of Grenada.

Barry developed VitaPro in 1989 or 1990. It was originally a South African venture. According to the VitaPro website, the company now operates from Belize and Bulgaria.

When asked about VitaPro earnings, Barry said: "My company is terribly private in a bunch of countries. I'm a resident of the Bahamas. I don't pay tax. I'm not American. Let's say we do over a billion dollars in business. How much I earn is up to me. I give it to kids. I made a deal with God that whatever I save in tax, I give to kids."

Barry also owns another venture called ProPectin, a Bulgarian company he purchased in 2009 that manufactures a pharmaceutical-grade apple pectin, which Barry credits with having cured his Type II diabetes.

== Global Village Champions Foundation ==
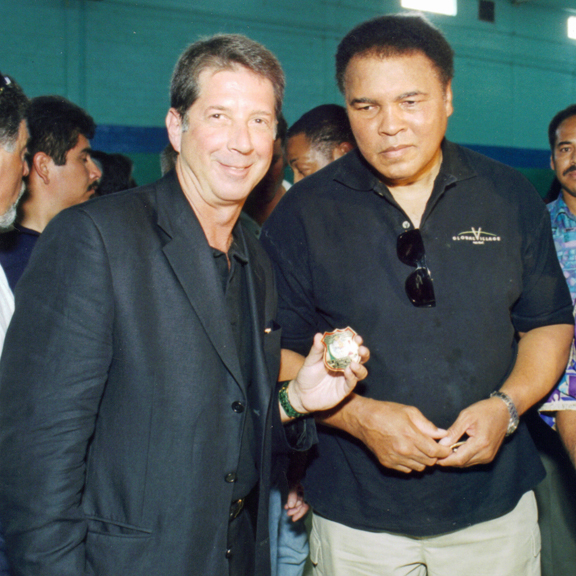
Yank Barry and Muhammad Ali at an award ceremony in 2012

Barry founded and heads the Global Village Champions Foundation. The foundation is a registered 501(c)(3) nonprofit in the United States, with self-reported net assets for 2016 of about US$7,000 and gross receipts of about US$3,000. The foundation was especially active in 2013, for which it reported net assets of about US$226,000 and gross receipts of about US$835,000. The foundation, which is funded by the profits from his VitaPro food business, said it had supplied 772 million meals to the needy worldwide by April 2012 and had spent more than US$1 million feeding and housing Syrian refugees in Bulgaria during 2012–2013. The foundation said it had supplied more than 1 billion meals to the needy by early 2015, based on its shipping documents and estimated portion sizes.

He has befriended several boxing champions who have supported his charitable work. Retired champion boxer Evander Holyfield became Global Village Champions's "Goodwill Ambassador" in 2013. Retired boxer Muhammad Ali was also his personal friend and worked with Barry on some of his humanitarian projects. After Barry's involvement in disaster relief in the Philippines, his foundation work also received support from Filipino boxer Manny Pacquiao.

In an interview with The Jerusalem Post via Skype in July 2014, Barry said that he has provided lodging in Bulgaria for 782 refugees from the Middle East, mostly from Syria, in two hotels he secured for US$3 million.

=== Degas bronzes ===
In 2010, Barry obtained a set of 74 bronzes for the Global Village Champions Foundation that were created from plaster casts attributed to Edgar Degas. The legitimacy of the plasters, which were reportedly discovered in a foundry (Fonderie Valsuani) outside of Paris, has been questioned by experts, and some have intentionally omitted them in their published description of Degas's body of work. Barry said he paid between US$7 million and US$20 million for the bronzes, although a dispute later broke out in which the seller said he had only actually received a payment US$400,000 and that further payments had not been delivered. (The dispute was later settled under undisclosed terms.) Conditioned on the presumption that the bronzes were fully authenticated and made from Degas's own plasters, the bronzes were estimated as being worth US$37 million by a New York dealer in an appraisal Barry obtained in 2011 which the appraiser said was intended for Barry's private use only. In 2010, Barry initially offered 50 of the sculptures as prizes in a raffle to raise money for the foundation, but later withdrew the plan to hold the raffle and shut down the web sites on which it was hosted. Barry said the decision to cancel the raffle was in part based on seeing publications that questioned the legitimacy of the bronzes and that he had returned the money that had been raised in the raffle offering up to that point.

== Court cases ==
In 1982, Barry was convicted of extortion from and conspiracy against John Royden McConnell, the man who financed the record company that he was running, and Barry served 10 months of a 6-year prison term on the charges.

In a 1982 civil case, a separate court ruled that Barry had extorted money from McConnell, requiring a financial award of C$285,000. In 1987 he declared bankruptcy, voiding the award. Barry said in an October 2013 Larry King interview that he had been a cocaine-addicted, twenty-something rocker at the time and credited the extortion conviction for changing his personal life.

In 1998, Barry was indicted on corruption charges related to a VitaPro contract worth US$34 million with the Texas prisons. In 1999, the Texas Supreme Court ruled the VitaPro contract with the Texas prisons was invalid. After a trial in 2001, he was initially declared guilty, but the verdict was thrown out by a US district court judge and a new trial was ordered in 2007. He was then acquitted in 2008 after a bench retrial. Barry said the charges were politically motivated.

In 2014, Barry filed a defamation lawsuit against four named Wikipedia editors and other anonymous editors ("Does 1–50") who he said had defamed him in articles on Wikipedia. He then withdrew the suit after about a month.

== Personal life ==
Barry is married to Yvette Barry, formerly an appraiser at an art gallery in Sarasota, Florida. He is a resident of the Bahamas, and a part-time resident of the Sarasota area. He was previously married to Daveda M. Kert, with whom he had a daughter, Lelanea Anne Barry, who died suddenly in 2004 at the age of 35.
