= Ross Roberts (sport shooter) =

Bermudian sport shooter

Ross Roberts is a Bermudian 50m prone rifle shooter. He won a bronze medal at the 2010 CAC Games in Puerto Rico. Roberts represented Bermuda at the 2010 Commonwealth Games in Delhi, India. This was the fourth time he represented Bermuda at a Commonwealth Games. Despite all the problems facing the 2010 Games, Roberts was determined to compete. He told the Bermuda Sun newspaper: "All the shooters are scheduled to go. We’ve been paying attention to what’s been going on but if you go back and history and look at the Olympic Games in Beijing, that was happening there as well". "We’re thinking by the time the Games start everything will fall in place so we’re all keeping pretty positive about it".
