= London Boat Show =

1955–2018 event in England

Coordinates: 51°30′27″N 0°1′47″E

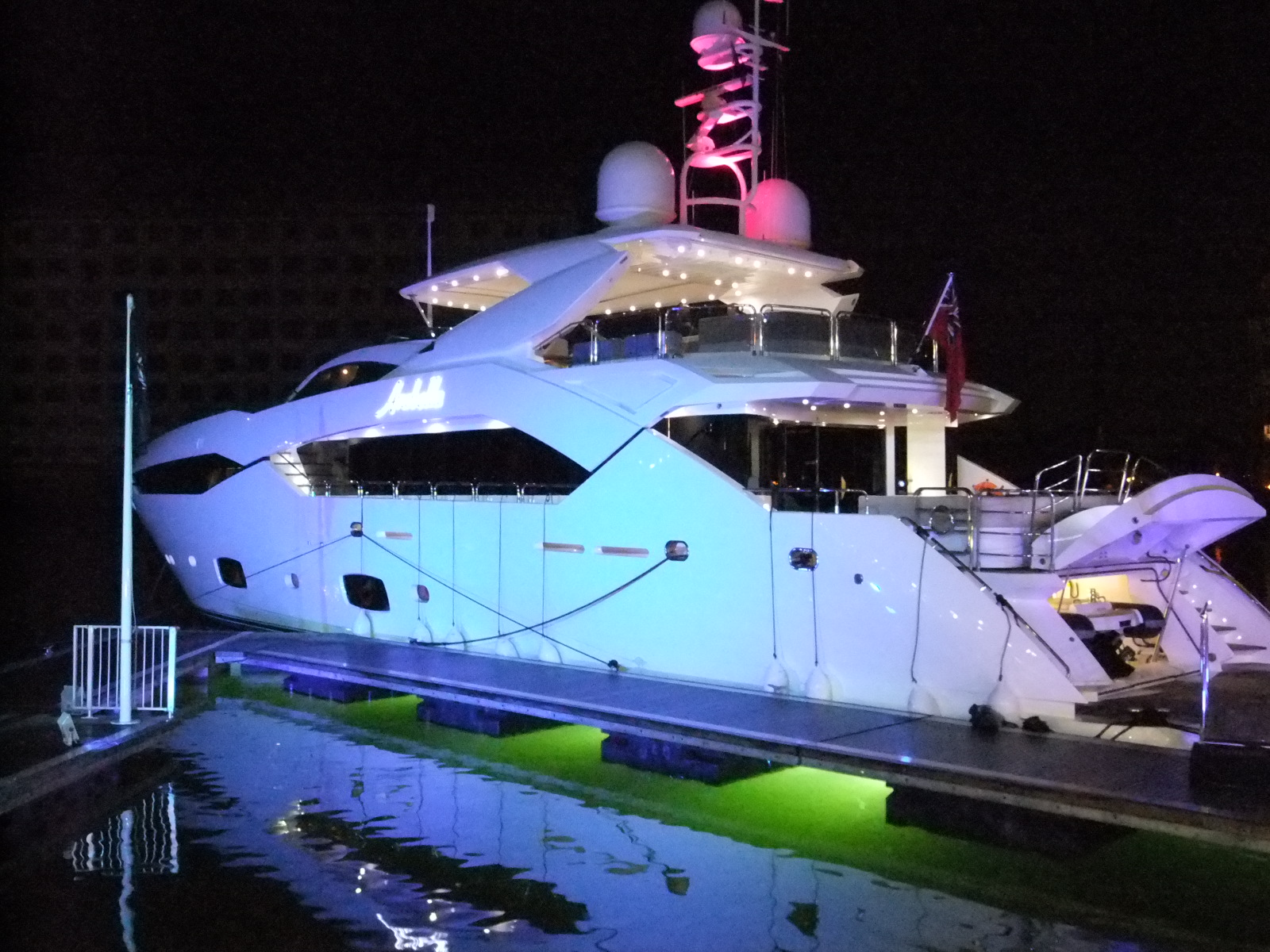
A boat at the 2012 show

The London Boat Show was an event held in London from 1955 to 2018, organised by British Marine. First held at Olympia, it was later moved to the Earls Court Exhibition Centre, and finally the ExCeL Exhibition Centre. The show's cancellation was announced in May 2018, with organisers citing the show as commercially unviable for the industry in its current format.

== History ==
The London Boat Show was founded in 1954 by Sir Max Aitken. The first shows were held at Olympia, before moving to the Earls Court Exhibition Centre in 1957. A popular feature of the show during its time at Earls Court was the use of the venue's pool area to host floating boats for visitors' inspection. It had expanded for some years into Chelsea Harbour before being moved to ExCeL in 2004. The inclusion of smaller craft such as dinghies, kayaks, canoes and stand-up paddleboards, as well as popular watersports such as wakeboarding, led to the inclusion of the Watersports Action Pool, where visitors could watch the craft indoors.

The show was usually ten days long, but in 2018 was reduced to five days.

In 2023, British Marine organised a "showcase event" called London Luxury Afloat, a five-day event at St Katharine Docks with 13 exhibitors.

== Sponsorship ==
In November 2014 it was announced that CWM FX had become the title sponsor for the London Boat Show. Since 2015 the show would be known as the CWM FX London Boat Show. CWM FX was closed in March 2015 after allegedly operating a Ponzi scheme.

== Attendances in final years ==
Year	Attendance	Source	Notes
2002	154,211	ABC audited	
2003	145,845	ABC audited	Last year at Earl's Court
2004	213,801	ABC audited	First year at ExCeL
2005	154,041	ABC audited	
2006	140,000	(unaudited)	
2007	130,000	National Boat Shows press release, 14 January 2007 (unaudited)	
2008	127,251	ABC audited	
2009	112,000	National Boat Shows press release, 18 January 2009 (unaudited)	
2010	102,655	National Boat Shows press release, 17 January 2010 (unaudited)	
2011	109,778	National Boat Shows press release, 17 January 2011 (unaudited)	
2012	102,841	National Boat Shows press release, 16 January 2012 (unaudited)	
2013	93,327	National Boat Shows figures	
2014	88,593	National Boat Shows figures	
2015	92,288	National Boat Shows figures	
2016	90,328	National Boat Shows figures	
2018	52,000	National Boat Shows figures	

== See also ==
- UK Waterways
