= David Dawson Cosgrove =

Irish businessman

- Born: David Dawson Cosgrove; April 1960 (age 66)
- Occupation: Businessman
- Known for: Belvedere Management group

David Dawson Cosgrove (born April 1960) is an Irish businessman whose Belvedere Management group claimed to have $16 billion of assets under administration. In 2016 he was barred from serving as an officer of any company regulated by the Mauritius Financial Services Commission (FSC) for a period of 5 years and the funds he managed were liquidated.

== Belvedere Management ==
Cosgrove was the founder of the Belvedere Management group which claimed to have $16 billion of assets under administration. The group reportedly ran125 hedge funds and has numerous subsidiaries active in fund administration, life insurance, stock broking, and investment management.

== Other company appointments ==
According to the listing document produced when Fulhold Pharma plc applied to have its shares admitted to the GXG Market in Denmark, as of 1 July 2014 Cosgrove was a director of over 70 companies located in Mauritius, Guernsey, Switzerland, Jersey, Seychelles, British Virgin Islands, Gibraltar, the Cayman Islands and the United Kingdom.

== Residence ==
Cosgrove worked from Mauritius where he managed the business of Belvedere, but also had a home in South Africa where he also lived and where much of the firm's business was done.

== See also ==
- Cobus Kellermann
- Kenneth Maillard
- Richard Fagan (polo)
