= Kijani Commodity Fund =

- Type: SPC
- Headquarters: Cayman Islands

The Kijani Commodity Fund is the largest cell within Brighton SPC, a Cayman Islands based fund. The fund had positive returns for investors in 49 of the 51 months it was trading, which was attributed to strategies such as commodity trading arbitrage. It was seized by Cayman authorities for an inability to verify its assets in June 2015.

== History ==
Kijani mean green in Swahili and was described as "the commodity equivalent of fair trade coffee" in 2011. The fund marketed to individual investors in Asia and the Middle East, investing in gold, oil and timber. Early on, it received $5 million in seed capital from billionaire Nadhmi Auchi, which was used for trading gold in Ghana.

In 2014, it was re-domiciled to the Cayman Islands to attract UK investors. The Cayman Islands Monetary Authority (CIMA) placed Brighton SPC in controllership following a forensic examination by PricewaterhouseCoopers. The audit found that the fund's only asset was a commercial loan to its primary company, Kijani Resources. The Kijani Commodity Fund had voluntarily suspended its trading activities since March 2015.

In June 2015, Kijani had more than $130 million in managed assets which were seized by Cayman authorities. In October 2015, CIMA announced that Brighton SPC had been placed in liquidation by PricewaterhouseCoopers.
