= Warren Brown (sailor) =

Bermudian sailor and businessman (1929–2014)

Warren Brown (1929 – 25 December 2014) was a Bermudian sailor and businessman. He took part in the Newport-Bermuda Race 20 times in 11 different boats, including four of his own. He was also a co-founder of the Island Press, which produced the now defunct Bermuda Sun newspaper.

== Personal life ==
Brown, at three months old, was among those who survived a shipwreck on 18 December 1929, when the RMS Fort Victoria was rammed by the SS Algonquin while anchored in dense fog. All aboard the Fort Victoria were rescued before she sank.
