= Cobus Kellermann =

South African executive (born 1977)

- Born: Jacobus "Cobus" Everhardus Kellermann c. 1977
- Education: Stellenbosch University
- Occupation: Chartered Financial Analyst

Jacobus "Cobus" Everhardus Kellermann (born c. 1977) is a South African Chartered Financial Analyst (CFA).

== Education ==
Kellermann was educated at Linden Hoerskool (matriculated 1994) and Stellenbosch University, from which he graduated in 1997 with a Bachelor of Commerce degree with a major in Mathematical Statistics.

== Career ==
Kellermann joined Investec Asset Management in 1998, where he was the unit trust portfolio manager of the Investec Value Fund. In 2001 he joined Ankh Analytic as chief executive officer. In 2004 he joined Optimal Fund Management as head of technical research. In 2009 Kellermann established Clarus Capital which runs seven unit trusts to the value of over R1.35 billion.

Kellerman also owns 50% of RDL Management in Mauritius, the investment management arm of Belvedere Management Limited. The other 50% is owned by David Cosgrove. RDL has $500m funds under management. According to filings with the Mauritius Financial Services Commission, Cosgrove is the director of the firm and Kellermann is the fund manager.

== Family and personal life ==
Kellermann has an enthusiasm for classic cars and reportedly owns a number of Ferraris.

== See also ==
- David Dawson Cosgrove
- Kenneth Maillard
