= Leverate =

Financial software

- Industry: Software as a Service
- Founded: 2008
- Founders: Ran Strauss, Doron Cohen, Itai Damti, Doron Somech
- Headquarters: Bnei Brak, Israel
- Key people: Ran Strauss, CEO; Doron Cohen, Chairman of the Board
- Products: LXSuite, LXFeed, LXRisk, LXCRM, Sirix, LXLite
- Website: www.leverate.com

Leverate is a software as a service provider for foreign exchange brokers. It provides both electronic trading platforms and back-office software to manage a company's operations through its various subsidiaries. It has offices in Cyprus, Hong Kong, Israel, Ukraine, China, Poland, Bulgaria and Germany.

== History ==
Leverate was founded in 2008 by Doron Cohen, Itai Damti, and Doron Somech, who had worked together on the project since 2006. The original idea was to create a trading algorithm for the purpose of buying and selling that was completely automated. It took two years to build the platform and the company was launched officially in 2008. Leverate received its first angel investment in 2008 from Jacques Beer, owner and chief executive officer of Tempo Beverages Ltd. The company saw a limit to the use of the algorithm and instead turned it into a price feed for brokers that helped reduce losses incurred by latency.

Leverate discontinued the use of its algorithm in 2008 and began to market products to brokers. One of the features of the algorithm was a product feed that was described as "fast" and "accurate." The company began using the feed to help brokers who had a lack of knowledge of market conditions. The feed became Leverate's initial product offering, referred to as LXFeed. Leverate moved from algorithm trading into the SaaS market with the product launch, leading to the development of additional products that include risk management tools and mobile trading platforms.

Leverate expanded its operations in 2011 by adding 20 employees to its staff of 50. The company was able to do so after selling a 25% stake to Saxo Bank for $12.5 million (USD). It also expanded its presence by opening a financial services branch in Hong Kong in 2012 and an office in Ukraine in 2013. Leverate entered into an agreement with Saxo Bank in 2014 to buy back that company's 25% stake in the company. In November 2017, Leverate launched Cyprus-based regulatory consulting and services operation Regyoul8, The Financial Certification Services, The Edu8, and the new generation trading platforms.

== Products ==
Leverate's first product was its LXFeed which launched in 2008. It released a risk management system in 2009. The same year, it began to bundle its products and release them under the name LXSuite while also allowing companies to purchase stand alone products. In 2010, it launched a platform called LXAPI which allowed users the ability to customize platforms. It also released LXCRM as a customer management tool for brokers. Digital currencies such as Bitcoin and Litecoin were added to its LXFeed in 2014.

Leverate ventured into the social trading marketing by launching Sirix Social Community and The New Generation Activ8. The community allows members to view and copy other trader's portfolios, creating transparency in currency pairs, as well as integrating with MetaTrader 4.

== See also ==
- Currency pair
- Exchange rate
- Market basket
