= Series LLC =

Type of a limited liability company

A series limited liability company, commonly known as a series LLC, protected cell company, segregated account company, or segregated portfolio company, and sometimes abbreviated as SLLC, is a form of a limited liability company that provides liability protection across multiple "series" each of which is theoretically protected from liabilities arising from the other series. In overall structure, the series LLC has been described as a master LLC that has separate divisions, which is similar to an S corporation with Q-subs.

The utility of a Series LLC may be explained by a comparison to the alternative. Many form an LLC in order to protect personal assets from a legal claim relating to their real estate investment or business liabilities. Additional liability protection may be gained by properly forming and maintaining a separate LLC to hold each property or business entity. By forming a separate LLC to own and hold each legally titled separate property or business entity, theoretically only the assets owned by a specific LLC would be subject to claims or lawsuits arising against that LLC. However, there are costs and administrative burdens associated with properly forming, qualifying and maintaining each separate LLC. Another option may be to form multiple series or "cells" if permitted under applicable laws. Although each cell of a Series LLC can own distinct assets, incur separate liabilities, and have different managers and members, a Series LLC may be able to pay a single set of annual state fees and may be able to file one income tax return each year. In addition to the administrative streamlining, the key value is that liability incurred by one unit does not cross over and jeopardize assets titled in or allocated to other subsidiary units of the same Series LLC.

In several jurisdictions, the procedure for adding and deleting series is uncomplicated. Additional series can be formed or dissolved without any public filing by simply amending the Series' "limited liability company agreement" (equivalent to an operating agreement for other LLCs). Under Delaware law, any particular series may be dissolved by 2/3 approval of the ownership interests, or a simple majority if provided for in the operating agreement. Some jurisdictions, notably Illinois, do have a mechanism for public publication of series. Additionally Illinois states that each series is a separate entity, whereas Delaware is silent on whether each series is a separate entity. Most states with the series LLC have followed the Delaware model, rather than the model in Illinois which requires each series to be designated with the Secretary of State.

== History ==
The concept of the series LLC was first introduced to help the mutual fund industry avoid filing multiple SEC filings for different classes of funds. Instead the idea was to use one entity for all funds so that the SEC filing would be under one umbrella, but still permit the individual funds' activities to be conducted separately. The concept is similar to that of the segregated portfolio company or protected cell company, concepts which existed prior to the invention of the series LLC in the United States. Segregated portfolio companies or protected cell companies exist in countries such as the Bahamas, Belize, Bermuda, the British Virgin Islands, the Cayman Islands, Guernsey, and Mauritius.

This method of liability segregation was first called the "Delaware Series LLC" because the first state to enact this legislation was Delaware (in 1996). Wisconsin passed a stripped-down version of the series LLC legislation in 2001. As of April 2005, Iowa and Oklahoma already had passed similar acts. Later in 2005, Illinois and Nevada followed. Tennessee and Utah passed legislation effective in 2006. Texas enacted non-entity series LLC legislation in 2009. Montana enacted Series LLC legislation in 2011, since becoming a popular organizational structure for captive insurance companies. Indiana adopted its Series LLC act in 2016.

== Comparison to corporation, and contrasts between states ==
=== What formalities are required to form the cells? ===
Illinois has restricted the rights given to the members of a series LLC to create new series because Illinois requires public filing. This has removed some of the cost savings of a series LLC. Illinois law specifically states that a series of an LLC "shall be treated as a separate entity to the extent set forth in the articles of organization," and then also provides that each series may "in its own name, contract, hold title to assets, grant security interests, sue and be sued and otherwise conduct business and exercise the powers of a limited liability company…"

Delaware further provides that to achieve the liability segregation that the series afford (the "internal shield"), the LLC must keep a separate set of records for each series, and to have a series enabling statement in its Certificate of Formation.

=== Are the cells persons with capacity to form contracts? Are the cells corporate-veiled and bankruptcy-remote from each other? ===
Until recently, Delaware did not clearly state that each series could sue, enter into contracts, etc. on its own, without the entire company being named in the lawsuit. Delaware clarified its legislation that a series can now enter into contracts, hold title to assets, grant liens and security interests and sue or be sued. In several other respects, series are not treated by Delaware as separate entities. For example, series are not separately registered and they cannot merge or consolidate with other entities, convert into other entity types or domesticate to another jurisdiction. In the early years of Delaware Series LLC, the Secretary of State would only provide a certificate of good standing of the top-level LLC, with an indication that it is a series LLC (as opposed to a traditional LLC). More recently, if the series are separately registered, Delaware will provide a separate Certificate of Good Standing for a series.

In 2015, Texas amended Section 1.201(b)(27) of the Texas Business & Commerce Code to clarify that a series of a Texas series LLC falls within the definition of a legal "person." This clarification is important because the definition of "person" is also incorporated in the Texas Uniform Commerce Code's definition of "debtor." This incorporation means that if an individual series of a Texas series LLC owns assets secured by a debt, then the individual series can be named on the UCC-1 financing statement that is required to perfect a lender's security interest. Before this update to the Business & Commerce Code, lenders often listed the series LLC instead of the individual series on UCC-1 financing statements, which exposed the series LLC to the debts of the individual series.

Wyoming's LLC statute specifically states that "[a] series ... shall have the power and capacity to, in its own name, contract, hold title to assets including real, personal and intangible property, grant liens and security interests and sue and be sued." Wyo. Stat. 17-21-211(e). In every respect, the Wyoming statutes treat an LLC series as a separate person from any other series and from the master entity. See generally id. at 17-21-211.

Other states that have enacted series legislation do not treat series as separate entities and do not allow series to enter into contracts or sue or be sued.

=== Full faith and credit by other states that do not have series LLC laws ===
There is uncertainty as to whether the liability shield between LLC series is fully effective in states that do not have series LLC laws. In the 2013 case of Alphonse v. Arch Bay Holdings, LLC, 548 F.App'x 979 (5th Cir. 2013), the United States Court of Appeals for the Fifth Circuit interpreted the application of the Louisiana Unfair Trade Practices Act to alleged violations by a Delaware series LLC. The court held that Louisiana law (which does not recognize the series LLC concept) would apply to determine whether a particular series of an LLC or the entire LLC would be the proper party to the litigation.

== Tax treatment ==
The series LLC is becoming more widely used as a liability segregation technique as its tax treatment becomes clearer and its use spreads. To date, the inter-jurisdictional efficacy of portfolio segregation has not been widely tested and the lack of precedent in federal bankruptcy court in particular is a significant source of uncertainty. At the same time, tax treatment is becoming clearer. On January 18, 2008, the Internal Revenue Service issued Private Letter Ruling 200803004, which ruled that the Federal tax classification (i.e., disregarded entity or partnership or taxable association) is determined for each series independently. So, for example, if there is only one owner of series A, then series A can be a disregarded entity (assuming it does not elect to be taxed as an association). And if series B has two owners, then it will be treated as a partnership. The proposed Treasury Regulations § 301.7701-1(a)(5) published in September 2010 should have become effective in 2012, though it did not. The regulations are expected to provide that each series will be treated, for tax purposes, as a separate entity regardless of whether the series is considered a legally distinct entity under local law. This clarity has been welcomed by the legal and tax community. California has taken the position that it will only tax income from those series conducting business in California but that each such series will owe the annual franchise fee.

Although the structure of LLCs vary in important ways, commentators have advanced opinions on how to minimize the chances of one series being held liable for liabilities of the entity as a whole or of another series. They have not been tested in court:

- A separate bank account should be maintained for each series.
- All contracts, deeds, notes, etc. should be signed in the name of the series. Again, use something like "Abracadabra LLC, Blackacre Series only".
- Any loans between series should be properly documented.
- Any transactions between series should be conducted in an arms'-length manner at fair market prices using appraisals.
- Have each series file a fictitious business name statement in each county where it owns property. Each series should have its own name and the filing should emphasize the ownership of that series, for example, "Abracadabra LLC, Blackacre Series only". This is to put creditors on notice.
- Keep the assets and operations of each series separate from the other series. Each asset should be owned solely by one series. In other words, two or more series should not be co-owners of the same property.
- Make sure each series is adequately capitalized.

== States and territories where a Series LLC can be formed ==
state	statute	year	initial fee for top-level LLC	naming req’ts for cell	formation of cells	inter-cell	annual fee	annual report for top-level LLC	annual report for cells	other
Alabama			200		no		100			
Arkansas			45		note 2		150 + 150 per Series	yes	yes	note 8
California		California does not permit series LLCs. However, California requires that each cell of a foreign series LLC that does business in California must pay the annual franchise fee.								
Delaware		1996	90			note 6	300		no	
D.Columbia			99	note 1	note 2		300/2 yrs			
Florida		2026								
Illinois		2005	150	note 1	note 2		75		yes	
Indiana										
Iowa			50	note 1	no		45		no	
Kansas			150	note 1	note 2		50			
Minnesota			155			note 5				
Missouri		2013	50	note 1	note 4		0	no	no	
Montana		2011	70		note 2		20			
Nevada		2005	425		no		350			
No. Dakota			135			note 5	50			
Ohio		2022	99						no	
Oklahoma			100		no		25		no	
Puerto Rico										
So. Dakota			150				50			
Tennessee		2006	300		no		300		no	
Texas		2009	300		note 3		0	yes	note 3	
Utah		2006	70	note 1	no		20		no	
Virginia			100				50			
Wisconsin		2001	130			note 5	25			
Wyoming			100				60			
Bahamas						note 7				
Belize										
Bermuda										
Cayman Is.										
Guernsey						note 7				
Marshall Islands										Same statutes as Delaware
Mauritius										

Note 0. Arkansas, Virginia, Nebraska, and Iowa have passed the Uniform Protected Series Act

Note 1. These states have rules for naming the cells. A typical rule requires that (a) each cell must include the name of the top-level series LLC in the cell's name, and (b) the names for each cell must be clearly distinguishable from each other.

Note 2. In Arkansas, the District Columbia, Illinois, Kansas, and Montana, each cell must be formed by a separate operating agreement and/or Articles of Organization or similar paperwork filed with the Secretary of State (as opposed to allowing creation of cells in the LLC's operating agreement).

Note 3. Texas requires a Certificate of Assumed Name for each cell, and that certificate must be renewed every 10 years.

Note 4. In Missouri, Articles of Organization must contain information on every Protected Series, and must be amended if a series is added or removed.

Note 5. In Minnesota, No. Dakota, and Wisconsin, the cells are not bankruptcy-remote (that is, liabilities of one cell may become liabilities of others), and cells cannot individually contract, only the top-level LLC.

Note 6. In Delaware, a cell can enter into contracts, hold title to assets, grant liens and security interests and sue or be sued.

Note 7. In the Bahamas, Cayman Islands, and Guernsey, the cells are unambiguously bankruptcy remote from each other. This makes these preferred jurisdictions for insurance companies.

Note 8. In Arkansas, you must have a protected series before filing the main LLC's Articles of Formation with the Secretary of State.
