= First International Bank of Grenada =

Offshore bank involved in a Ponzi scheme

The First International Bank of Grenada (FIBG) was an offshore bank that operated between 1996 and 2000, duping thousands of people in a Ponzi scheme. Four people were indicted, the result of a collaborative effort between the FBI and the Internal Revenue Service, estimating a monetary loss from investors at over $170 million.

The scheme was first reported by David Marchant, the publisher of OffshoreAlert, a Miami-based newsletter. The bank was put in liquidation with liabilities of $473 million.
