= Limited liability limited partnership =

Business entity in U.S. commercial law

The limited liability limited partnership (LLLP) is a relatively new modification of the limited partnership. The LLLP form of business entity is recognized under United States commercial law. An LLLP is a limited partnership, and it consists of one or more general partners who are liable for the obligations of the entity, as well as or more protected-liability limited partners. Typically, general partners manage the LLLP, while the limited partners' interest is purely financial. Thus, the most common use of limited partnership is for purposes of investment.

== LLLP versus LP ==
In a traditional limited partnership, the general partners are jointly and severally liable for their debts and obligations. Limited partners are not liable for those debts and obligations beyond the number of their capital contributions.

Not all states presently allow business entities to form as LLLPs. Most states that recognize LLLPs require that an entity’ identify itself as an LLLP in its name, but that requirement is not universal. LLLPs are most common in the real estate business, although other businesses can also use the form, for example, CNN. Questions remain about whether the limited liability provided to general partners by the LLLP election will be effective in states that do not have an LLLP statute.

== States with LLLP enabling statutes ==
The following states have statutes that enable LLLPs:

- Alabama
- Alaska
- Arizona
- Arkansas
- Colorado
- Delaware
- District of Columbia
- Florida
- Georgia
- Hawaii
- Idaho
- Indiana
- Iowa
- Kentucky
- Maryland
- Minnesota
- Missouri
- Montana
- Nevada
- New Mexico
- North Carolina
- North Dakota
- Ohio
- Oklahoma
- Pennsylvania
- South Dakota
- Tennessee
- Texas
- Utah
- Virginia
- Washington
- Wisconsin
- Wyoming
- US Virgin Islands

Though California does not have a state statute allowing formation of an LLLP, it does recognize LLLPs formed under the laws of another state. While registering an LLLP formed in another state in California will trigger the same annual franchise tax applicable to entities formed California. The statute governing whether an LLLP must register is less inclusive than the statute for out-of-state LLCs.

Illinois, though not having an enabling statute, does allow formation of an LLLP under RULPA (Revised Uniform Limited Partnership Act).
