= Belvedere Management =

Financial services group

- Industry: Financial services
- Headquarters: Mauritius
- Key people: David Dawson Cosgrove Kenneth Maillard
- Website: www.belvederemgt.com

Belvedere Management is a financial services group based in Mauritius that claims to have $16 billion of assets under administration. In March 2015, Offshore Alert described the group as a Ponzi scheme and it is currently under investigation by regulators in South Africa, Mauritius and Guernsey. The allegations remain unproven.

== Activities ==
Belvedere is reported to run 125 hedge funds and has interests in fund administration, life insurance, stock broking, and investment management. It operates from Mauritius, Guernsey, the Cayman Islands and South Africa and claims to have $16 billion of assets under administration. The group is managed by Irish businessman David Cosgrove, Mauritian accountant Kenneth Maillard, and South African fund manager Cobus Kellermann.

== Fund suspensions ==
In October 2014, The Mauritius Financial Services Commission placed two funds run by Belvedere as protected cell companies, Lancelot Global PCC and The Four Elements PCC, in administration meaning that they are prohibited from accepting new business. Among the companies affected by the suspension of the Four Elements fund has been Apollo Multi-Asset Management in the United Kingdom who have written to their investors to advise them that they are unable to withdraw money from its Mauritius domiciled £5.81 million Four Elements Apollo fund. The administration is being managed by PricewaterhouseCoopers. On 1 June 2015, the Cayman Islands Monetary Authority announced that Belvedere entity Brighton SPC had been placed in Controllership following a forensic examination of the fund by accountants. The controllers now have complete authority over the fund in order to protect the interests of investors and creditors. In March 2015, the publication Offshore Alert accused the group of being a Ponzi scheme that is currently under investigation by regulators in South Africa, Mauritius and Guernsey.

== Components ==
Some of the entities in the group are:

=== Guernsey ===
- Lancelot Management Limited – A Guernsey regulated collective investment scheme manager.

=== Jersey ===
- Belvedere Management and Investment Limited

=== Mauritius ===
- Belvedere Fund Manager Limited – Fund manager to the Theseus Property Fund Limited.
- Belvedere Life Limited, PCC – A life insurance company.
- Belvedere Management Limited (licensed by the Mauritius Financial Services Commission)
- E-portfolio Solutions Limited - Electronic trading of mutual funds and shares.
- RDL Management Limited – A collective investment manager.
- Teleraka Investments Limited – An investment advisor to cells of the Universal Mutual Fund, a Guernsey regulated ICC.
- Theseus Property Fund Limited – A property fund which invests in Mauritius real estate.

== See also ==
- CWM FX
- David Marchant
