= Segregated portfolio company =

Company with multiple isolated portfolios

A segregated portfolio company (or SPC), sometimes referred to as a protected cell company, is a company which segregates the assets and liabilities of different classes (or sometimes series) of shares from each other and from the general assets of the SPC.

Segregated portfolio assets comprise assets representing share capital, retained earnings, capital reserves, share premiums and all other assets attributable to or held within the segregated portfolio.

== Separation of liability ==
Only the assets of each segregated portfolio are available to meet liabilities to creditors in respect of that segregated portfolio; where there are liabilities arising from a matter attributable to a particular segregated portfolio, the creditor may only have recourse to the assets attributable to that segregated portfolio.

Under the laws of some jurisdictions, where the assets of a segregated portfolio are inadequate to meet that portfolio's obligations then a creditor may have recourse to the general assets of the SPC, but not those assets which belong to a different segregated portfolio. An SPC is technically a single legal entity and the segregated portfolios within the SPC will not be separate legal entities which are separate from the SPC, although for bankruptcy purposes they are treated as such.

The Principality of Liechtenstein regulates the Protected Cell Companies in Art. 243 ff of the Personal and Company Law (PGR). PCC can be entered in the commercial register since January 1, 2015. The relevant preparatory work by the government of the Principality of Liechtenstein has been ongoing since 2013.

== Formation ==
SPCs originated in Guernsey and Delaware, but a number of other jurisdictions followed, and they can now be formed in Bermuda, the British Virgin Islands, the Cayman Islands, Anguilla, Ireland (the Republic of), Mauritius, Jersey, the Isle of Man, Malta, Bahrain, Gibraltar and Samoa.

== Usage ==
SPCs have several potential functions. They are mostly commonly used in the formation of collective investment schemes as umbrella funds and for the formation of captive insurance companies (typically a variation of a "rent-a-captive"). They are also sometimes used as asset holding vehicles (characteristically where each portfolio holds a single ship or aircraft) and they can also potentially be used in capital markets debt issuances.

Although growing in popularity, SPCs still remain a niche risk transfer tool. Because of the relative ease of forming multiple offshore companies in most jurisdictions where SPCs are available for incorporation, and because it is uncertain how the concept of segregated portfolios (and thus no consequential cross-contamination of liabilities) would be treated in an onshore bankruptcy or by credit ratings agencies, many promoters still instead opt for the formation of multiple companies under a single holding company.

== Alternatives ==
=== "Segregated Cell Companies" and "Companies with a Separate Account Structure" ===
In some jurisdictions, separation of liability is achieved by different statutory mechanisms. For example, Barbados allows the formation of both "Segregated Cell Companies" and "Companies with a Separate Account Structure". The former are SPCs by another name. The latter separate liabilities by allowing a company to allocate assets and attendant liabilities to any number of separate accounts. In Nevis, similar provisions in the Insurance Ordinance 2004 allow insurers to establish "statutory funds" to which they may allocate the risks of any insured who agrees to such allocation. The assets of a statutory fund are only available to meet liabilities in respect of business allocated to that fund.

=== United States series LLCs ===
Many U.S. states have enacted a conceptually-similar corporate law mechanism, the series LLC.

=== South Africa cell captive companies ===
Unlike most developed financial markets, there is no legal structure similar to segregated portfolio companies in South Africa. Rather, these companies, known locally as cell captive companies, are companies with different classes of shares, each class being issued to a different cell owner. Separation of assets and liabilities, known as ring-fencing, is achieved through contractual agreements, and given the lack of statutory structure there exists a theoretical risk that creditors may claim dues from cells other than those that are their debtors according to the arrangement agreed to. However, such a precedent has as yet not been set.

In South Africa, there are seven long-term insurers and eleven short-term insurers registered to conduct cell captive insurance business, who manage more than 130 short-term and 50 long-term third-party cell captive insurance arrangements.

== See also ==
- Offshore Financial Centres
- Special-purpose entity
- Special-purpose acquisition company
- Special purpose private equity fund
- Series LLC
