= Bermuda Sun =

1964–2014 Bermudian newspaper

- Type: Twice-weekly newspaper
- Format: Tabloid
- Owner: Island Press Limited (a subsidiary of MediaHouse Limited)
- Publisher: Randy French
- Editor-in-chief: Tony McWilliam
- Founded: 1964
- Ceased publication: 30 July 2014
- Language: English
- Headquarters: 19 Elliott Street; Hamilton HM10; Bermuda
- OCLC number: 751681580
- Website: bermudasun.bm

The Bermuda Sun was a Bermudian newspaper, published on Wednesdays and Fridays.

Covering a wide range of topics including news, sports, business and lifestyle, it also published the Government of Bermuda's legal notices.

== Foundation ==
The newspaper began in 1964, edited by Martin Dier.

== Ownership and administration ==
It was published by Island Press Limited, whose parent company, MediaHouse Limited, reported a $2.9 million profit for the first half of 2009.

As of August 2012, the newspaper's publisher was Randy French and its editor-in-chief was Tony McWilliam.

== Awards ==
The newspaper won two Best of Bermuda Awards in the June 2012 issue of The Bermudian magazine. Its online module, The Bermuda Sun Online, was named Best Source of Local News and Information while Larry Burchall was named Best Critical Columnist.

== Sister organisation ==
The newspaper is a sister company to bermuda.com, a website dedicated to Bermuda tourism.

== Closure ==
The last ever issue was published on Wednesday 30 July 2014.

== See also ==
- Lists of newspapers
- Warren Brown
