= Financial Services Commission (Mauritius) =

Financial regulatory authority of Mauritius

Financial Services Commission (FSC)
- Commission des Services Financiers de Maurice

Regulatory authority overview
- Formed: 2001
- Jurisdiction: Government of Mauritius
- Headquarters: Ébène, Mauritius; 20°14′39.8976″S 57°29′25.9476″E
- Minister responsible: Navin Ramgoolam, Minister of Finance and Economic Development
- Regulatory authority executives: Rama Krishna Sithanen, Chairperson (since 9 December 2024); Désiré Vencatachellum, Chief Executive (effective 16 September 2025)
- Parent department: Ministry of Finance and Economic Development
- Website: www.fscmauritius.org

The Financial Services Commission (FSC) is the statutory regulatory authority in Mauritius for non-banking financial services. It was established in 2001 and is responsible for licensing, regulating and supervising entities operating in insurance, securities, private pensions and global business. The Commission functions under the Ministry of Finance and Economic Development and derives its authority principally from the Financial Services Act 2007, the Securities Act 2005, the Insurance Act 2005 and the Private Pension Schemes Act 2012.

== History ==
The FSC was created in 2001 with the objective of consolidating regulation of non-banking financial activities, which had previously been overseen by different bodies. Its establishment was intended to enhance investor protection, improve market oversight and align domestic supervision with international standards. The Financial Services Act 2007 expanded its role, formally establishing the Commission as the integrated regulator for global business and private pension schemes.

== Functions ==
The Commission is mandated to oversee the conduct of non-banking financial institutions in Mauritius. Its responsibilities include licensing regulated entities, monitoring compliance with domestic laws, and supervising operations through both on-site and off-site methods. It also works to ensure conformity with international standards issued by organisations such as the International Organization of Securities Commissions (IOSCO) and the International Association of Insurance Supervisors (IAIS). In addition, the FSC is tasked with supporting the development of the financial sector while maintaining safeguards against financial crime, including the implementation of anti-money laundering and counter-terrorist financing measures.

== Governance ==
The FSC is governed by a Board of Commissioners appointed by the Minister of Finance. The current Chairperson is Dr. Rama Krishna Sithanen, a former Deputy Prime Minister of Mauritius, who assumed office on 9 December 2024. The incoming Chief Executive is Désiré Vencatachellum, whose appointment takes effect on 16 September 2025.

== Recent developments ==
In October 2021 Mauritius was removed from the Financial Action Task Force (FATF) "grey list", and in 2022 it was also delisted from the United Kingdom and European Union lists of high-risk jurisdictions. These actions followed reforms to the country’s anti-money laundering and counter-terrorist financing framework. In 2024 the FSC introduced a streamlined licensing process with reduced processing times, intended to improve regulatory efficiency. According to official figures, the global business sector supervised by the FSC accounts for more than eight percent of Mauritius’ gross domestic product and employs over 5,600 people.

The CEO of the Commission resigned in May 2026.

== See also ==
- Bank of Mauritius
- Financial Crimes Commission (Mauritius)
- List of financial supervisory authorities by country
