= GXG Markets =

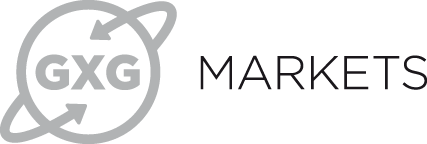
- Type: Stock exchange
- Location: Horsens, Denmark
- Founded: 1998
- Owner: GXG Global Exchange Group (Sweden)
- Key people: Carl Johan Hogbom chairman Peter Almberg managing director Mikael Rosenberg executive director
- Currency: DKK, GBP and EURO

GXG Markets was a European Regulated Market which operated a securities market focusing on SME companies by operating a three-tier market structure with an OTC (Over-the-counter) segment called GXG First Quote (an information and trading platform for professional investors), a multilateral trading facility (MTF) called GXG Main Quote and a Regulated market called GXG Official List.

GXG Markets utilised its parent company's, GXG Global Exchange Group's proprietary electronic trading platform, GXG Tellus. The GXG Markets had two kinds of members: Corporate Advisors and Broker Dealers. A Corporate Advisor was responsible for listing firms on the Market, while an official (regulated) Broker Dealer could set up trading accounts, trade and clear shares or debt of the exchange on the MTF and Regulated Markets.

== Market Identifier Codes ==
GXGR (GXG Official List - "Regulated Market"), GXGM (GXG Main Quote - "MTF"), GXGF (GXG Fist Quote - "OTC").

According to ISO10383 and ESMA (European Securities and Markets Authority).

== Background ==
GXG Markets was originally established in 1998 as Dansk Autoriseret Markedsplads.

The company was the first to be approved by the Danish Financial Supervisory Authority to operate an authorized marketplace.

In August 2010, the company was acquired by Swedish GXG Global Exchange Group. They retained Group Chairman Carl-Johan Hogbom and CEO Peter Almberg, who continued to the date of closure but had no executive control.

They pushed for new listings to be made and GXG listings grew from 12 (Sept. 2012) to 100+ by mid 2014. Initial growth came from companies moving from other markets where regulations were being tightened. Many companies listed were from outside the EU. In 2013, the UK's HMRC added both the GXG Official List and GXG Main Quote markets to the list of designated recognised stock exchanges.

Its business model was based on providing a listing venue which had a very low cost when considering the total fee stack (ie, the total of exchange fees and adviser fees). As the market was designed for professional investors, it could achieve this by reducing the reporting burden on companies planning to list on the market when compared to similar EU markets. As only professional investors were allowed to trade on the market, they would be able to make their own decisions on the companies without needing additional reporting like, for example, expensive independent reports on working capital to justify the Directors' assertions of having sufficient working capital.

As such, the GXG was of interest to:

- very small companies who could not afford the costs of more well known markets
- international companies with no effective local stock exchange
- early stage companies that did not have the history or could not provide the information required on other markets
- or speculative companies and their brokers and advisers.

It is this last group that were most problematic for the GXG.

Much of the promotion of its listing services was done from its London office which operated under the EU's financial services passporting arrangements which were in force during the UK's membership of the EU. The GXG market was particularly attractive in London where the total listing cost on GXG might be less than a third when compared to established UK markets like AIM or what was then known as Plus Market. While trading volumes on AIM or PLUS were potentially higher, there was little difference between GXG and the very bottom end of the UK markets. As such, the GXG offering represented a potentially serious competitive threat to UK junior markets and the revenue of the adviser network of NOMADS/sponsors, lawyers and accountants. This created tension between the Danish and UK regulatory authorities.

The advantages that GXG's different approach to operating a market might offer when compared to the traditional London markets and the UK regulator's views was little understood and poorly articulated by GXG. This was further acerbated by weaknesses in the GXG's internal compliance screening of listing candidates, the low quality of some of the advisers they approved as sponsoring agents, and the rapid growth of the market. This resulted in the quality of companies listed by the GXG market being heavily criticised without regard to it being a market only for professionals.

Over time, the GXG strengthened its listing requirements following the pattern of "lawyering up" seen in the UK markets under pressure from UK regulatory authorities via the Danish Financial Supervisory Authority. These steps included forcing all already listed companies to undertake further due diligence reporting or face delisting.

While poor management and weak execution appear to be largely to blame, the exact role of the UK's Financial Conduct Authority (FCA) in the demise of the GXG has not been fully explained. A Freedom of Information request for information held by the UK's FCA was turned down. The role that the Danish regulator played in its demise has also not been publicly examined and in particularly its ability to regulate a market offering services to small companies from non-EU jurisdictions and the role of fringe international financial advisers.

== Leadership ==
GXG Markets was chaired by Carl Johan Hogbom, formerly the CEO of the OMX Stockholm Exchange, now known under the name Nasdaq Nordic. The CEO was Peter Almberg.

== GXG Official Broker Dealers ==
- GXG Brokers

== GXG Corporate Advisors ==
- Corporate Advisors

== Closure, Allegations of Poor Management & Claims for Losses ==
In May 2015, the Danish Financial Services Authority raised serious questions about the operations of the GXG. They stated "that GXG repeatedly and grossly neglected and disregarded its own rules and internal guidelines. As a consequence of this neglect, GXG exposed itself and the market to the exact same risk elements that the very same rules are intended to manage and mitigate. Against this backdrop, Finanstilsynet assesses that GXG has failed to operate its regulated market and multilateral trading facilities in an adequate and appropriate manner. Such operation is irreconcilable with continuation of the company's licences and therefore, Finanstilsynet assesses that the company's licenses should be withdrawn."

As a result, despite attempts to find a new regulator, on 29 June 2015 GXG announced that it would cease all new listings. On 6 July, it announced that it had decided to close with last trading on the market on August 18.

On 22 July 2015, the Channel Islands Securities Exchange (CISE) Chairman, Jon Moulton, announced that it had made an offer for the market. Shortly after, it announced on 31 July that it would not proceed following due diligence.

GXG Markets officially closed on August 18, 2015 at 1 p.m. 17.00 CET.

At least one group has filed legal claims against GXG and its Chairman, Carl Johan Hogbom alleging billions of Euros in fraud were facilitated by GXG and direct losses of €50 million.

- Lawsuit for €50 million
- Finanstilsynet (the Danish FSA)Statement on GXG

== See also ==
- London Stock Exchange
- Alternative Investment Market
- Markets in Financial Instruments Directive
