= Resulting trusts in English law =

Trusts created where property is not properly disposed of

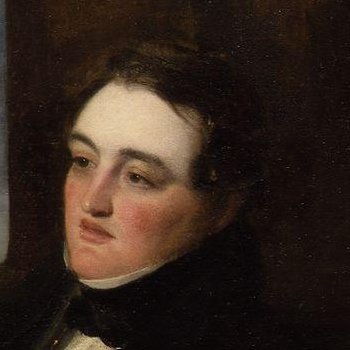
James LJ, who set the standard rule for the rebuttal of presumptions in Fowkes v Pascoe.

Resulting trusts in English law are trusts created where property is not properly disposed of. It comes from the Latin resultare, meaning to spring back, and was defined by Megarry VC as "essentially a property concept; any property that a man does not effectually dispose of remains his own". These trusts come in two forms: automatic resulting trusts, and presumed resulting trusts. Automatic resulting trusts arise from a "gap" in the equitable title of property. The equitable maxim "equity abhors a vacuum" is followed: it is against principle for a piece of property to have no owner. As such, the courts assign the property to somebody in a resulting trust to avoid this becoming an issue. They occur in one of four situations: where there is no declaration of trust, where an express trust fails, where there is surplus property, or upon the dissolution of an unincorporated association. Rules differ depending on the situation and the type of original trust under dispute; failed charitable trusts, for example, have the property reapplied in a different way from other forms of trust.

Where property passes between individuals, English law presumes that the relationship between them makes it an outright gift, and thus not subject to a resulting trust in the event of failure; this is the "presumption of advancement". A presumed resulting trust occurs where the transfer fails, and there is no reason to assume it was intended as an outright gift. With some relationships, such as property transfers between father and son and husband and wife, this presumption of advancement is applied by default, and requires strong evidence for it to be rebutted. Presumed resulting trusts do arise, however, in one of three situations: where it is a voluntary gift, where there is a contribution to purchase price, and where the presumption that it was an outright gift can be rebutted. Rules differ for transfers and gifts of personal property and land; while personal property is assumed by default to create a resulting trust, Section 60(3) of the Law of Property Act 1925 prevents the creation of automatic resulting trusts. It does not comment on presumed resulting trusts, and while later law has seemingly permitted such trusts, there is some disagreement.

== Definition ==
The name resulting trust comes from the Latin resultare, meaning to spring back. It was defined in Re Sick and Funeral Society of St John's Sunday School, Golcar, where Megarry VC stated that "A resulting trust is essentially a property concept; any property that a man does not effectually dispose of remains his own". A resulting trust could also be defined as an equitable reversion implied by the courts that may assist in the returning of trust property back to the settlor where there is doubt concerning his intention. In Re Vandervell's Trusts (No 2), he divided them into two categories; presumed resulting trusts, which are created by the presumed intention of the transferor of property, and automatic resulting trusts, which arise regardless of the transferor's intention whenever he has failed to dispose of the beneficial interest. Lord Browne-Wilkinson, in Westdeutsche Landesbank v Islington London Borough Council, disagreed with Megarry's classification. While he agreed there were two categories, he felt the dividing line was not based on intention, and the classes were "where A makes a voluntary payment to B or pays (wholly or in part) for the purchase of property which is vested either in B alone or in the joint names of A and B" and "Where A transfers property to B on express trusts, but the trusts declared do not exhaust the whole beneficial interest", with both involving a presumption of intention. It is possible to argue that Quistclose trusts are also a category of resulting trusts, but their classification is the subject of much debate and remains ambiguous.

The theoretical justification for resulting trusts was discussed by the Privy Council, in Air Jamaica v Charlton, where Lord Millet said that "Like a constructive trust, a resulting trust arises by operation of law, though unlike a constructive trust it gives effect to intention. But it arises whether or not the transferor intended to retain a beneficial interest - he almost always does not - since it responds to the absence of any intention on his part to pass a beneficial interest to the recipient". Resulting trusts were intended to fill in the gap left by a veiled transfer, obeying the equitable maxim that "equity will not suffer a wrong to be without a remedy". In Westdeutsche Landesbank, Browne-Wilkinson stated that resulting trusts "are traditionally regarded as examples of trusts giving effect to the common intention of the parties. A resulting trust is not imposed by law against the intentions of the trustee (as in a constructive trust) but gives effect to his presumed intention". Alastair Hudson, Professor of Equity and Law at Queen Mary, University of London, argues that Browne-Wilkinson's theory is flawed, primarily because if the trust can not be enforced against the trustee's wishes, it is a form of constructive trust. Much of the case law is instead based on Megarry's classification.

Resulting trusts work on a principle of "common intention". This is the idea that a resulting trust is a mix of the settlor's intention, and the trustee's knowledge that he is not intended to be the beneficiary. In Carreras Rothmans Ltd v Freeman Mathews Treasure Ltd, Gibson J expressed the principle as:

The principle in all these cases is that the equity fastens on the conscience of the person who receives from another property transferred for a specific purpose only and not, therefore, for the recipient's own purposes, so that such a person will not be permitted to treat the property as his own or to use it for other than the stated purpose...if the common intention is that property is transferred for a specific purpose and not so as to become the property of the transferee, the transferee cannot keep the property if for any reason that purpose cannot be fulfilled.

== Types ==
=== Automatic resulting trusts ===
Automatic resulting trusts arise from a "gap" in the equitable title of property. The equitable maxim "equity abhors a vacuum" is followed; it is against principle for a piece of property to have no owner. As such, the courts assign the property to somebody in a resulting trust to avoid this becoming an issue. Automatic resulting trusts occur where an express trust fails. This includes where there is no valid declaration of trust, where there is surplus property, or upon the dissolution of an unincorporated association. Whatever the reason, when a trust fails the property must be passed to someone. This is an application of the equitable maxim that "equity abhors a vacuum".

No declaration of trust is the most straightforward form of resulting trust, and is created when a trust is created, but the settlor does not give the form in which the property is to be held. For example, the settlor might give property to the beneficiary to hold for life, but fail to explain what is to happen to the property when the holder dies. When this occurs, the property is held on resulting trust for the settlor, as in Vandervell v IRC. This also occurs where a trust is formed over property which requires formality, but is improperly created (for example, a land transfer that does not adhere to the Law of Property Act 1925).

Upon the failure of a charitable trust, the gift may be held on resulting trust for the donor, as in Chichester Diocesan Fund v Simpson, or submitted to variation under the cy-près doctrine. As in Simpson v Simpson, if property is given to somebody who is incapable of acting, it will also be held on resulting trust for the donor.

A resulting trust will also be found where the purposes of a trust have been completed, but there is excess property left over; for example, a trust by a settlor to provide for his children's university education. Judges and academics disagree over what should happen to the property; possibilities are that it should be held for the donors, that it should be held for the beneficiaries (as the donors intended to make an irrevocable gift) or that it should be given to the Crown as bona vacantia. A fourth suggestion is that the trustees take the surplus, as in Re Foord. The general rule was set out in Re Trusts of the Abbot Fund, where it was decided that excess funds will be held on resulting trust for the settlor. There are exceptions to this rule; the general rule is put aside if the court can find intention to benefit specific individuals, as in Re Osoba.

Linked to this category is the problem of unincorporated associations. Unincorporated associations cannot hold rights (chattels or land) on their own account. When they dissolve, the question is then what to do with property that has been transferred to the association. The traditional view, as laid out in Re West Sussex Constabulary's Widows, Children and Benevolent (1930) Fund Trusts, is that the members of the association hold these rights on purpose trust. Where the money was raised from identified individuals, the property should be held on resulting trust for donors upon the failure of the purpose trust. Where it is impossible or impractical, the property should be passed to the Crown as bona vacantia. The more modern view developed from Walton J's judgment in Re Bucks Constabulary Benevolent Fund. This is that dissolving a society and distributing property to its members is a matter of contract, not trusts law. As such, the contract between the association's members should be the deciding factor in how the property is to be distributed, and there is no need to involve resulting trusts. If the contractual provisions identify how to distribute property, they will be followed; if not, the property will be distributed according to an implied term, usually in equal shares.

=== Presumed resulting trusts ===
Where property passes between individuals, English law presumes that the relationship between them makes it an outright gift, and thus not subject to a resulting trust in the event of failure; this is the "presumption of advancement". A presumed resulting trust is where the transfer fails, and there is no reason to assume it was intended as an outright gift. There are several types of relationship where it is automatically presumed to be a gift. Where a father transfers property to a child, it is presumed that the property was an outright gift, as in Bennet v Bennet. There is no similar recognition for a transfer from a mother, something recognised as a gift in Australia. A similar presumption exists where a transfer is made from a husband to a wife, as in Tinker v Tinker.

Presumed resulting trusts do arise, however, in one of three situations; where it is a voluntary gift, where there is a contribution to purchase price, and where the presumption that it was an outright gift can be rebutted. Where a gift is voluntary, the assumption for personal property is that it creates a resulting trust on failure, as in Re Vinogradoff. For real property, Section 60(3) of the Law of Property Act 1925 prevents the creation of automatic resulting trusts, but does not comment on presumed trusts. In Hodgson v Marks, it is generally agreed that a presumed resulting trust was created over a transfer of real property, although there is some dispute. Where a person contributed to the price of a piece of property, they are presumed to take an equivalent equitable interest in that property; this is the "clearest form of presumed resulting trust", and was recognised by both Browne-Wilkinson in Westdeutsche Landesbank and Megarry in Vandervell (No. 2). These principles originated with Eyre CB's judgment in Dyer v Dyer, where he said that:

The clearest result of all the cases, without a single exception, is that the trust of a legal estate, whether freehold, copyhold or leasehold; whether taken in the names of the purchasers and others jointly, or in the names of other without that of the purchaser; whether in one name or several; whether jointly or successive - results to the man who advances the purchase money.

Thus, where a person contributes to the purchase of the property, they will receive an equivalent equitable interest in any resulting trust that arises. For trusts over homes, a distinct set of rules have arisen that do not apply to other land, because of the additional concerns. For example, while contributing to the mortgage will create an equitable interest, as in Lloyds Bank v Rosset, contributing to domestic expenses will not, as in Burns v Burns. It must also be demonstrated that the contribution was not made for any purpose other than acquiring an equitable interest; in Sekhon v Alissa, for example, a mother transferred a house into her daughter's name to avoid capital gains tax. The court ruled that this created a resulting trust; because tax avoidance was the main objective, the mother could not possibly have intended it to be an outright gift.

The last situation where a presumed resulting trust is created is if the court can rebut the presumption of an outright gift. The general philosophy here was set out by James LJ in Fowkes v Pascoe, and is that the judge should base his decision on "[the] story as to how I came to have [the property], and judge that story with reference to the surrounding facts and circumstances". Where the property is money held in a joint bank account, the presumption is that it is a joint tenancy of that account. As such, when one dies the property is passed absolutely to the other, as in Marshall v Crutwell. This presumption can be rebutted in several situations. It will be rebutted when the account, while in the name of both the husband and wife, is used exclusively for the husband's personal use, as in Young v Sealey, or where the joint account exists solely so the husband can guarantee the wife's account, as in Anson v Anson. Tax avoidance (which is legal, as opposed to tax evasion) frequently involves transferring property to a family member to avoid tax. Where the family member refuses to transfer it back, the taxpayer can come to court and argue it was a resulting trust.

== Illegality ==
Traditionally, when a person sought to rebut presumptions but was required to rely on an illegal act to prove that a resulting trust was intended, the equitable maxim that "he who comes to equity must come with clean hands" was applied; the presumption would take effect, and no resulting trust would be created, as in Mucklestone v Brown. In addition, as in Gascoigne v Gascoigne, where the purpose of the transfer involves illegality, the courts will not uphold it as a resulting trust. This rule was subtly modified by the House of Lords decision in Tinsley v Milligan. Tinsley and Milligan had jointly purchased a house to run as a business, and both accepted that it had been bought to own jointly. Only Tinsley was registered as the owner, however, so that Milligan (with Tinsley's knowledge) could claim state benefits. The House of Lords decided that Milligan could claim an equitable interest, since it was the contribution to the purchase price (a lawful act) which she was relying on, not the associated fraud (an illegal act). Although the purpose of the initial registration had been illegal, the purpose of the purchase itself had not.

Since Tinsley, the courts have been more willing to examine the intention of the parties rather than relying on the strict maxim that "he who comes to equity must come with clean hands". The standard law on this was set out by Millett LJ in Tribe v Tribe:

(1) Title to property passes both at law and in equity even if the transfer is made for an illegal purpose. The fact that title has passed to the transferee does not preclude the transferor from bringing an action for restitution.
(2) The transferor's action will fail if it would be illegal for him to retain any interest in the property
(3) Subject to (2) the transferor can recover the property if he can do so without relying on the illegal purpose. This will normally be the case where the property was transferred without consideration in circumstances where the transferor can rely on an express declaration of trust or as a resulting trust in his favour.
(4) It will almost invariably be so where the illegal purpose has not been carried out. It may be otherwise where the illegal purpose has been carried out and the transferee can rely on the transferor's conduct as inconsistent with his retention of a beneficial interest.
(5) The transferor can lead evidence of the illegal purpose whenever it is necessary for him to do so provided that he has withdrawn from the transaction before the illegal purpose has been wholly or partly carried into effect. It will be necessary for him to do so (i) if he brings an action at law or (ii) if he brings proceedings in equity and needs to rebut the presumption of advancement.
(6) The only way in which a man can protect his property from his creditors is by divesting himself of all beneficial interest in it. Evidence that he transferred the property in order to protect it from his creditors, therefore, does nothing by itself to rebut the presumption of advancement; it reinforces it. To rebut the presumption it is necessary to show that he intended to retain a beneficial interest and conceal it from his creditors.
(7) The court should not conclude that this was his intention without compelling circumstantial evidence to this effect. The identity of the transferee and the circumstances in which the transfer was made would be highly relevant. It is unlikely that the court would reach such a conclusion where the transfer was made in the absence of an imminent and perceived threat from known creditors.

As seen in Tribe v Tribe, a common form of illegality is where the transferor is worried about bankruptcy or insolvency, and transfers the property to avoid having to pay his creditors. Section 423 of the Insolvency Act 1986 empowers to the courts to reverse any transfer which removes assets from creditors with the intention to avoid their claims. These creditors do not have to be creditors at the time of the transfer; it is enough that they be creditors after the transfer or sale, as in Midland Bank v Wyatt.

== Bibliography ==
- Edwards, Richard; Nigel Stockwell (2007). Trusts and Equity (8th ed.). Pearson Longman. ISBN 978-1-4058-4684-4.
- Gardner, Simon (1992). "New angles on unincorporated associations". Conveyancer and Property Lawyer.
- Green, Brian (1980). "The Dissolution of Unincorporated Non-profit Associations". Modern Law Review. 43.
- Hudson, Alastair (2009). Equity and Trusts (6th ed.). Routledge-Cavendish. ISBN 0-415-49771-X.
