= Re Vandervell Trustees Ltd (No 2) =

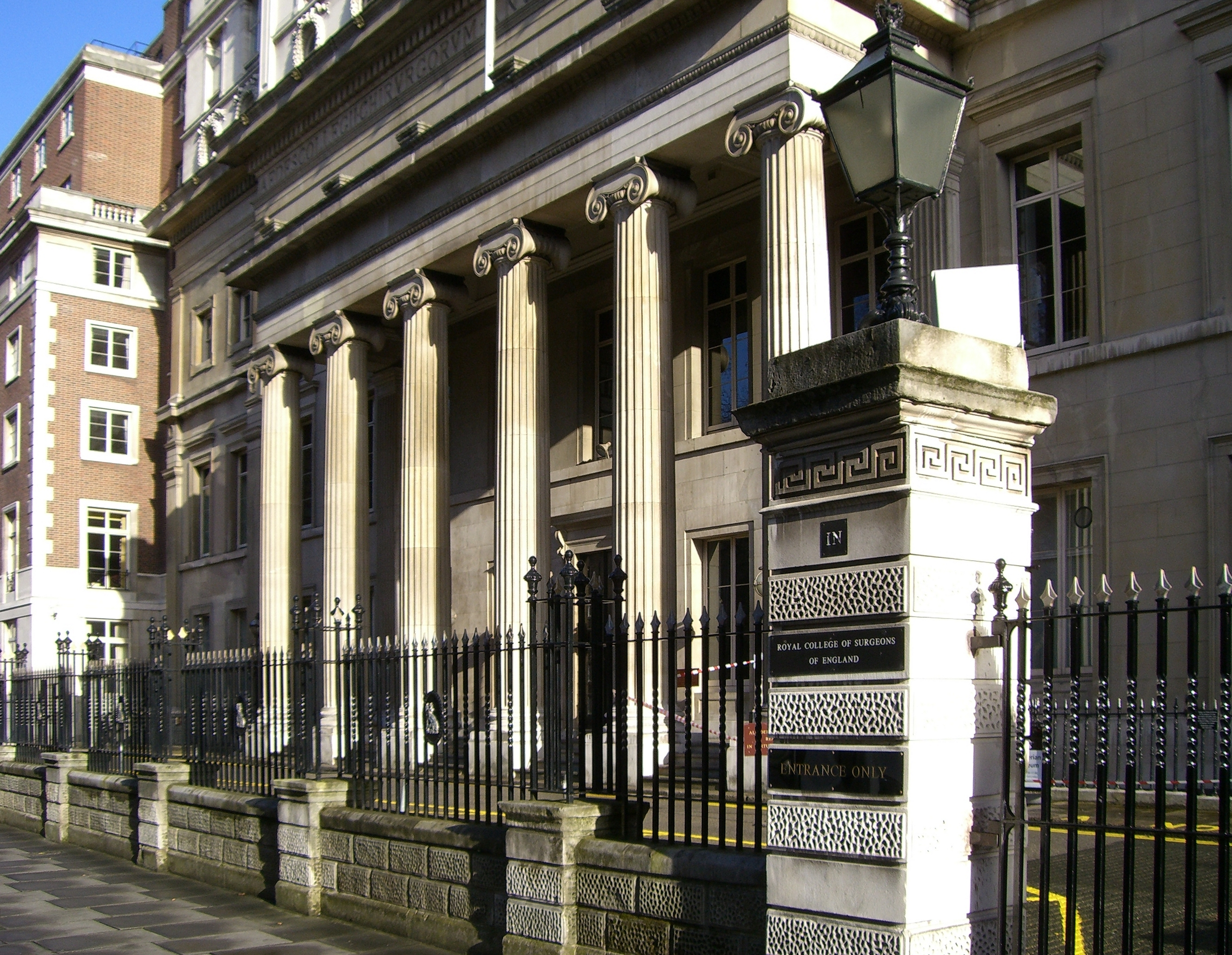
- Court: Court of Appeal
- Full case name: White v Vandervell Trustees Ltd (No 2)
- Decided: 3 July 1974
- Citations: [1974] EWCA Civ 7, [1974] Ch 269

Case history
- Prior action: [1973] 3 WLR 744, [1974] 1 All ER 47

Court membership
- Judges sitting: Lord Denning MR, Stephenson LJ and Lawton LJ

Keywords
- Resulting trusts

Re Vandervell Trustees Ltd (No 2) [1974] EWCA Civ 7 is a leading English trusts law case, concerning resulting trusts.

This was the third decision concerning Tony Vandervell's will. The first was Vandervell v Inland Revenue Commissioners, where the House of Lords was concerned with whether an oral instruction to transfer an equitable interest in shares complied with the writing requirement under Law of Property Act 1925 section 53(1)(c), and so whether receipt of dividends was subject to tax. The second was In re Vandervell's Trusts, which involved the Special Commissioner of the Inland Revenue's ability to amend tax assessments.

== Facts ==
Tony Vandervell, a wealthy racing car manufacturer, was attempting to make a donation to the Royal College of Surgeons to establish a chair in his name. Since large donations were taxed at the time, he granted the College a number of shares in his company, and paid dividends on those shares, which the College (being a charity), would receive tax-free. However, this scheme was defeated in the case Vandervell v Inland Revenue Commissioners.

Vandervell therefore had the shares repurchased by a trust company set up to manage his children's inheritance, through an option that had been granted during the setup of the original tax-avoidance scheme. As such, the trust company considered themselves as holding the purchased shares on trust for the children, and Vandervell proceeded to pay dividends on the shares with the intention of benefiting his children. However, the tax authority continued to view the shares as being Vandervell's personal property and charged him taxes on the dividends paid. So Vandervell signed a document explicitly transferring any remaining rights in the shares to the trust company.

Two years later Vandervell died, but the tax authority continued to seek payment of taxes on all dividends paid before he signed the document. Furthermore, on the same basis, Vandervell's own executors made a claim to recover the dividends themselves from the trust company.

== Judgment ==
=== High Court ===
Megarry J gave judgment, holding that there was liability to pay tax. He distinguished two kinds of resulting trusts as "presumed resulting trusts", where the courts presume the parties' intend to make a resulting trust, and "automatic resulting trusts", where assets are passed to a trustee on express trusts, but a surplus remains. In each case the assets return (or result back) to the transferor.

=== Court of Appeal ===
The Court of Appeal (overturning the judgment of Megarry J in the High Court) held that the option ceased to exist once it was exercised. Thus, there was no disposition, and no consequent liability to pay tax. It also held that the children were the equitable owners of the shares, and, as such, Vandervell had divested himself of equitable ownership of the shares.

Lord Denning MR gave his judgment as follows.

The late Mr Vandervell died on March 10, 1967. His affairs have twice been to the House of Lords. The first, Vandervell v Inland Revenue Commissioners [1967] 2 AC 291. The second, In re Vandervell's Trusts [1971] AC 912. The third is now on its way.

During his lifetime Mr Vandervell was a very successful engineer. He had his own private company, Vandervell Products Ltd. - the products company, as I will call it - in which he owned virtually all the shares. It was in his power to declare dividends as and when he pleased.

In 1949 he set up a trust for his children. He did it by forming Vandervell Trustees Ltd. - the trustee company, as I will call it. He put three of his friends and advisers in control of it. They were the sole shareholders and directors of the trustee company. Two were chartered accountants. The other was his solicitor. He transferred money and shares to the trustee company to be held in trust for the children. Such was the position at the opening of the first period.

The first period: 1958-1961

The first period covers the three years from October 1958 to October 1961. Mr. Vandervell decided to found a chair of pharmacology at the Royal College of Surgeons. He was to endow it by providing £150,000. But he did not do it by direct gift. In November 1958, he transferred to the Royal College of Surgeons 100,000 "A" shares in his products company. His intention was that his products company should declare dividends in favour of the Royal College of Surgeons which would amount in all to £150,000 or more. But, when that sum had been provided, he wanted to be able to regain the shares - so as to use the dividends for other good purposes. So, about the time of the transfer, on December 11, 1958, he got the Royal College of Surgeons to grant an option to his trustee company. By this option the Royal College of Surgeons agreed to transfer the 100,000 "A" shares to the trustee company for the sum of £5,000 at any time on request within the next five years. (This £5,000 was far less than the real value of the shares.) At the time when the option was granted, Mr. Vandervell did not state definitely the trusts on which the trustee company were to hold the option. He meant the trustee company to hold the option on trust - not beneficially for themselves - but on trust for someone or other. He did not specify the trusts with any kind of precision. But at a meeting with the chairman of the trustee company it was proposed - and Mr. Vandervell approved - that the option should be held either on trust for his children (as an addition to the children's settlement) or alternatively on trust for the employees of his products company (see the particulars declared by the executors). He had not made up his mind which of those should benefit. But one thing he was clear about. He thought that he himself had parted with all interest in the shares and in the option.

Afterwards, during the years from 1958 to 1961, he saw to it that his products company declared dividends on these 100,000 shares which were paid to the Royal College of Surgeons. They amounted to £266,000 gross (before tax), or £157,000 net (after tax). So the Royal College of Surgeons received ample funds to found the chair of pharmacology.

But there were other advantages hoped for. The Royal College of Surgeons thought that, being a charity, they could claim back the tax from the revenue. and Mr. Vandervell thought that, having parted with all interest in the shares, he was not subject to pay surtax on these dividends.

The revenue authorities, however, did not take that view. They claimed that Mr. Vandervell had not divested himself of all interest in the shares. They argued that he was the beneficial owner of the option and liable for surtax on the dividends. Faced with this demand, in October 1961, the trustee company, on the advice of counsel, and with the full approval of Mr. Vandervell, decided to exercise the option. They did it so as to avoid any question of surtax thereafter being payable by Mr, Vandervell. This ended the first period (when the option was in being) and started the second period (after the option was exercised).

The second period: 1961-1965

In October 1961 the trustee company exercised the option. They did it by using the money of the children's settlement. They paid £5,000 of the children's money to the Royal College of Surgeons. In return the Royal College of Surgeons, on October 27, 1961, transferred the 100,000 "A" shares to the trustee company. The intention of Mr. Vandervell and of the trustee company was that the trustee company should hold the shares (which had replaced the option) on trust for the children as an addition to the children's settlement. They made this clear to the revenue authorities in an important letter written by their solicitors on November 2, 1961, which I will read:

" G. A. Vandervell, Esq. - Surtax

"Further to our letter of September 7 last, we write to inform you that in accordance with the advice tendered by counsel to Vandervell Trustees Ltd., the latter have exercised the option granted to them by the Royal College of Surgeons of December 1, 1958, and procured a transfer to them of the shares referred to in the option, with funds held by them upon the trusts of the settlement created by Mr. G. A. Vandervell and dated December 30, 1949, and consequently such shares will henceforth be held by them upon the trusts of the settlement."

Mr. Vandervell believed that thenceforward the trustee company held the 100,000 "A" shares on trust for the children. He acted on that footing. He got his products company to declare dividends on them for the years 1962 to 1964 amounting to the large sum of £1,256,458 gross (before tax) and £769,580 10s. 9d. (after tax). These dividends were received by the trustee company and added to the funds of the children's settlement. They were invested by the trustee company for the benefit of the children exclusively.

But even now Mr. Vandervell had not shaken off the demands of the revenue authorities. They claimed that, even after the exercise of the option, Mr. Vandervell had not divested himself of his interest in the 100,000 "A" shares and that he was liable for surtax on the dividends paid to the children's settlement. Faced with this demand Mr. Vandervell, on the advice of counsel, took the final step. He executed a deed transferring everything to the trustee company on trust for the children. This ended the second period, and started the third.

The third period: 1965-1967

On January 19, 1965, Mr. Vandervell executed a deed by which he transferred to the trustee company all right, title or interest which he had on the option or the shares or in the dividends - expressly declaring that the trust company were to hold them on the trusts of the children's settlement. At last the revenue authorities accepted the position. They recognised that from January 19, 1965, Mr. Vandervell had no interest whatever in the shares of the dividends. They made no demands for surtax thenceforward.

On January 27, 1967, Mr. Vandervell made his will. It was in contemplation of a new marriage. In it he made no provision for his children. He said expressly that this was because he had already provided for them by the children's settlement. Six weeks later, on March 10, 1967, he died.

Summary of the claims

The root cause of all the litigation is the claim of the revenue authorities.

The first period

- 1958 - 1961: The revenue authorities claimed that Mr. Vandervell was the beneficial owner of the option and was liable for surtax on the dividends declared from 1958 to 1961. This came to £250,000. The claim of the revenue was upheld by the House of Lords: see Vandervell v Inland Revenue Commissioners [1967] 2 AC 291.

The second period

- 1961-1965: The revenue authorities claimed that Mr. Vandervell was the beneficial owner of the shares. They assessed him for surtax in respect of the dividends from October 11, 1961, to January 19, 1965, amounting to £628,229. The executors dispute the claim of the revenue. They appealed against the assessments. But the appeal was, by agreement, stood over pending the case now before us. The executors have brought this action against the trustee company. They seek a declaration that, during the second period, the dividends belonged to Mr. Vandervell himself, and they ask for an account of them. The revenue asked to be joined as parties to the action. This court did join them (see In re Vandervell's Trusts [1970] Ch 44); but the House of Lords reversed the decision (see [1971] AC 912 ). So this action has continued - without the presence of the Revenue, whose claim to £628,229 has caused all the trouble.

The third period

- 1965-1967: The Revenue agree that they have no claim against the estate for this period.

The law for the first period

The first period was considered by the House of Lords in Vandervell v Inland Revenue Commissioners [1967] 2 AC 291. They held, by a majority of three to two, that, during this period, the trustee company held the option as a trustee. The terms of the trust were stated in two ways. Lord Upjohn (with the agreement of Lord Pearce) said that the proper inference was that "the trustee company should hold as trustee upon such trusts as he [Mr. Vandervell] or the trust company should from time to time declare" (see pp. 309, 315, 317). Lord Wilberforce said "that the option was held by the trustee company on trusts" "not at the time determined, but to be decided on at a later date" (see pp. 328, 325).

The trouble about the trust so stated was that it was too uncertain. The trusts were not declared or defined with sufficient precision for the trustees to ascertain who the beneficiaries were. It is clear law that a trust (other than a charitable trust) must be for ascertainable beneficiaries: see In re Gulbenkian's Settlements [1970] AC 508, 523-524, per Lord Upjohn. Seeing that there were no ascertainable beneficiaries, there was a resulting trust for Mr. Vandervell. But if and when Mr. Vandervell should declare any defined trusts, the resulting trust would come to an end. As Lord Upjohn said [1967] 2 AC 291, 317: "... until these trusts should be declared, there was a resulting trust for [Mr. Vandervell]."

During the first period, however, Mr. Vandervell did not declare any defined trusts. The option was, therefore, held on a resulting trust for him. He had not divested himself absolutely of the shares. He was therefore, liable to pay surtax on the dividends.

The law for the second period

In October and November 1961, the trustee company exercised the option. They paid £5,000 out of the children's settlement. The Royal College of Surgeons transferred the legal estate in the 100,000 "A" shares to the trustee company. Thereupon the trustee company became the legal owner of the shares. This was a different kind of property altogether. Whereas previously the trustee company had only a chose in action of one kind - an option - it now had a chose in action of a different kind - the actual shares. This trust property was not held by the trustee company beneficially. It was held by them on trust. On this occasion a valid trust was created at the time of the transfer. It was manifested in clear and unmistakable fashion. It was precisely defined. The shares were to be held on the trusts of the children's settlement. The evidence of intention is indisputable: (i) The trustee company used the children's money - £5,000 - with which to acquire the shares. This would be a breach of trust unless they intended the shares to be an addition to the children's settlement. (ii) The trustee company wrote to the revenue authorities the letter of November 2, 1961, declaring expressly that the shares "will henceforth be held by them upon the trusts of the [children's] settlement." (iii) Thenceforward all the dividends received by the trustees were paid by them to the children's settlement and treated as part of the funds of the settlement. This was all done with the full assent of Mr. Vandervell. Such being the intention, clear and manifest, at the time when the shares were conveyed to the trustee company, it is sufficient to create a trust.

Mr. Balcombe for the executors admitted that the intention of Mr. Vandervell and the trustee company was that the shares should be held on trust for the children's settlement. But he said that this intention was of no avail. He said that during the first period, Mr Vandervell had an equitable interest in the property, namely, a resulting trust; that he never disposed of this equitable interest (because he never knew he had it): and that in any case it was the disposition of an equitable interest which, under section 53 of the Law of Property Act 1925, had to be in writing, signed by him or his agent, lawfully authorised by him in writing (and there was no such writing produced). He cited Grey v Inland Revenue Commissioners [1960] AC 1 and Oughtred v Inland Revenue Commissioners [1960] AC 206.

There is a complete fallacy in that argument. A resulting trust for the settlor is born and dies without any writing at all. It comes into existence whenever there is a gap in the beneficial ownership. It ceases to exist whenever that gap is filled by someone becoming beneficially entitled. As soon as the gap is filled by the creation or declaration of a valid trust, the resulting trust comes to an end. In this case, before the option was exercised, there was a gap in the beneficial ownership. So there was a resulting trust for Mr Vandervell. But, as soon as the option was exercised and the shares registered in the trustees' name, there was created a valid trust of the shares in favour of the children's settlement. Not being a trust of land, it could be created without any writing. A trust of personalty can be created without writing. Both Mr Vandervell and the trustee company had done everything which needed to be done to make the settlement of these shares binding on them. So there was a valid trust: see Milroy v Lord (1862) 4 De GF & J 264, 274, per Turner LJ.

The law as to the third period

The executors admit that from January 19, 1965, Mr Vandervell had no interest whatsoever in the shares. The deed of that date operated so as to transfer all his interest thenceforward to the trustee company to be held by them on trust for the children. I asked Mr Balcombe: What is the difference between the events of October and November 1961, and the event of January 19, 1965? He said that it lay in the writing. In 1965, Mr Vandervell disposed of his equitable interest in writing: whereas in 1961 there was no writing. There was only conduct or word of mouth. That was insufficient. And, therefore, his executors were not bound by it.

The answer to this argument is what I have said. Mr Vandervell did not dispose in 1961 of any equitable interest. All that happened was that his resulting trust came to an end - because there was created a new valid trust of the shares for the children's settlement.

Estoppel

Even if Mr Balcombe were right in saying that Mr Vandervell retained an equitable interest in the shares, after the exercise of the option, the question arises whether Mr. Vandervell can in the circumstances be heard to assert that claim against his children. Just see what happened. He himself arranged for the option to be exercised. He himself agreed to the shares being transferred to the trustee company. He himself procured his products company to declare dividends on the shares and to pay them to the trustee company for the benefit of the children. Thenceforward the trustee company invested the money and treated it as part of the children's settlement. If he himself had lived, and not died, he could not have claimed it back. He could not be heard to say that he did not intend the children's trust to have it. Even a court of equity would not allow him to do anything so inequitable and unjust. Now that he has died, his executors are in no better position. If authority were needed, it is to be found in Milroy v Lord, 4 De GF & J 264. In that case Thomas Medley assigned to Samuel Lord 50 shares in the Bank of Louisiana on trust for his niece: but the shares were not formally transferred into the name of Samuel Lord. The bank, however, paid the dividends to Samuel Lord. He paid them to the niece, and then, at Thomas Medley's suggestion, the niece used those dividends to buy shares in a fire insurance company - taking them in the name of Thomas Medley. After Thomas Medley's death, his executors claimed that the bank shares belonged to them as representing him, and also the fire insurance shares. The lords justices held that the executors were entitled to the bank shares, because "there is no equity in this court to perfect an imperfect gift": see p. 274. But the executors were not entitled to the fire insurance shares. Turner L.J., said at p. 277:

"the settlor [Mr. Medley] made a perfect gift to [his niece] of the dividends upon these shares, so far as they were handed over or treated by him as belonging to her, and these insurance shares were purchased with dividends which were so handed over or treated."

So here Mr Vandervell made a perfect gift to the trustee company of the dividends on the shares, so far as they were handed over or treated by him as belonging to the trustee company for the benefit of the children. Alternatively, there was an equitable estoppel. His conduct was such that it would be quite inequitable for him to be allowed to enforce his strict rights (under a resulting trust) having regard to the dealings which had taken place between the parties: see Hughes v Metropolitan Railway Co (1877) 2 App Cas 439, 448.

The pleadings

Mr Balcombe for the executors stressed that the points taken by Mr Mills were not covered by the pleadings. He said time and again: "This way of putting the case was not pleaded." "No such trust was pleaded." and so forth. The more he argued, the more technical he became. I began to think we were back in the bad old days before the Common Law Procedure Acts 1852 and 1854, when pleadings had to state the legal result; and a case could be lost by the omission of a single averment: see Bullen and Leake's Precedents of Pleadings, 3rd ed. (1868), p. 147. All that has been long swept away. It is sufficient for the pleader to state the material facts. He need not state the legal result. If, for convenience, he does so, he is not bound by, or limited to, what he has stated. He can present, in argument, any legal consequence of which the facts permit. The pleadings in this case contained all the material facts. It does appear that Mr Mills put the case before us differently from the way in which it was put before the judge: but this did not entail any difference in the facts, only a difference in stating the legal consequences. So it was quite open to him.

Conclusion

Mr Balcombe realised that the claim of the executors here had no merit whatsoever. He started off by reminding us that "hard cases make bad law." He repeated it time after time. He treated it as if it was an ultimate truth. But it is a maxim which is quite misleading. It should be deleted from our vocabulary. It comes to this: "Unjust decisions make good law": whereas they do nothing of the kind. Every unjust decision is a reproach to the law or to the judge who administers it. If the law should be in danger of doing injustice, then equity should be called in to remedy it. Equity was introduced to mitigate the rigour of the law. But in the present case it has been prayed in aid to do injustice on a large scale - to defeat the intentions of a dead man - to deprive his children of the benefits he provided for them - and to expose his estate to the payment of tax of over £600,000. I am glad to find that we can overcome this most unjust result. The dividends for the second period were properly paid to the trustee company for the benefit of the children's settlement. There is no equity in Mr Vandervell or his executors seeking to recover them. I would allow the appeal and dismiss the claim of the executors.

Stephenson LJ, with some reservation, concurred. Lawton LJ gave a concurring judgment.

== See also ==
- English trusts law
- Resulting trusts in English law
- Vandervell v IRC [1967] 2 AC 291
- Tinsley v Milligan [1994] 1 AC 340
- Tribe v Tribe [1996] Ch 107
- Westdeutsche Landesbank Girozentrale v Islington London Borough Council [1996] AC 669
- Air Jamaica Ltd v Charlton [1999] 1 WLR 1399
- Barclays Bank Ltd v Quistclose Investments Ltd [1970] AC 567
- Twinsectra Ltd v Yardley [2002] 2 AC 164
