= Vandervell v IRC =

1967 English trusts law case

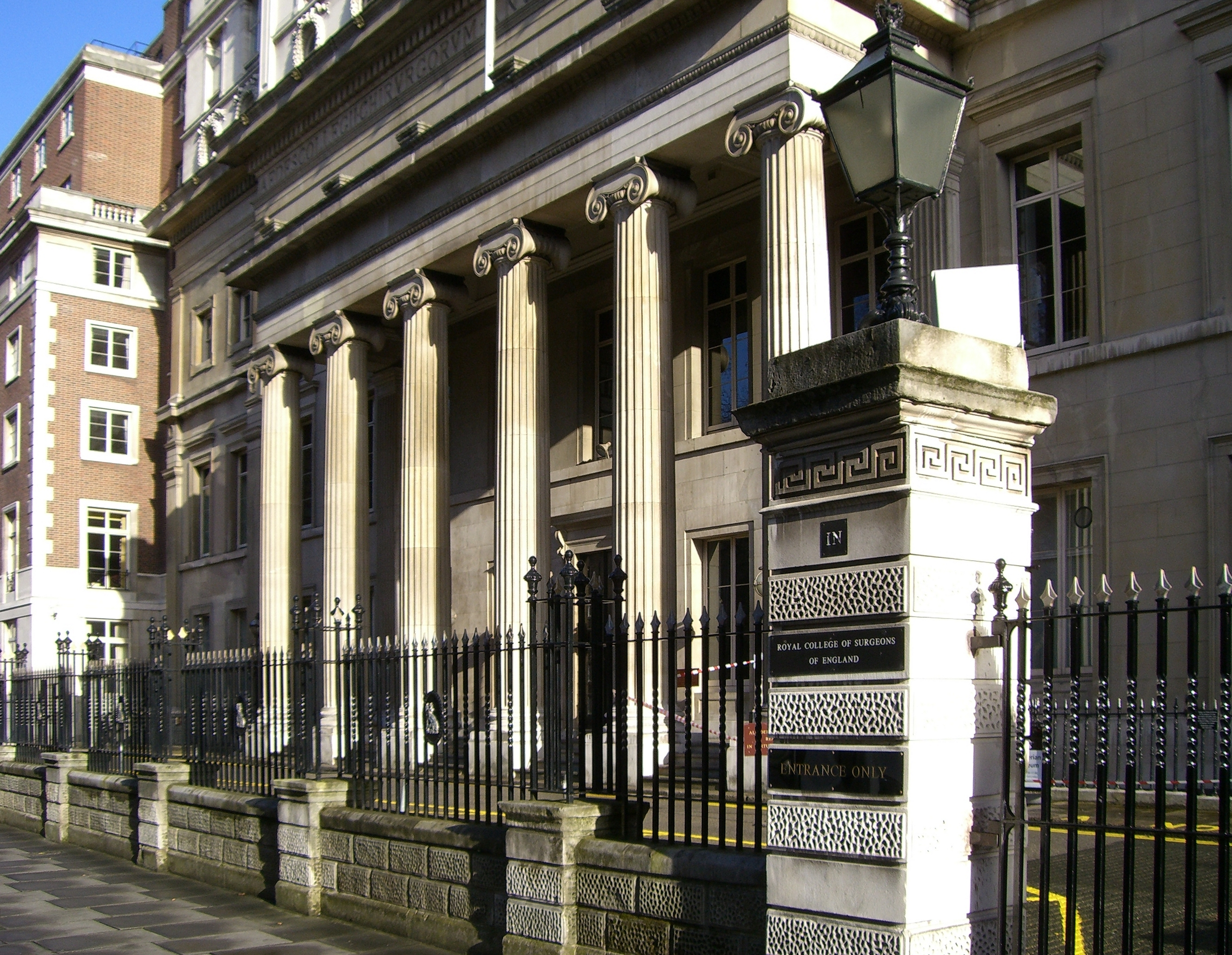
- Court: House of Lords
- Decided: 24 November 1966
- Citation: [1967] 2 AC 291

Case history
- Prior action: [1966] Ch 261

Court membership
- Judges sitting: Lord Reid, Lord Pearce, Lord Upjohn, Lord Donovan, Lord Wilberforce

Case opinions
- Majority: Lord Upjohn (Lord Pearce concurring), Lord Wilberforce
- Dissent: Lord Reid, Lord Donovan

Keywords
- Resulting trust

Area of law
- Trust

Vandervell v Inland Revenue Commissioners [1967] 2 AC 291 is a leading English trusts law case concerning express trusts, resulting trusts, equitable assignment, and section 53(1)(c) of the Law of Property Act 1925. This case was the first in a series of decisions involving Tony Vandervell's trusts and his tax liability and was later followed by Re Vandervell Trustees Ltd and Re Vandervell Trustees Ltd (No 2).

In 1958, Vandervell transferred, through his trust company, 100,000 shares to the Royal College of Surgeons. In the arrangement, his trust company received an option contract that would allow the trust to purchase the shares back for £5,000. Vandervell believed that this arrangement would allow him to avoid a surtax on the dividends, as the charity would not be subject to the surtax. In 1960, the Inland Revenue assessed Vandervell as being liable to surtax on the dividends on the shares, as if he had still owned the shares and received the dividends as income.

Vandervell appealed the Revenue's decision to the High Court, Court of Appeal, and House of Lords, which all found against Vandervell. The split decision at the House of Lords saw Lords Wilberforce, Upjohn, and Pearce affirming the lower courts' decision, with Lords Reid and Donovan holding in favour of Vandervell.

A majority of the court ruled that, in procuring the option for the trust company, Vandervell had inadvertently created a resulting trust that allowed him to retain a beneficial interest in the shares. On the evidence, the majority found that Vandervell had intended that the option would be held by the trust company on such trusts that he or the trustees would from time to time decide upon. The minority of the court held that the trust company held an absolute and beneficial interest in the option, with the trustees having the unfettered ability to decide how to dispose of the option. The Lords also, unanimously, found that an oral instruction to transfer a legal and beneficial interest in shares was not subject to the writing requirement under Law of Property Act 1925, section 53(1)(c).

== Facts ==
Tony Vandervell was a wealthy racing car manufacturer with a company called Vandervell Products Ltd. He wanted to donate to the Royal College of Surgeons to establish a chair of pharmacology. He also wanted to avoid paying tax on the donation. At the time, United Kingdom tax law recognised both stamp duties on outright donations as well as a dividends tax on company shares. However, since the Royal College of Surgeons was a charity, it was not liable to pay tax on any income.

In 1958, through a series of informal letters and oral instructions, Vandervell instructed his trust company (Vandervell Trustees Ltd, which was also set up to administer his money for his children) to transfer 100,000 shares in Vandervell Products Ltd to the Royal College of Surgeons, with an option for the trustees to purchase the shares back for £5,000. He then instructed the company to declare a dividend on the shares. Whilst the shares were in the possession of the Royal College of Surgeons, it paid out £245,000 in dividends up to 1961.

=== Procedural history ===
In 1960, the Inland Revenue assessed Vandervell as being liable to surtax on the dividends on the shares, as if he had not disposed of them. In 1964, the High Court heard an appeal by Vandervell against the IRC, dismissing the appeal. In 1965, Vandervell appealed to the Court of Appeal, who also dismissed the appeal. In 1966, Vandervell appealed to the House of Lords, only to have his case dismissed for the third time.

== Issues of law ==
Vandervell had made this arrangement as he believed it would allow him to avoid taxes, as opposed to simply retaining the shares, earning the dividends for himself, and then giving those earnings to the College. The IRC, however, argued that Vandervell retained at least an equitable interest in the shares.

=== High Court ===
Before the High Court, it was submitted on behalf of the Crown that section 415 of the Income Tax Act 1952 (as in force at the time of the hearing) applied, such that the dividends were "income arising under a settlement... payable to or applicable for the benefit of" a third party per subsection (1), thus allowing the dividends to be taxed as if it was "the income of the settlor". Further, it was submitted that Vandervell could not rely on the exception in subsection (1) for instances where income was divested absolutely, as Vandervell retained a beneficial interest in the shares, per subsection (2), because of the option the trustees held.

Vandervell, on the other hand, argued that all beneficial interest in the shares had been absolutely divested. His first submission was that he had performed an equitable assignment when he instructed the shares to be transferred. His second submission was that, because the trust company was also set up to administer his money for his children, the presumption of advancement arose in favour of his children, such that he himself retained no beneficial interest. His third submission was that, in regard to section 415(2), the option he retained did not confer a beneficial interest as the possibility of him ever availing himself of that benefit was de minimis.

=== Court of Appeal ===
At the Court of Appeal, the Crown argued, firstly, that Vandervell did not divest any beneficial interest in the shares as the attempted transfer of the equitable interest did not comply with the requirements of s 53(1)(c), Law of Property Act 1925 that such a "disposition of an equitable interest... must be in writing signed by" Vandervell or his agent. Rather, the Crown submitted that, although the legal estate was in the trust company, the shares were held on bare trust for Vandervell, who ultimately retained beneficial ownership, which he still retained even after the shares were transferred to the College. Second, they argued that there was the College held the shares on a presumptive resulting trust for Vandervell, as no consideration had been given in exchange for the shares. The Crown's third submission was the one they presented at the High Court.

Vandervell argued, firstly, that the transfer of the shares was a gift that served as an equitable assignment that completely transferred the beneficial interests to the College; secondly, "that the trustee company took the option beneficially"; and, thirdly, in the alternative to the second submission, that the trustee held the option for Vandervell's children.

=== House of Lords ===
At the House of Lords, the principle issue concerned section 53(1)(c) of the Law of Property Act 1925. The Crown placed reliance on the case of Grey v Inland Revenue Commissioners [1960] AC 1 in arguing that an equitable interest is "disposed" of when it ceases to exist. Vandervell's arguments placed weight on the ratio decidendi of Lord Diplock and Harman LJ in the Court of Appeal.

== Judgments ==
=== High Court ===
At the High Court, Sir Anthony Plowman ruled against all three of Vandervell's submissions.

On the first submission, Plowman J applied the rule in In re Wale [1956] 1 WLR 1346, where Sir Gerald Upjohn had reaffirmed the rule that "an assignment of an equitable estate need not be in any particular form... The language is immaterial if the meaning is plain." Notwithstanding, Plowman J found that Vandervell's instructions were "not an assignment of anything" but merely "record[ed] a decision... and then [gave his agent] authority to carry out that decision".

Plowman J also found that, in regard to the presumption of advancement argument, the factual matrix that would otherwise give rise to the presumption (i.e. "where a man has put property in the name of his children") could not be found in the instant case. When the trustee company took the option, they took it on trust, but there was no evidence to suggest that the option was held on trust on behalf of the children. Rather, "it had not been decided for whose benefit it was to be held". As such, the trustee company held the option on automatic resulting trust for Vandervell, as he had failed to completely dispose of the beneficial interest in the shares.

It followed that, as a result of there being "a resulting trust of the option in his favour", the s 415(2) argument failed.

=== Court of Appeal ===
The Court of Appeal unanimously dismissed the appeal.

On the issue of whether s 53(1)(c) of the Law of Property Act 1925 required any transfer of an equitable interest to be done in writing, Lord Justice Diplock (later Baron Diplock) found against the Crown. Diplock LJ ruled that section 53 did not apply in cases where the equitable interest was transferred along with the legal estate to the transferee, as "prima facie a transfer of the legal estate carries with it the absolute beneficial interest in the property transferred", such that "no separate transfer of the beneficial interest is necessary". Diplock LJ also held that the presumption argued by the crown was successfully rebutted as the oral evidence of Vandervell demonstrated an intention to give the College the shares. On the Crown's third submission, Diplock LJ largely agreed with the reasoning in the High Court.

Diplock LJ also found that, on the facts, none of Vandervell's argument could succeed. Vandervell did not intend to wholly dispose of all beneficial interest in the shares, as the transfer of the shares was contingent on receipt of the option, which Vandervell and his agents needed for financial reasons. There was also no evidence to suggest that it had been intended that the trust company should the option beneficially, but the oral evidence, the identity of the directors, and the language of the option show that the arrangement was made according to the intention of Vandervell. The submission as regards the children's settlement was also unsupported on the facts.

In concluding, Diplock LJ ruled:

The benefit of the option must have been held on behalf of some beneficiary pending its exercise or lapse. Equity abhors a beneficial vacuum... [P]ending a decision as to the trusts upon which the benefit of the option was to be held, the resulting trust in favour of the settlor continued, and I do not think it matters whether the right to declare such new trusts in the future was retained by the settlor or had been vested in the discretion of the trustee company.

Lord Justice Willmer, agreeing with Diplock and Plowman J, regarded the issue of law as whether Vandervell had rebutted the presumption that, in receiving the option from Vandervell for no consideration, the trustee company was to hold the option in favour of Vandervell. Willmer LJ found that Vandervell could not demonstrate that the option had been a mere gift from the Royal College to the trust company, nor could he produce sufficient evidence to demonstrate an intention of the trust company to hold the option beneficially or on behalf of the children.

=== House of Lords ===
The House of Lords, by three to two, found that Vandervell was indeed liable to pay tax on the £245,000 of dividends given to the Royal College of Surgeons.

All of the Lords held that the Law of Property Act 1925, section 53(1)(c), was not applicable to situations where a beneficiary directs his trustees to transfer full legal and equitable ownership to someone else. Although the court unanimously found that an oral declaration to a bare trustee to transfer the trust property to a third party absolutely for their own benefit is a valid disposition of interest, the majority of the Lords found that Vandervell had not in fact absolutely divested himself of his interest in the shares, since the trust company had an option to purchase the shares back, such that a resulting trust would operate. The consequence was that Vandervell, as the beneficiary, would remain liable to surtax on the associated dividend income.

==== Lord Reid (dissenting) ====
Lord Reid, in dissent, found in favour of Vandervell, ruling that there was no resulting trust. Applying the test that a resulting trust arises where the intention of the donor is apparently such that a volunteer did not "take beneficially", Lord Reid finds that, prima facie, the trustee company had an absolute right over the property, and, firstly, no evidence that the donor had intended for the company to not take beneficially and that he would retain a beneficial interest in the shares; secondly, that it can be inferred from the facts that the donor and his agent had intended the trustees to have an absolute and unfettered right over the option and the shares if the option was exercised. As such, Lord Reid found that Vandervell had absolutely divested himself of the shares.

[I]t is, I think, quite common for a testator to give to a legatee an absolute and unfettered right to property, although his hope and belief is that the legatee will not retain it for his own benefit but will use it in a manner which he thinks is in accordance with the wishes of the testator. In such a case the legatee takes the property beneficially. There is no resulting trust. If the legatee chooses to disregard any moral obligation there may be and put the property in his own pocket he is free to do so, and the testator's representatives have no legal remedy. In a popular sense the testator may be said to trust the legatee, but there is no trust in law. The same can apply to a donation inter vivos, and I think that that is what happened in this case.

— Lord Reid, (1966) 43 TC 555

==== Lord Upjohn (with whom Lord Pearce agreed) ====
Lord Upjohn, whilst disagreeing with Diplock LJ's assertion that "prima facie a transfer of the legal estate carries with it the absolute beneficial interest in the property transferred", found that, applying the correct test of determining the intention of the transferor, a transfer of legal estate made with the intention that the transferee be the beneficial owner would, a fortiori, include the transfer of the beneficial interest. It was possible to distinguish Vandervell's transfer from the previous case of Grey's, as in the latter's case, the equitable estate and legal estate had been separate.

On the issue of whether a resulting trust existed, Lord Upjohn regarded the contention as one of fact and not law. Whilst Lord Upjohn noted that a presumption of resulting trust arises whenever the documents of transfer are silent on the intentions of the transferor, the presumption is "easily rebutted". Reaffirming the rule in Fowkes v Pascoe, Lord Upjohn determined that, as an issue of fact, the House should be slow to depart form the findings of the Court of Appeal. Having agreed with the lower courts that the intention was such that the trustee company would hold the option on such trusts as the company or Vandervell should from time to time declare, Lord Upjohn found that there had, in fact, been a resulting trust for the Appellant, ruling in obiter that, even if the option was held upon such trusts as the trustees would declare at their discretion, Vandervell could always revoke that discretion.

Lord Upjohn, in obiter, further questioned whether the doctrine of presumptive resulting trust can be applied to options to purchase at all, but nonetheless found that it was unnecessary to decide on the issue as the evidence was sufficient to disregard the presumption:

In the courts below it seems to have been assumed that in these circumstances the Trustee Company unless they took beneficially held the option to acquire the shares upon a resulting trust for the Appellant... I am by no means convinced that any such presumption arises in the case of an option to purchase. I asked in vain for any authority upon the point. The grant of an option to purchase is very different from a grant of a legal estate in some real or personal property without consideration to a person nominated by the beneficial owner. The grantee of an option has not, in reality, an estate in the property... [A]n option confers no more than a contractual right to acquire property on payment of a consideration, and that seems to me a very different thing from the ordinary case where the doctrine of a resulting trust has been applied. However, it is a question of intention whether the Appellant and the Trustee Company intended that the option should be held by the Trustee Company beneficially or as a trustee and, if the latter, upon what trusts. As I think the facts and circumstances are sufficient for this purpose without resort to this long stop presumption, it is unnecessary finally to decide whether the doctrine of resulting trust does apply to an option.

===== Lord Donovan (dissenting) =====
Lord Donovan found, on the evidence, that Vandervell had intended to give the trustee company absolute and beneficial ownership of the option, with there being strong and "rational" reasons for such a grant to be made. Indeed, Lord Donovan found it irrational to conclude that Vandervell had intended to retain a right in the shares, in so doing knowingly subjecting himself to "a heavy liability for surtax", and subverting a principal goal of Vandervell to "save tax" by way of charitable donations.

==== Lord Wilberforce ====
Lord Wilberforce said that there was:

no need, or room to invoke a presumption. The conclusion, on the facts found, is simply that the option was vested in the trustee company as a trustee on trusts, not defined at the time, possibly to be defined later. But the equitable, or beneficial interest, cannot remain in the air: the consequence in law must be that it remains in the settlor.

== Academic commentary ==
Professor RC Nolan has argued that a trustee should not have to take instructions from a beneficiary with a limited interest in shares, because that would be contrary to the principle that a registered owner should vote in the interests of all beneficiaries.

== See also ==
- English trusts law
- Resulting trusts in English law
- Tinsley v Milligan [1994] 1 AC 340
- Tribe v Tribe [1996] Ch 107
- Westdeutsche Landesbank Girozentrale v Islington London Borough Council [1996] AC 669
- Air Jamaica Ltd v Charlton [1999] 1 WLR 1399
- Barclays Bank Ltd v Quistclose Investments Ltd [1970] AC 567
- Twinsectra Ltd v Yardley [2002] 2 AC 164
- Saunders v Vautier
