= Air Jamaica Ltd v Charlton =

1999 Judicial Committee of the Privy Council case

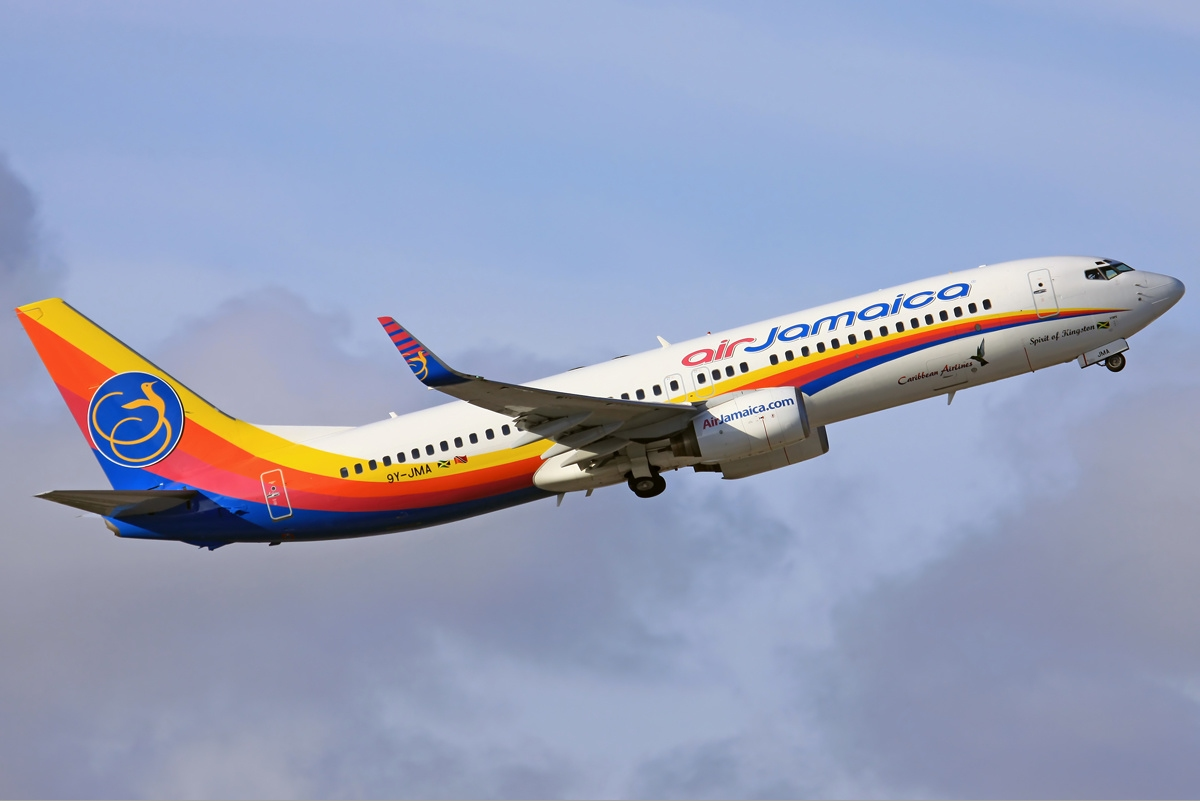
- Court: Judicial Committee of the Privy Council
- Citations: [1999] UKPC 20, [1999] 1 WLR 1399

Case history
- Prior action: Court of Appeal of Jamaica

Keywords
- Resulting trust

Air Jamaica Ltd v Charlton [1999], UKPC 20, is a leading case in English trusts law case at the Privy Council concerning resulting trusts.

== Background ==
Air Jamaica was the national airline of Jamaica, a former British colony whose judicial system included final rights of appeal to the Judicial Committee of the Privy Council. The rule against perpetuities prevents the creation of perpetual trust, or more precisely, a trust of a very long period of time. In the United Kingdom, statutory exemptions from the perpetuity rule have been enacted for pension trusts, but no such legislation had been passed in Jamaica.

Surpluses had arisen under Air Jamaica's pension trust fund, as the pension plan had been ended. The provisions of the trust deed relevant to the case were as follows:

4 No moneys which at any time have been contributed by the Company under the terms hereof shall in any circumstances be repayable to the Company.

["Section 13 of the Plan authorised the Company to amend the Plan from time to time and to discontinue the Plan at any time, but not so as to enable any part of the trust fund to be used otherwise than for the exclusive benefit of Members or other persons entitled to benefits under the Plan"]

13.3(ii) … any balance of the Fund shall be applied to provide additional benefits for Members and after their death for their widows or their designated beneficiaries in such equitable and non-discriminatory manner as the Trustees may determine...

In 1994, the company acted to amend the deed by replacing ss 4 and 13.3(ii) with terms that would allow for the creation of a trust that would hold the entirety of the surplus for the company, leaving nothing for the employees and pensioners.

=== David v Richards & Wallington ===
The Air Jamaica case was decided after the English law case Davis v Richards & Wallington [1990] 1 WLR 1511, which also involved surpluses under a pension scheme. In Davis, excess contributions from the employees and employers had resulted in a surplus under a pension fund scheme, whose trust deed did not contain provisions on how to manage such surpluses and was unamendable to include such provisions.

The position, historically, had been, as regards funds set up for the benefit of their members (typically in the context of unincorporated associations that are later dissolved), surpluses would be distributed among the contributers by way of resulting trust according to how much they had contributed to the fund.

The judge in Davis, however, ruled that the surplus from the employers' contribution would be held on resulting trust for the employers, but he also found that the surplus from the employee's contribution would be bona vacatia based on practical, statutory, and legal difficulties. These difficulties, however, were not present in the Air Jamaica case. Further, the surplus in Air Jamaica also arose from the failure of the trust and not excess contributions.

== Issues of law ==
After Air Jamaica had made the 1994 amendments, the beneficiaries filed suit against the company, with the Attorney-General of Jamaica intervening. At trial, the court found in favour of the Crown's arguments, such that the surplus were bona vacantia, as neither the pension trusts nor the amendments were valid for perpetuity. The Privy Council found this reasoning "inconsistent", noting that the existence of a trust surplus logically requires there to be a trust in the first place, with such trust having been satisfied and thus creating the surplus. The judge also found that the beneficiaries had "received all the benefits to which they were entitled" and as such a resulting trust could not arise.

At the Jamaican Court of Appeal, a two-thirds majority found in favour of the beneficiaries on a number of grounds. They found that the (i) beneficiaries had contractual rights to the surpluses and not merely equitable rights arising from the trust; (ii) the rule against perpetuity was not applicable as the duration of each beneficiary's interest could be regarded as falling within the relevant perpetuity period at law; (iii) the plan was discontinued in 1994; (iv) the 1994 amendments were invalid; and (v) the surplus should be paid to the beneficiaries according to s 13.3(ii).

The two major issues for the Privy Council were whether the 1994 amendments were valid and where the surplus ought to go.

Issues
Issues	Sub-issues	Company	Attorney-General	Court of Appeal
Whether the pension scheme was void for perpetuity?	Whether the beneficiaries' rights arose out of contract?	-	-	Yes
Whether the pension scheme was void for perpetuity?	Whether each beneficiary was "a relevant life in being whose interest must vest in possession on his own retirement or death"?	-	-	Yes
Whether the pension scheme was void for perpetuity?	Whether the trust was void ab initio?	Yes	Yes	No
Validity of the 1994 amendments	Whether the pension plan had been discontinued	Yes	Yes	No
Validity of the 1994 amendments	Whether the 1994 amendments were valid?	Yes	-	No
Destination of the surplus	Whether clause 4 precluded the existence of a resulting trust for the company?	No	Yes	Yes
Destination of the surplus	Whether the beneficiaries had received everything they were entitled to?	-	Yes	No
Destination of the surplus	Whether the surplus was bona vacantia?	No	Yes	No
Destination of the surplus	Whether the surplus must be distributed according to the original s 13.3(ii)?	No	No	Yes

== Decision ==
Lord Millett, in delivering the decision of the court, held:

1. That the beneficiaries' rights arose from trust, and not contract
2. Each beneficiary was a "life in being"
3. The trust was not fully void ab initio, although s 13.3 was for perpetuity
4. The pension scheme was discontinued
5. The 1994 amendments were invalid
6. Clause 4 did not preclude the existence of a resulting trust
7. The beneficiaries had not received everything they were entitled to
8. The surplus was not bona vacantia
9. The surplus had to be distributed according to the original deed

He according ruled that the surplus was to be distributed to the beneficiaries according to their contributions to the fund.

=== Separate settlement with mutual insurance analysis: [29]-[35] ===
Lord Millett held that

Clause 13.3 would usually be void for perpetuity because there was no statutory exemption in Jamaica to the common law rule. But with each new member, there was a new settlement, and each member was a life in being, so the termination of a new settlement could in fact be calculated, and so the scheme was in fact not void for perpetuity.

== Advice ==
The Privy Council advised that a resulting trust of the surplus funds could still arise in favour of the company, and so it would not be bona vacantia.

The powers for the trustees to change the settlement's terms were void for perpetuity, and so was the power for the widows to designate a beneficiary to receive benefits, because these were only contingent on termination of the plan itself which could occur more than 21 years after the death of any particular beneficiary. (The individual settlements were contingent on the death of each individual beneficiary under the scheme.) In any event, the scheme's terms prohibited granting beneficial rights in the scheme to the company in clause 4. But a resulting trust for the company could still exist.

Lord Millett remarked that although Mr Vandervell, in Re Vandervell No 2 did not wish the share option to result to him, he did not wish to make an outright gift to the trustee company either. A presumption in the transferor's favour can only be made where there is no evidence that there was an intention to create a trust, or make a gift, or make a loan of the property to the transferee.

;The validity of the 1994 amendments

41. Their Lordships are satisfied that the 1994 amendments are incurably bad. There are several reasons for this. In the first place, as their Lordships have already explained, any power to amend the trusts is void for perpetuity. This does not mean that an amendment is wholly without effect. An employee who joins the Plan after an amendment makes his settlement upon the trusts of the Plan as amended. But an amendment cannot affect existing Members. The 1994 amendments, which were made after the Plan had been closed to new Members, were therefore without effect.

42. In the second place, and perpetuity apart, the Company’s power to amend the Plan was subject to an obligation to exercise it in good faith: see Imperial Group Pension Trust Ltd v Imperial Tobacco Ltd [1991] 1 W.L.R. 589. The Company was not entitled simply to disregard or override the interests of the Members. Once it became likely that the Plan would be wound up, the Company would have to take this fact into account, and it is difficult to see how the Plan could lawfully be amended in any significant respect once it had actually been discontinued. But even if it could, their Lordships are satisfied that it could not be amended in order to confer any interest in the trust fund on the Company. This was expressly prohibited by clause 4 of the Trust Deed. The 1994 amendments included a purported amendment to the Trust Deed to remove this limitation, but this was plainly invalid. The trustees could not achieve by two steps what they could not achieve by one.

Destination of the surplus

43. Prima facie the surplus is held on a resulting trust for those who provided it. This sometimes creates a problem of some perplexity. In the present case, however, it does not. Contributions were payable by the Members with matching contributions by the Company. In the absence of any evidence that this is not what happened in practice, the surplus must be treated as provided as to one half by the Company and as to one half by the Members.

44. The Attorney-General contended that neither the Company nor the Members can take any part in the surplus, which has reverted to the Crown as bona vacantia. He argued that clause 4 of the Trust Deed precludes any claim by the Company, while the Members cannot claim any part of the surplus because they have received all that they are entitled to. There is authority for both propositions. Their Lordships consider that they can be supported neither in principle nor as a matter of construction.

45. In In re A.B.C. Television Ltd. Pension Scheme unreported, 22nd May 1973 Foster J. held that a clause similar to clause 4 of the present Trust Deed "negatives the possibility of implying a resulting trust". This is wrong in principle. Like a constructive trust, a resulting trust arises by operation of law, though unlike a constructive trust it gives effect to intention. But it arises whether or not the transferor intended to retain a beneficial interest - he almost always does not - since it responds to the absence of any intention on his part to pass a beneficial interest to the recipient. It may arise even where the transferor positively wished to part with the beneficial interest, as in Vandervell v Inland Revenue Commissioners [1967] 2 A.C. 291. In that case the retention of a beneficial interest by the transferor destroyed the effectiveness of a tax avoidance scheme which the transferor was seeking to implement. The House of Lords affirmed the principle that a resulting trust is not defeated by evidence that the transferor intended to part with the beneficial interest if he has not in fact succeeded in doing so. As Plowman J. had said in the same case at first instance ([1966] Ch. 261 at p. 275):-

"As I see it, a man does not cease to own property simply by saying ‘I don’t want it.’ If he tries to give it away the question must always be, has he succeeded in doing so or not?"

46. Lord Upjohn expressly approved this at p. 314.

47. Consequently their Lordships think that clauses of this kind in a pension scheme should generally be construed as forbidding the repayment of contributions under the terms of the scheme, and not as a pre-emptive but misguided attempt to rebut a resulting trust which would arise dehors the scheme. The purpose of such clauses is to preclude any amendment that would allow repayment to the Company. Their Lordships thus construe clause 4 of the Trust Deed as invalidating the 1994 amendments, but not as preventing the Company from retaining a beneficial interest by way of a resulting trust in so much of the surplus as is attributable to its contributions.

48. The Members’ contributions stand on a similar footing. In Davis v. Richards & Wallington Industries Ltd. [1990] 1 W.L.R. 1511 Scott J. held that the fact that a party has received all that he bargained for is not necessarily a decisive argument against a resulting trust, but that in the circumstances of the case before him a resulting trust in favour of the employees was excluded. The circumstances that impressed him were twofold. He considered that it was impossible to arrive at a workable scheme for apportioning the employees’ surplus among the different classes of employees and he declined, at page 1544 to "impute to them an intention that would lead to an unworkable result". He also considered that he was precluded by statute from "imputing to the employees an intention" that they should receive by means of a resulting trust sums in excess of the maximum permitted by the relevant tax legislation.

49. These formulations also adopt the approach to intention that their Lordships have already considered to be erroneous. Their Lordships would observe that, even in the ordinary case of an actuarial surplus, it is not obvious that, when employees are promised certain benefits under a scheme to which they have contributed more than was necessary to fund them, they should not expect to obtain a return of their excess contributions. In the present case, however, the surplus does not arise from overfunding but from the failure of some of the trusts. It is impossible to say that the Members "have received all that they bargained for". One of the benefits they bargained for was that the trustees should be obliged to pay them additional benefits in the event of the scheme’s discontinuance. It was the invalidity of this trust that gave rise to the surplus. Their Lordships consider that it would be more accurate to say that the Members claim such part of the surplus as is attributable to their contributions because they have not received all that they bargained for.

50. Pension schemes in Jamaica, as in England, need the approval of the Inland Revenue if they are to secure the fiscal advantages that are made available. The tax legislation in both countries places a limit on the amount which can be paid to the individual employee. Allowing the employees to enjoy any part of the surplus by way of resulting trust would probably exceed those limits. This fact is not, however, in their Lordships’ view a proper ground on which to reject the operation of a resulting trust in favour of the employees. The Inland Revenue had an opportunity to examine the Pension Plan and to withhold approval on the ground that some of its provisions were void for perpetuity. They failed to do so. There is no call to distort principle in order to meet their requirements. The resulting trust arises by operation of the general law, dehors the pension scheme and the scope of the relevant tax legislation.

51. Scott J. was impressed by the difficulty of arriving at a workable scheme for apportioning the surplus funds among the Members and the executors of deceased Members. This was because he thought it necessary to value the benefits that each Member had received in order to ascertain his share in the surplus. On the separate settlement with mutual insurance analysis which their Lordships have adopted in the present case, however, no such process is required. The Members’ share of the surplus should be divided pro rata among the Members and the estates of deceased Members in proportion to the contributions made by each Member without regard to the benefits each has received and irrespective of the dates on which the contributions were made.

Lord Steyn, Lord Hope, Sir Christopher Slade and Sir Andrew Leggatt concurred.

== See also ==
- English trusts law
- English land law
- English property law
