= Re Vandervell Trustees Ltd =

- Court: House of Lords
- Citation: [1971] AC 912

Keywords
- Income tax

Re Vandervell Trustees Ltd [1971] AC 912 is a UK tax law case, concerning the ability of the Inland Revenue to amend tax assessments.

This case was the second in a series of decisions involving Tony Vandervell's trusts and his tax liability. The first was Vandervell v Inland Revenue Commissioners, which concerned whether an oral instruction to transfer an equitable interest in shares complied with the writing requirement under Law of Property Act 1925, section 53(1)(c), and so whether receipt of dividends was subject to tax.

The third was Re Vandervell Trustees Ltd (No 2), which concerned whether Vandervell could be taxed on dividend income (as beneficiary of a resulting trust) if the exercise of an option had validly transferred the beneficial interest in that income to another trust (of which he was not a beneficiary).

== Facts ==
Lord Diplock also summarised the facts as follows.

My Lords, between July and October 1967 the executors of the late Mr. Vandervell were served with notices of assessment to surtax for the years 1962-63, 1963-64 and 1964-65 upon dividends which had been paid to the Vandervell Trustees, Ltd. as trustees of a settlement made by Mr. Vandervell in 1949. The assessments were made on the basis that the shares on which the dividends were paid were held by the trustees on a resulting trust in favour of Mr. Vandervell. The executors have given notice of appeal against the assessments.

Section 5 (6) of the Income Tax Management Act 1964 provides that after notice of assessment has been served 'the assessment shall not be altered except in accordance with the express provisions of the Income Tax Acts.' The only way in which an assessment can be altered under the provisions of the Income Tax Acts is by the special commissioners on an appeal to them by the party assessed. The powers of alteration are conferred by section 52 (5) and (6) of the Income Tax Act 1952, as amended by the Income Tax Management Act 1964, and made applicable to surtax assessments by section 229 (4) of the Income Tax Act 1952 . Section 52 (5) and (6) are as follows: *941

'(5) If, on an appeal, it appears to the majority of the commissioners present at the hearing, by examination of the appellant on oath or affirmation, or by other lawful evidence, that the appellant is overcharged by any assessment or surcharge, the commissioners shall abate or reduce the assessment or surcharge accordingly, but otherwise every such assessment or surcharge shall stand good. (6) If, on any appeal, it appears to the commissioners that the person assessed or surcharged ought to be charged in an amount exceeding the amount contained in the assessment or surcharge, they shall charge him with the excess.'

The executors have not been paid the dividends. In 1968 they brought proceedings against the trustees to recover them. These were started by originating summons but are now being continued as a witness action with pleadings. Issues of fact as well as issues of law are involved. The trustees resist the claim upon the ground that at the time the dividends were received the late Mr. Vandervell had already parted with his beneficial interest in the shares or, if not in the shares, at any rate in the dividends declared on them. Alternatively, they say that Mr. Vandervell disposed of his interest in the dividends in 1965 after they had been received by the trustees.

If the executors recover the dividends from the trustees or if they fail to recover because Mr. Vandervell did not dispose of his interest in them until 1965, the estate of the late Mr. Vandervell will be liable to surtax in the amounts assessed on the executors. It is only if Mr. Vandervell was not entitled to the beneficial interest in the dividends at the time when they were received by the trustees that the executors would be entitled to have the assessments to surtax reduced by the special commissioners. But the onus of proving this to the satisfaction of the special commissioners would lie upon the executors; and the special commissioners would not be bound by any findings of fact made by the court in the action between the executors and the trustees. As respects any ruling by the court upon questions of law involved, the special commissioners would have to follow it, but it would be open to the commissioners of Inland Revenue (whom I will call 'the board') to appeal by way of case stated and to carry that appeal to an appellate court which might not be bound by the ruling of the court in which the proceedings between the executors and the trustees terminated.

== Judgment ==
The House of Lords held the court had no jurisdiction under R.S.C., Order 15, regulation 6(2), to order that the Inland Revenue Commissioners would be added as a party to the proceedings, so that it could be determined if dividends belonged to the executors (which would mattered for tax liability) and the decision would be binding on the commissioners.

== See also ==
- UK tax law
- English trusts law
