= Re Vinogradoff =

English trust law case

In re Vinogradoff
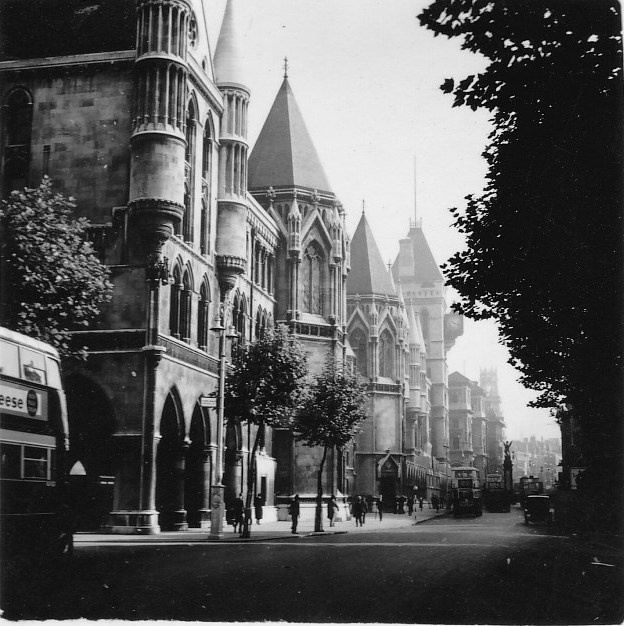
- Court: High Court of Justice of England & Wales: Chancery Division
- Full case name: In re Vinogradoff, Allen v. Jackson
- Decided: 7 March 1935
- Citation: [1935] W.N. 68; 179 L.T. Jo. 274.

Ruling
- A resulting trust arises upon a voluntary transfer of personalty without further qualification from the settlor as to the purpose of the same notwithstanding an infant trustee.

Court membership
- Judge sitting: Farwell J.

Keywords
- Infant—Transfer of stock into joint names of transferor and transferee—Presumption—Resulting trust—Transferee aged four years at date of transfer—Law of Property Act, 1925 (15 Geo. 5, c. 0), s. 20.

In re Vinogradoff, commonly referred to as Re Vinogradoff, was a 1935 case which concerned a resulting trust in relation to the transfer of pure personalty, a War Loan the value of £800, from a grandmother to her granddaughter. The question of law was whether the transfer was (i) a gift or, alternatively, (ii) was held on trust for the grandmother upon transfer by her four-year old granddaughter. Notwithstanding any consideration of whether the transfer was gratuitous per se, there was yet the issue of whether an infant could be a trustee in light of section 20 of the Law of Property Act 1925.

== Background of legal principles ==
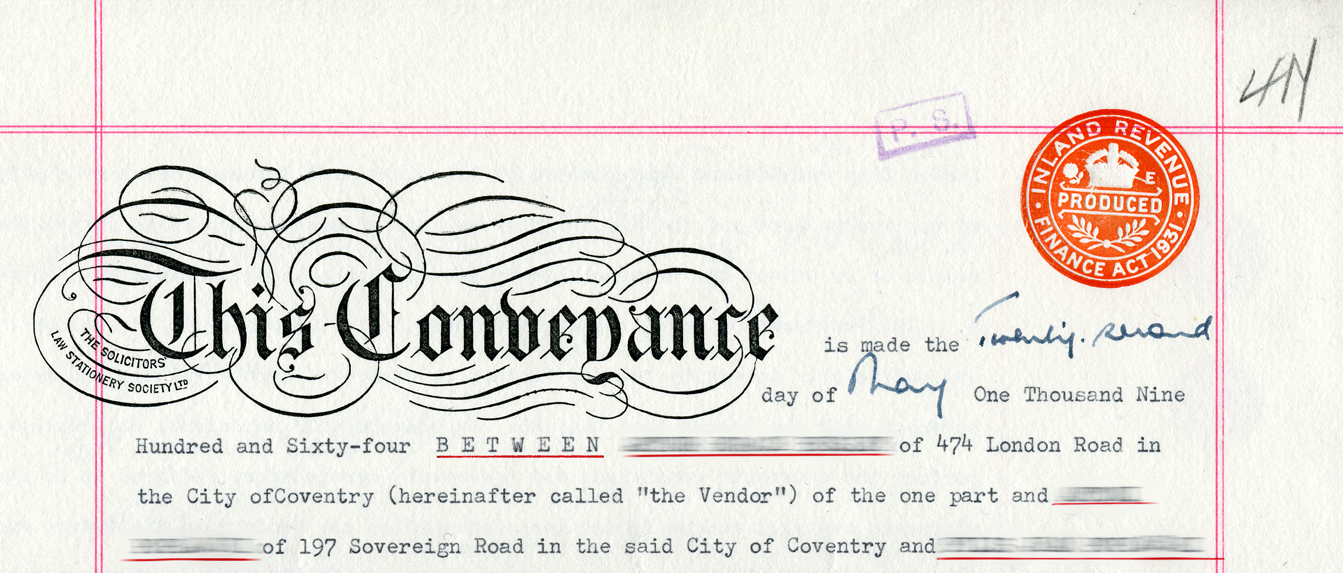
A deed of conveyance for realty

=== The prima facie position in a voluntary transfer of personalty ===
The law surrounding the case holds that upon a voluntary transfer of pure personalty, the one who receives the property, the transferee, is presumed to be holding on resulting trust the property of the transferor in the absence of any declaration by the transferor that the transfer was done with the intention of gifting the property to the transferee or vesting it in him for the purpose of holding for a cestui que trust other than the settlor himself. This was the case too for realty by virtue of the Statute of Uses 1535, however, section 60(3) of the Law of Property Act 1925 abolished the implied resulting trust, as was confirmed in Lohia v. Lohia, and thus, prima facie, a voluntary conveyance of land is to be seen as transferring both the legal and equitable interest to the transferee. However, as regards pure personalty, the presumption of a resulting trust may be rebutted by adducing evidence to negative the presumption. It can be said this is the default position for transferred pure personalty.

=== Special relationships and the presumption of advancement ===
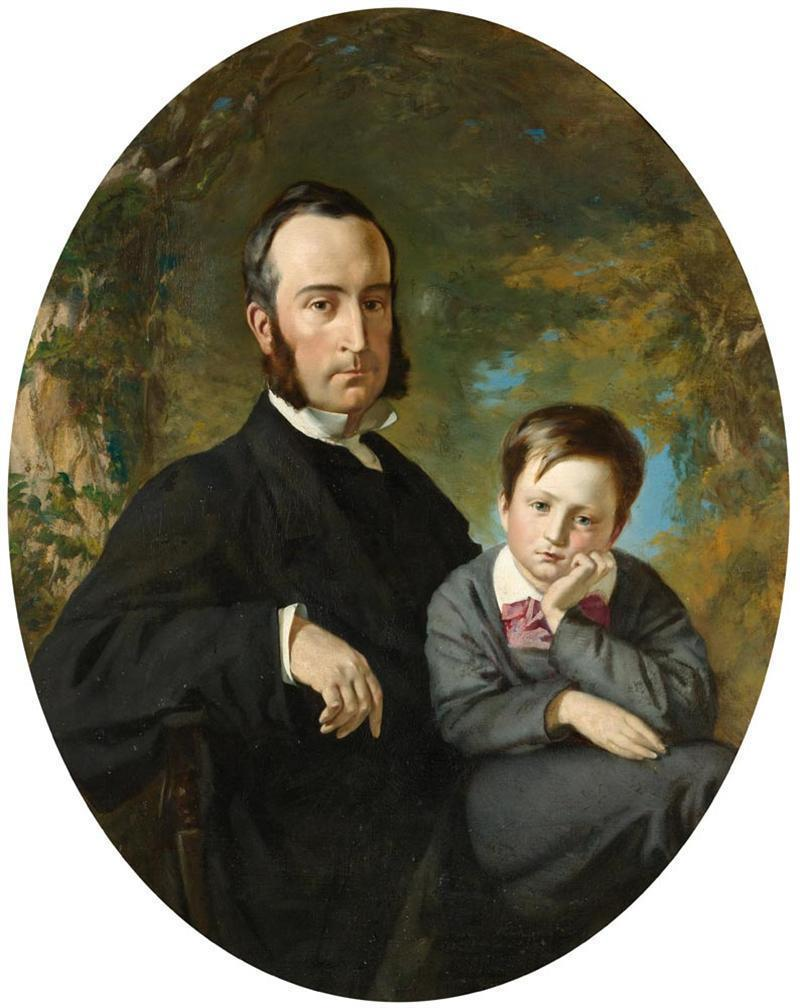
Father and Son by Frank Buchser

If, however, the transferor is a husband and the transferee is his wife, or, the transferor is a father or male carer, and the transferee a legitimate child of said father, or in the case of an in loco parentis carer, a quasi-child, then the presumption of advancement is imposed by the court. The presumption of advancement presumes that the transfer, in the aforesaid relationships, is a gift. In such an instance, evidence may be adduced to rebut the presumption of advancement and show that, instead, the legitimate child of the father, or the quasi-child, or wife, was trustee of the property in question. It is crucial to add, the authorities now do suggest that a mother to child transfer would also engage the presumption of advancement as implicitly mentioned in Antoni v. Antoni by use of gender-neutral terminology in explaining the presumption: 'when a parent places assets in the name of a child and assumes that the parent intends to make a gift to the child'. Re Vinogradoff concerns the first instance of resulting trusts, viz., where there exists a presumption of a resulting trust in light of an absence of manifest intention between a transferor and transferee of no relationship amounting to that which would engage the presumption of advancement. It should further be added that, whether a presumption of resulting trust exists, or, the counter-presumption of advancement exists, these are to be considered "Type A" resulting trusts, where intention is presumed or adduced. A further "Type B" of resulting trusts exist. These are commonly considered "automatic" resulting trusts; though there has been disagreement on the matter. Especially with what role intention has to play in Type B.

=== The complication of section 20 of the Law of Property Act ===
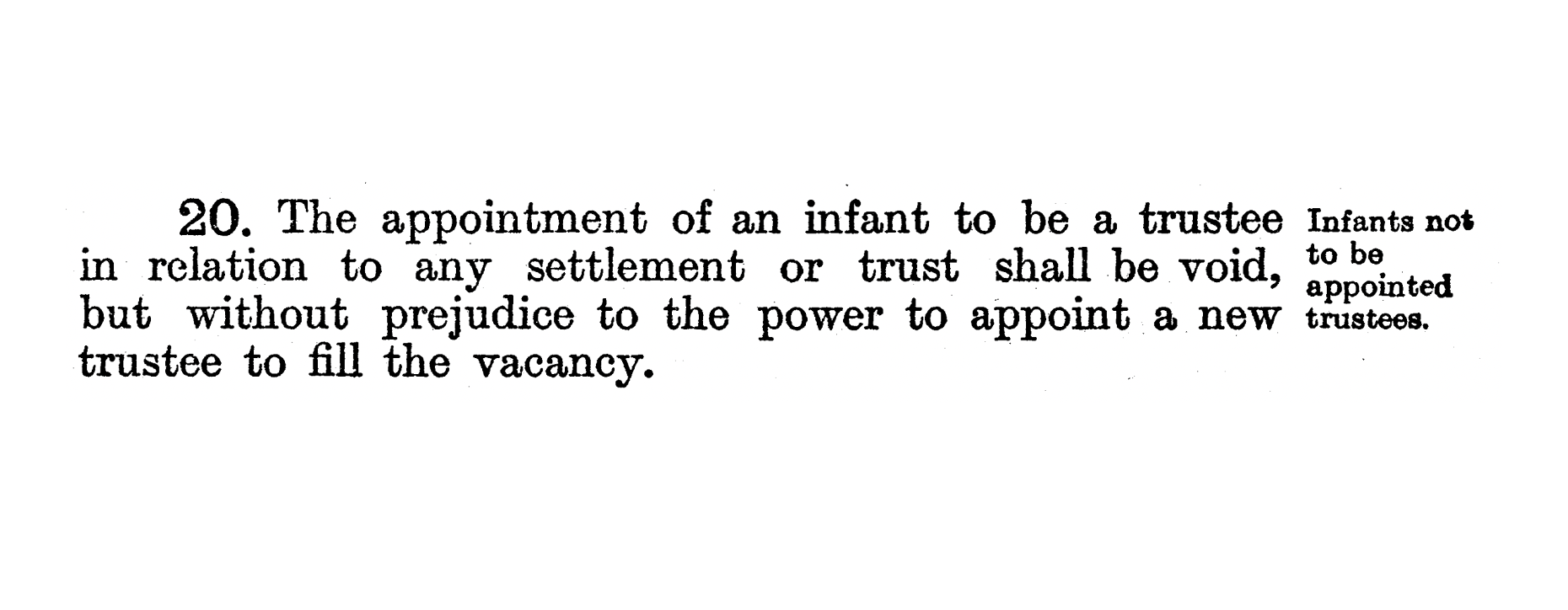
Section 20 of the Law of Property Act 1925 as printed originally by the King's printer.

There is, however, a further layer of complication. Be as it may that, in a relational matrix which does not satisfy the parameters of the presumption of advancement, a resulting trust is presumed, what if, then, the purported trustee is an infant? Section 20 of the Law of Property Act 1925 provides, in full, that:

The appointment of an infant to be a trustee in relation to any settlement or trust shall be void, but without prejudice to the power to appoint a new trustee to fill the vacancy.

It is precisely this issue, alongside whether the transfer was gratuitous, with which Farwell J. dealt in the case of Vinogradoff.

== Facts of the case ==
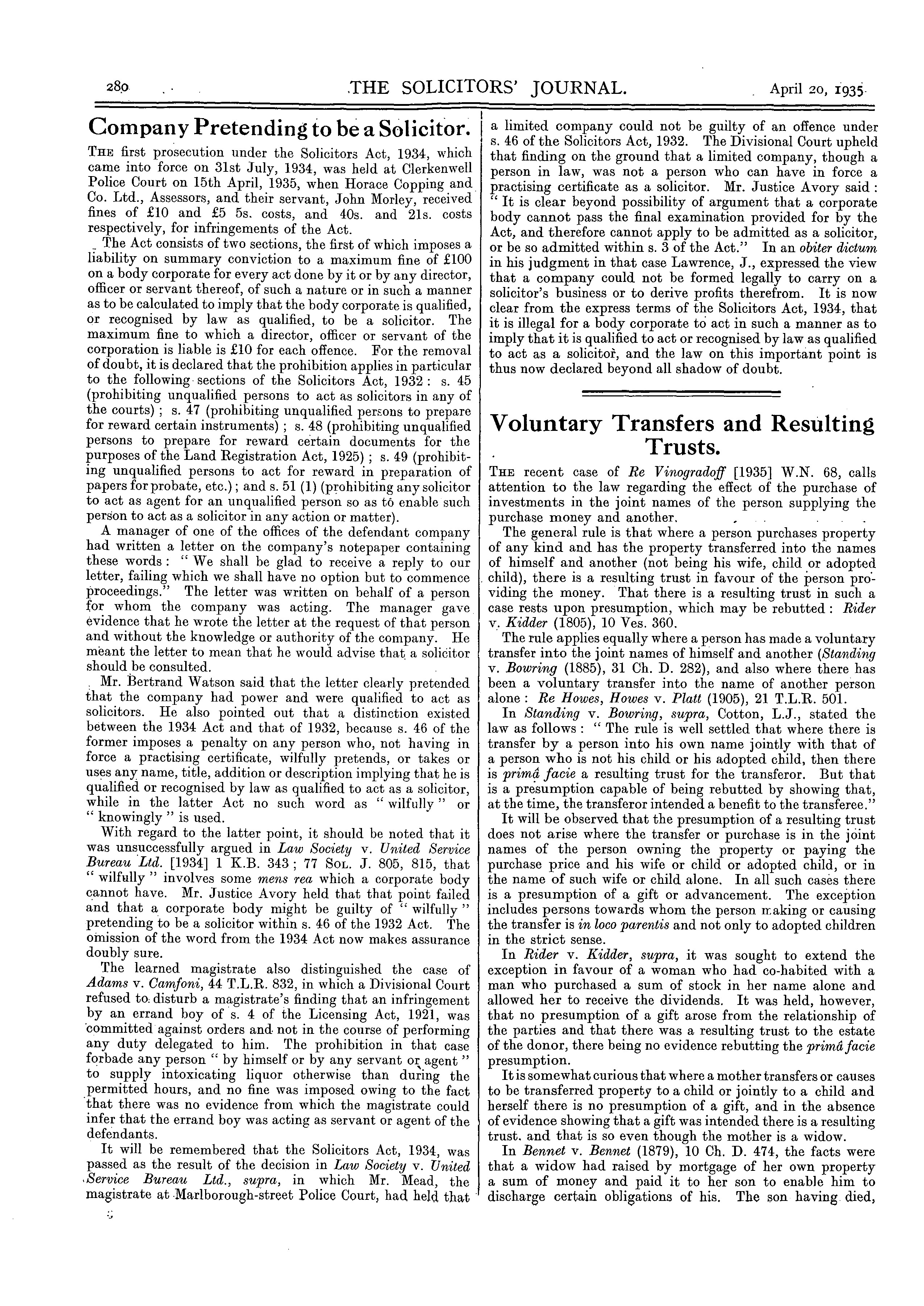
In re Vinogradoff as mentioned in the Solicitors' Journal, 1935.

In 1926, the testatrix transferred a sum of £800 War Loan to her granddaughter, Laura Huth Jackson, the daughter of Helen Lee, into the joint names of herself (the testatrix) and her granddaughter, making them joint owners and thus liable to jus accrescendi. The granddaughter remained in the care of her parents. The testatrix executed her will, dated 14 May 1934. In the will, the testatrix gave a life interest to her daughter, Helen Lee, in her residuary estate. The testatrix died on 23 May 1934. The granddaughter was thus, by virtue of the jus accrescendi, left the sole-owner of the War Loan, in law.

== Issues, and submissions of Counsel ==
The daughter endeavoured to prove that in equity the beneficial interest had not absolutely transferred to the granddaughter upon the testatrix's death, but rather, that the interest was and had always been held on resulting trust for the benefit of the grandmother, and, by virtue of her death, therefore, for the benefit of her residuary legatee, who in this case was the daughter, Helen Lee.

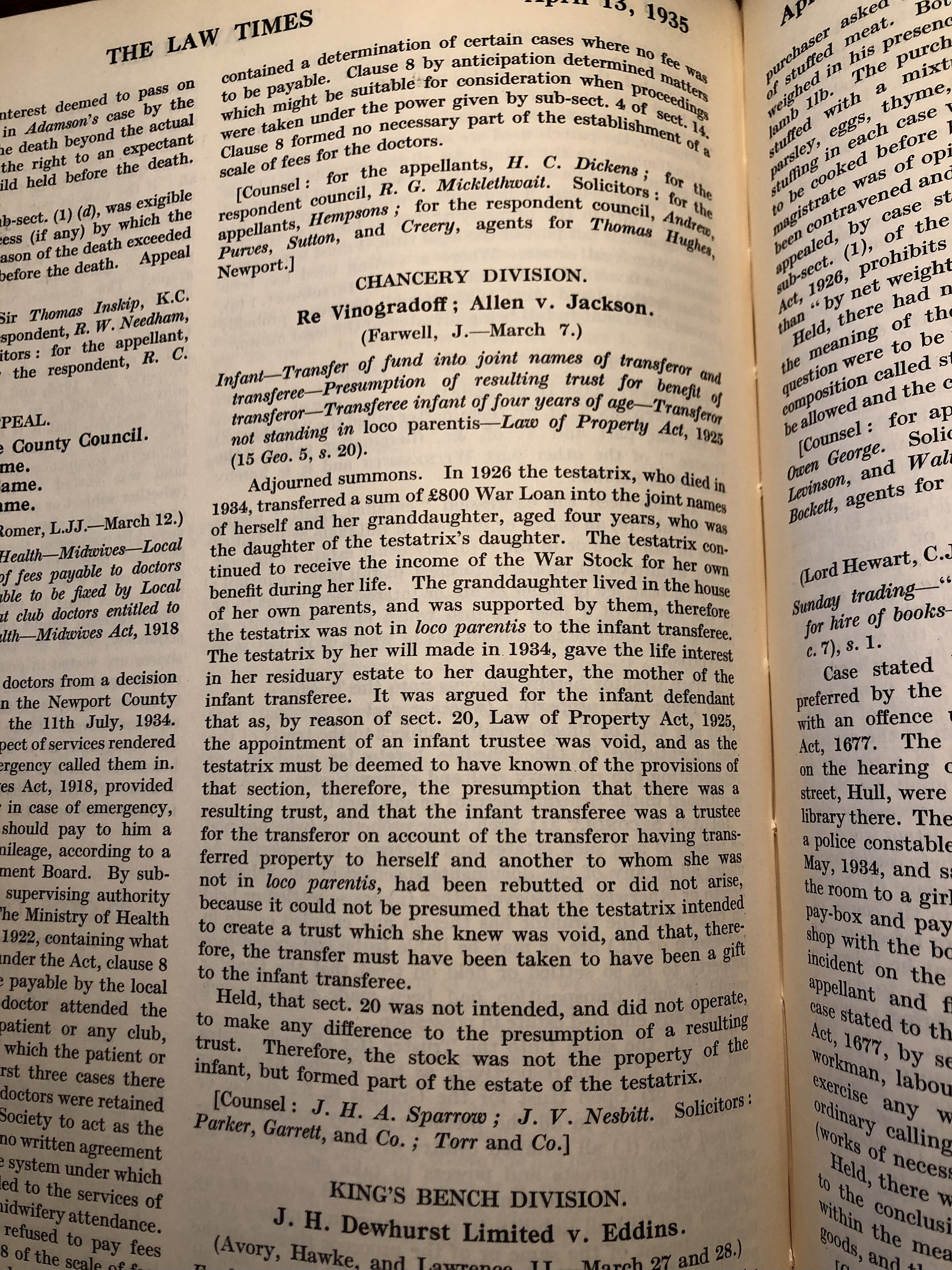
The Law Times Journal report of In re Vinogradoff.

The plaintiffs asked the court for '(1) The determination of the question whether the defendant, Laura Huth Jackson, had any and if so what beneficial interest in the 800l. War Loan; (2) an order that the right to call for a transfer of the War Loan should vest in the plaintiffs', who were the executors.

J. V. Nesbitt for Laura Huth Jackson, the defendant, submitted that, given the age of the granddaughter (four years of age), in the situation, the presumed resulting trust was rebutted. It was further submitted that by virtue of section 20 of the Law of Property Act 1925, the appointment of the granddaughter as trustee would have in any way been void; and J. V. Nesbitt submitted it ought to have been 'assumed that at the date of the transfer the transferor knew of the provisions of that section'. J. V. Nesbitt submitted it followed the sum was a gift.

== Judgment ==
Unfortunately, the words of Farwell J. upon handing down judgment were never recorded verbatim. However, the Weekly Notes law report (W.N. 68.) reported the following:

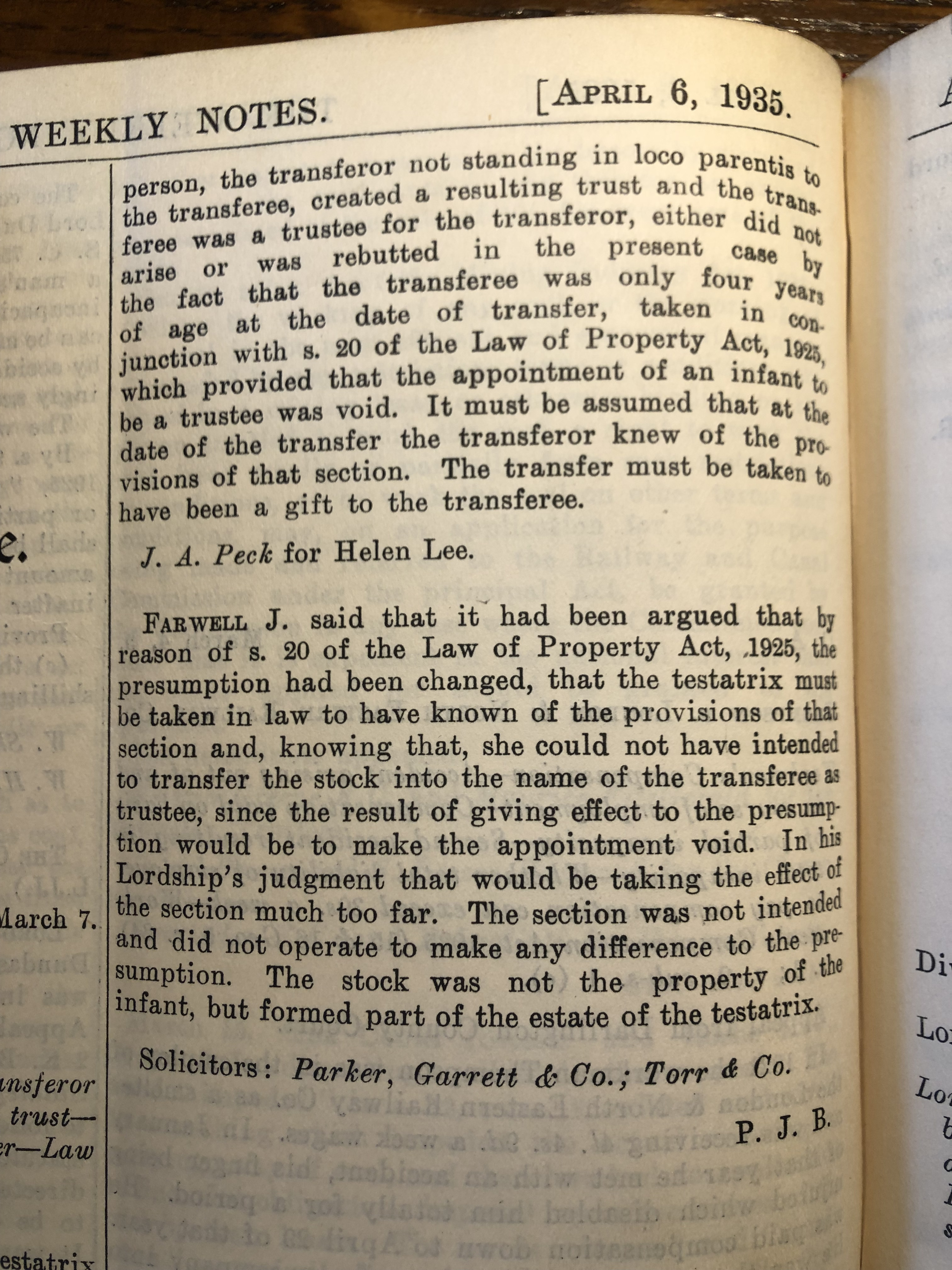
In re Vinogradoff in the Weekly Notes law report.

FARWELL J. said that it had been argued that by reason of s. 20 of the Law of Property Act, 1925, the presumption had been changed, that the testatrix must be taken in law to have known of the provisions of that section and, knowing that, she could not have intended to transfer the stock into the name of the transferee as trustee, since the result of giving effect to the presumption would be to make the appointment void. In his Lordship’s judgment that would be taking the effect of the section much too far. The section was not intended and did not operate to make any difference to the presumption. The stock was not the property of the infant, but formed part of the estate of the testatrix.

The effect of the judgment was such: although, by virtue of the provision, an infant could not be appointed a trustee, they could, by a necessary operation of the law, hold property on resulting trust.

== Criticism of the decision ==
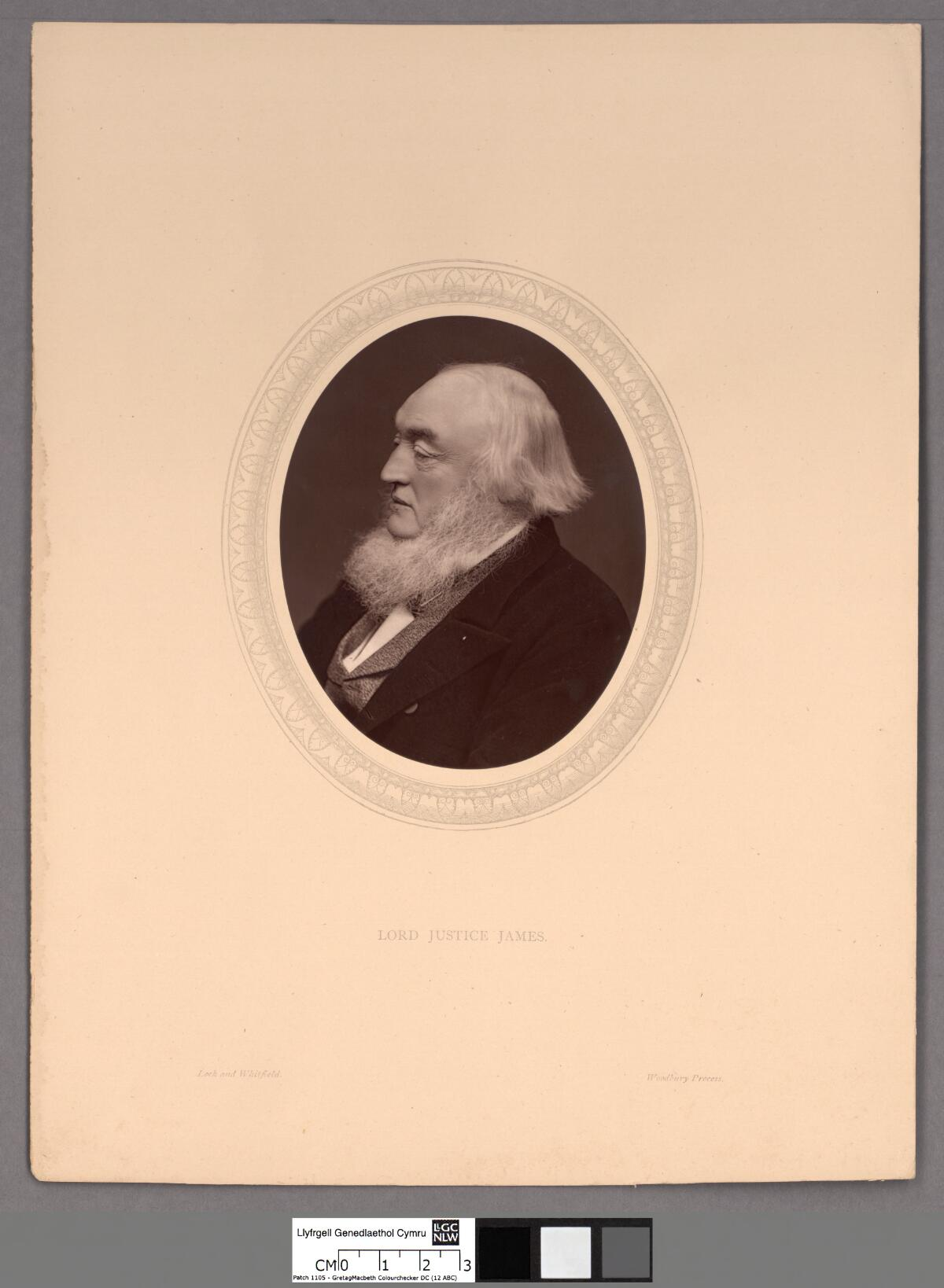
James L.J. who presided over Fowkes v. Pascoe.

R. E. Megarry and P. V. Baker point out the illogical finding of Farwell J.: '[he] held that there was a presumption that A intended the stock to be held on trust for herself, but rather surprisingly held that this was not rebutted by the circumstances'. The two also cite the case of Fowkes v. Pascoe, where Sir W.M. James L.J., presented by a case with circumstances quite in pari materia, said: 'Is it possible to reconcile with mental sanity the theory that she put £250 into the names of herself and her companion, and £250 into the names of herself and Defendant, as trustees upon trust for herself? What trust—what object is there conceivable in doing this?' It appears equally inconceivable why the testatrix in Vinogradoff should have wished to establish a resulting trust for her benefit with no seemingly greater purpose than that to have her title boomerang arbitrarily. In the circumstances, it appears the proper inference of the court in conjunction with the evidence ought to have been, on the balance of probabilities, that the transfer was gratuitous. Nevertheless, Farwell J. found contrarily. And, though there is doubt as to the soundness of the application of the principles, Vinogradoff stands as good law in the principles it consolidated, and as a pillar of resulting trusts law.
