= Pettitt v Pettitt =

- Citation: [1970] AC 777
- Transcript: judgment

Court membership
- Judges sitting: Lord Reid, Lord Morris of Borth-y-Gest, Lord Hodson, Lord Upjohn, Lord Diplock

Pettitt v Pettitt [1970] AC 777 is a leading English trusts law case, concerning the presumption of advancement and a spouse's equitable interest in the matrimonial home.

== Facts ==
The wife had used her own money to buy a house during the marriage, meaning the title to the house had been in the wife's name, and both she and her husband resided in it until the wife left the husband. The husband claimed that he had carried out a considerable number of improvements to the house and garden. These improvements consisted of internal decoration work, building a wardrobe, laying a lawn and constructing an ornamental wall and a side wall in the garden. By virtue of these efforts the husband sought a beneficial interest in the proceeds of sale of the property.

== Judgment ==
In the course of his judgment, Lord Diplock said,

"It would, in my view, be an abuse of the legal technique for ascertaining or imputing intention to apply to transactions between the post-war generation of married couples "presumptions which are based upon inferences of fact which an earlier generation of judges drew as to the most likely intentions of earlier generations of spouses belonging to the propertied classes of a different social era."

== See also ==
- English trusts law
