= Attorney General James =

Attorney General James may refer to:

- Henry James, 1st Baron James of Hereford (1828–1911), Attorney General for England and Wales
- Hugo James (died 1835), Attorney General of Jamaica
- Letitia James (born 1958), Attorney General of New York
- Walter James (Australian politician) (1863–1943), Attorney General of Western Australia

== See also ==
- General James (disambiguation)
