= Arthur Werner Lewey =

Sir Arthur Werner Lewey (2 September 1894 – 26 October 1973) was a British colonial lawyer and judge.

Educated at St Paul's School and Trinity Hall, Cambridge, Lewey served in the Middlesex Regiment during the First World War, before being called to the bar at the Inner Temple in 1920.

He entered the Colonial Service in 1929, was police magistrate in the Gambia from 1930, crown counsel in Kenya from 1932, Solicitor-General of Uganda from 1936, Attorney-General of Jamaica from 1939, Attorney-General of the Gold Coast from 1943 to 1948. He was legal adviser to Viscount Swinton, minister resident in West Africa from 1944 and legal adviser to the West African Council from 1946.

He was appointed a Justice of Appeal of the West African Court of Appeal in 1948, serving until 1951. In 1952, he was appointed a Justice of Appeal of the Rhodesia and Nyasaland Court of Appeal. He was Chief Justice of Northern Rhodesia from 1952 until 1955. He became one of the first three justices of the Supreme Court of the Federation of Rhodesia and Nyasaland in 1955, and retired in 1958.
