= General James =

General James may refer to:

- Amaziah B. James (1812–1883), New York State Militia major general
- Daniel James Jr. (1920–1978), U.S. Air Force general
- Frank B. James (1912–2004), U.S. Air Force brigadier general
- Henry James (British Army officer) (1803–1877), British Army lieutenant general
- Larry D. James (born 1956), U.S. Air Force lieutenant general
- Thomas S. James Jr. (born 1963), U.S. Army lieutenant general
- Thomas L. James (fl. 1990s–2020s), U.S. Army brigadier general
- William James (general) (1930–2015), Australian Army major general
- William C. James (1896–1974), U.S. Marine Corps brigadier general

== See also ==
- Attorney General James (disambiguation)
