= Ransford Braham =

Jamaican politician

The Honourable Senator Ransford Braham KC

Member of the Senate of Jamaica
- In office 2016–2025

Attorney General of Jamaica
- In office July 2011 – December 2011
- Preceded by: Dorothy Lightbourne
- Succeeded by: Patrick Atkinson

Personal details
- Citizenship: Jamaica
- Other political affiliations: People's National Party
- Education: Kingston College
- Occupation: Senator
- Profession: Attorney

Ransford Braham KC is a Jamaican politician from the Labour Party, who currently serves as a member of the Senate of Jamaica.

Braham graduated from the University of the West Indies. He served as Attorney General under Bruce Golding from 2011 to 2012.
