= Car and Universal Finance Co Ltd v Caldwell =

English contract law case

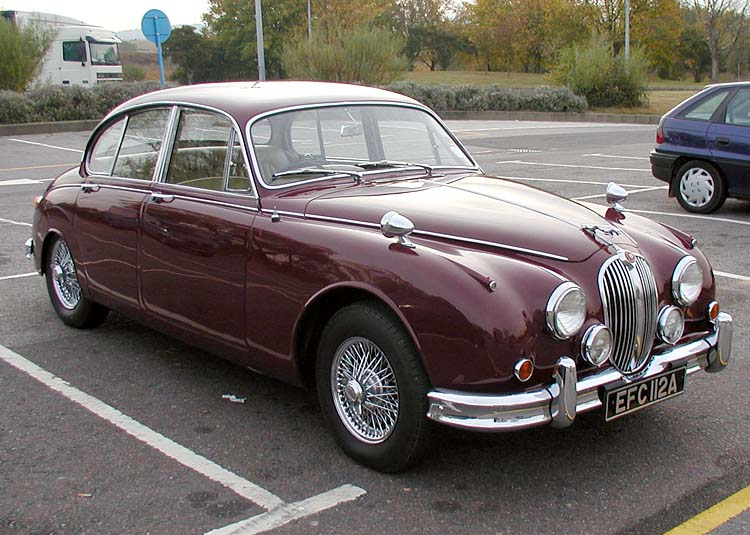
- Court: Court of Appeal
- Citation: [1965] 1 QB 525

Car and Universal Finance Co Ltd v Caldwell [1965] 1 QB 525 is an English contract law case concerning misrepresentation. It holds that an unequivocal act communicating the wish to rescind a contract can override third party rights. The communication does not need to go to the misrepresentor.

== Facts ==
Mr Caldwell owned a Jaguar. A rogue named 'Mr Norris' convinced him to sell it for a £965 cheque and a £10 deposit. On 13 January when he tried to cash the cheque it was dishonoured. Mr Caldwell told the police and the Automobile Association straight away. Mr Norris sold the car to some dealers, who sold it on, and it was sold on again and again to Car and Universal Finance Ltd. They bought the car in good faith without any notice. The question was whether Caldwell had validly rescinded before the car was acquired by a bona fide purchaser for value without notice.

== Judgment ==
=== High Court ===
Lord Denning MR (sitting in the Queen's Bench) said the contract was validly rescinded. It was so without communication, but through an unequivocal act of election, demonstrating Caldwell no longer wished to be bound.

=== Court of Appeal ===
Sellers LJ, on appeal said the ‘general rule, no doubt, is that where a party is entitled to rescind a contract and wishes to do so the contract subsists until the opposing party is informed that the contract has been rescinded. He noted that just because, ‘another innocent party or parties may suffer does not in my view of the matter justify imposing on a defrauded seller an impossible task.’

Upjohn LJ said if a party absconds and makes communication of rescission impossible, he cannot insist on his right to be made aware. ‘I think that the law must allow the innocent party to exercise his right of rescission otherwise than by communication or repossession.’

Davies LJ noted the old maxim lex non cogit ad impossibilia (the law does not compel the impossible).

== See also ==
- English contract law
- Misrepresentation in English law
