= Derrick McKoy =

Attorney General of Jamaica

The Honourable Derrick McKoy CD KC JP
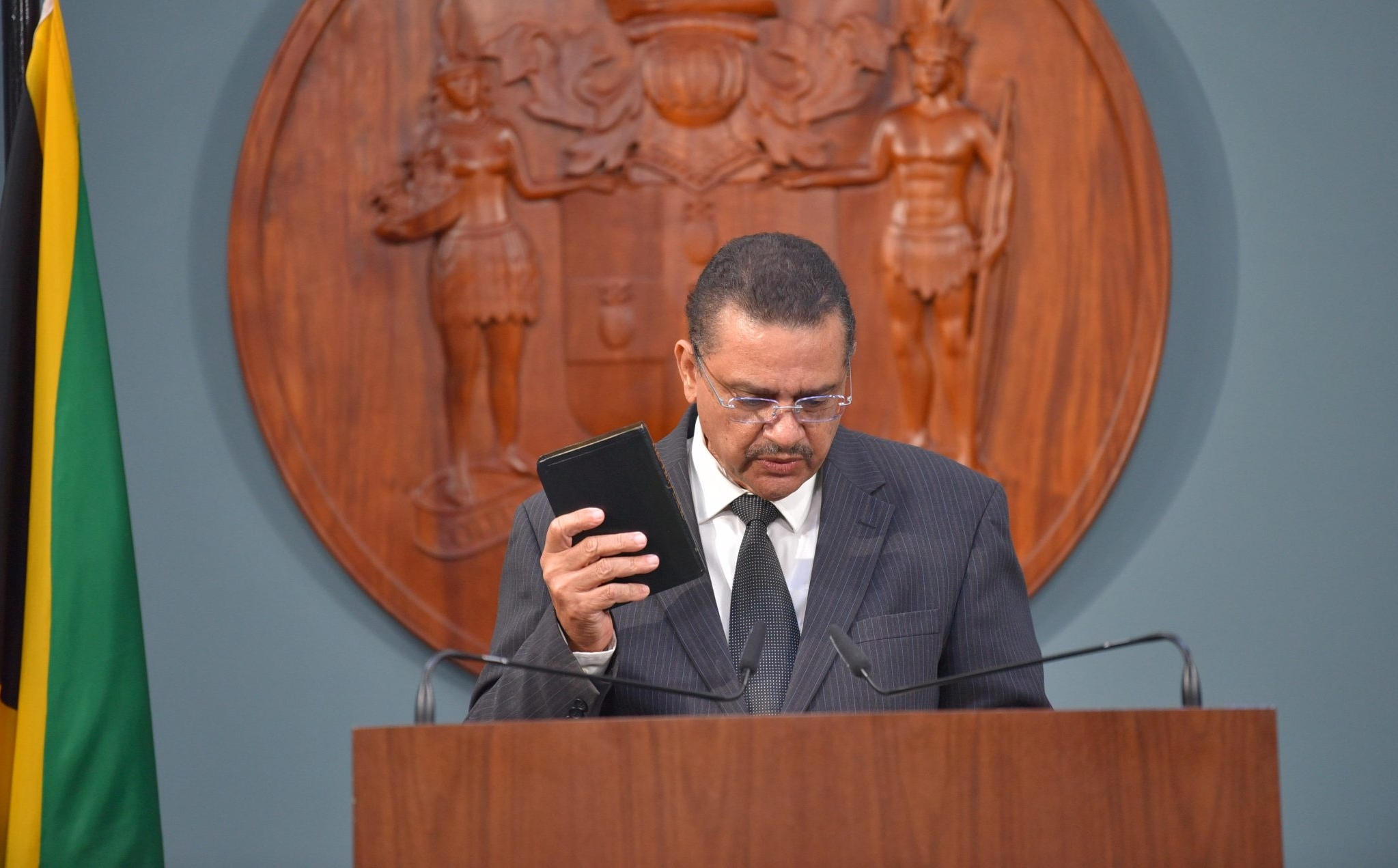

Attorney General of Jamaica
- Incumbent
- Assumed office 11 January 2022
- Prime Minister: Andrew Holness
- Preceded by: Marlene Malahoo Forte

Personal details
- Born: 3 October 1951 (age 75)
- Education: University of Leicester Nova Southeastern University Barry University University of the West Indies

Derrick Vincent McKoy (born 3 October 1951) is the Attorney General of Jamaica. McKoy was appointed to the post on 11 January 2022 by Prime Minister Andrew Holness.

McKoy was previously a commissioner of Jamaica's anti-corruption body the Integrity Commission until he resigned in January 2020. He also has served as contractor general for Jamaica. He was a founding member of the Jamaica Chapter of Transparency International (TI), a member of the executive committee and its first secretary.

He has lectured at the Mona School of Business, the University of International Relations, the Norman Manley Law School, Barry University’s Andreas School of Business, and Nova Southeastern University’s Huizenga School of Business. He has also published in the areas of competition law, constitutional law, corruption, labour law, public management, governance, and the law of computers. He was made Queen's Counsel (QC) in May 2022.

== Education ==
McKoy received his MBA from Barry University and Bachelor of Laws from the University of the West Indies. He received his doctorate in law from the University of Leicester and in Business Administration from Nova Southeastern University. He also obtained a Master of Laws in International and Comparative Law from University College London.

== Award ==
- Order of Distinction (2016)
