= Dorothy Lightbourne =

Jamaican politician

The Honourable Dorothy Lightbourne CD KC

Minister of Justice
- In office September 2007 – July 2011
- Prime Minister: Bruce Golding
- Preceded by: Sen. A. J. Nicholson
- Succeeded by: Delroy Chuck

Attorney General of Jamaica
- In office September 2007 – July 2011
- Prime Minister: Bruce Golding
- Preceded by: Sen. A. J. Nicholson
- Succeeded by: Ransford Braham

Personal details
- Born: 1938 (age 87–88) Aeolus Valley, Saint Thomas, Colony of Jamaica, British Empire
- Party: Jamaica Labour Party (1984–2011)
- Education: Hull University
- Profession: Lawyer

Dorothy Lightbourne is a former politician who served as Minister of Justice and the Attorney General of Jamaica from September 2007 to July 2011. She also served as the Leader of Government Business or Majority Leader of the Senate from September 2007 to July 2011.

She was born in Aeolus Valley, St Thomas, and raised as an Anglican. She attended Addey and Stanhope School and Hull University. She is a member of the Jamaica Labour Party. She was a Senator in 1984–1989 and was Deputy President of the Senate.

Senator Lightbourne has received criticism for her approach to the Manatt, Phelps & Phillips/Christopher 'Dudus' Coke extradition. She has also received public criticism for allegedly lying in the Commission of Enquiry as it relates to the Manatt/Dudus scandal and her rocky relationship with Senator K. D. Knight.

She was removed by Prime Minister Bruce Golding and replaced by Delroy Chuck as Minister of Justice and by Ransford Braham as Attorney General. Following her dismissal, she maintains a private life. The roles of Minister of Justice and Attorney General, normally held by the same person, were subsequently split.

She is a Commander of the Order of Distinction (CD) and a member of the King's Counsel (KC).

== See also ==
- Women in the House of Representatives of Jamaica
