= Tony Vandervell =

British industrialist (1898–1967)

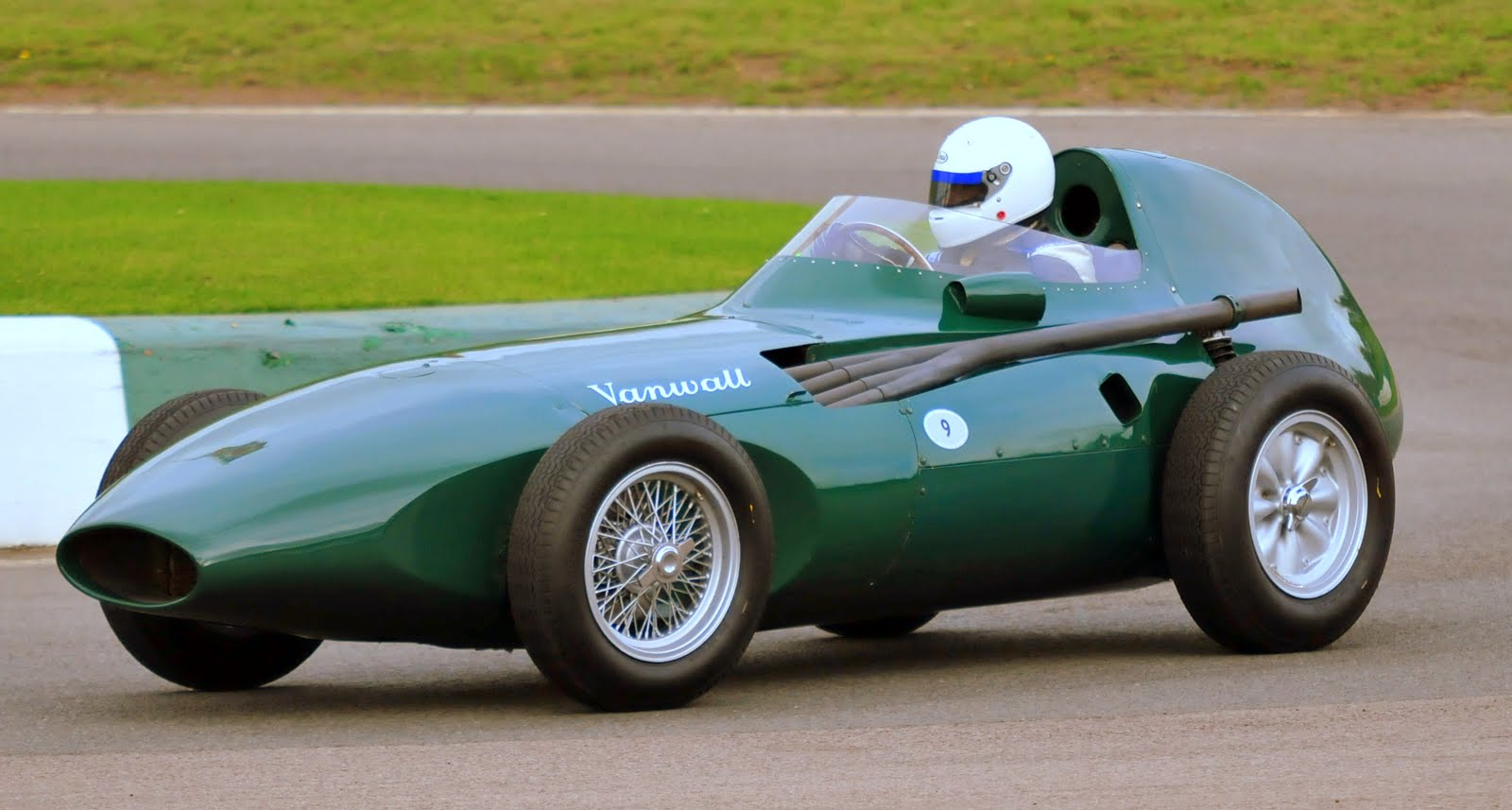
1958 Vanwall Formula One car

Guy Anthony "Tony" Vandervell (8 September 1898 – 10 March 1967) was a British industrialist, motor racing financier, and founder of the Vanwall Formula One racing team.

== Motorsport ==
Vandervell was the son of Charles Vandervell, founder of CAV, later Lucas CAV. He made his fortune from the production of Babbitt Thin-Wall bearings by his company Vandervell Products, under licence from the American Cleveland Graphite Bronze Company. W. A. Robotham first met him about 1934 when Rolls-Royce was having bearing problems on Bentleys. He said that Tony came across publicly as a "tough nut ... spoiling for a fight" and his marital problems attracted publicity, but he was a true friend who would always come to the aid of staff as well as a successful industrialist of the sort that Britain could use more of. However he seemed to have a "persecution complex" and fell out with some friends.

Having raced both motorcycles and cars a number of times in his younger days, soon after the end of World War II he acquired a Ferrari 125, powered by a 1.5-litre Colombo engine, which was altered by his mechanics and competed as the Thinwall Special, reflecting Vandervell's business empire. This was initially intended to be run as an evaluation of the Thinwall bearing, to be used as a research exercise by British Racing Motors (BRM). To that end, the car was a success, and Vandervell even provided a detailed critique of the car's flaws back to Enzo Ferrari himself.

Between 1949 and 1953, there were four different Thinwall Specials. Though one of the first financial backers of BRM, Vandervell rapidly became disenchanted at the way in which Raymond Mays was running the team and in 1951, after the second Ferrari-based Thinwall Special had been evaluated, he decided to go his own way. He started to build a team, based in his Acton factory, that would be capable of designing and running its own 2.5L Formula One entry in 1954. Vandervell was nothing if not ambitious and brought in both Norton (of which he was a director) and Rolls-Royce as engine consultants. In the intervening years two more Ferraris found themselves transformed into Thinwall machines, often acting as rolling test-beds for innovative components such as Dunlop disc brakes.

On completion of the engine, it was decided to run it in a chassis commissioned from the Cooper Car Company. Designed by Owen Maddock, the chassis was delivered to Vandervell in early 1954. This car – the Vanwall Special, a portmanteau of Vandervell's and his product's names – was entered into the non-championship International Trophy race on 15 May. It wasn't until July that the car had its first World Championship outing in the 1954 British Grand Prix, driven by Peter Collins, where it failed to finish. The car competed in two further races that season, finishing 7th in Italy, but Collins crashed into a tree in practice for the season-closing Spanish Grand Prix. Vandervell reinforced his renamed Vanwall team for 1955, bringing in Mike Hawthorn and Ken Wharton as drivers, but only scored minor victories in the two newly constructed machines.

In 1956 Vandervell drafted in Colin Chapman, Frank Costin and Harry Weslake on the engineering side. Even over the brief duration of his involvement with the sport, it was this ability to spot new talent that marked Vandervell out as one of the most successful and influential F1 team owners. The 1956 car, built fully in-house, took Vanwall's first major victory in the International Trophy early in the year, in the hands of Stirling Moss. Unfortunately, the rest of the season failed to live up to this early promise. Moss was joined by Tony Brooks for the 1957 Formula One season, and the pair shared Vanwall's first World Championship victory in the 1957 British Grand Prix. Moss took two further victories that season, laying a foundation for the team's zenith year: 1958.

The Vanwall team won six of the 1958 Formula One season's eleven races, Moss and Brooks sharing equally with three apiece. Good driving by the whole team, including third driver Stuart Lewis-Evans, won Vanwall the Constructors' Championship, beating BRM to this milestone by four years; a vindication of Vandervell's decision to split with Raymond Mays's organisation. However, this even spread of points among the team allowed Hawthorn, by then in a Ferrari, to snatch the Drivers' Championship from Moss by just 1 point. The achievement was clouded by the death of Stuart Lewis-Evans from burns sustained in an accident at the Moroccan Grand Prix.

Increasing age and the strains of running a high-profile sporting team had taken its toll on Tony Vandervell's health. Vandervell had been deeply affected by Lewis-Evans's death, and in January 1959 he announced that he would not be continuing with the team. The loss of Vandervell's drive, ambition and money crippled Vanwall, and the team never again won a World Championship race. Vanwall struggled on with a new car in 1959. The same vehicle was run occasionally in non-championship events in 1960, but after 1961 when Lotus experimented with a Vanwall engine in one of their chassis, the Vanwall name disappeared from F1. The last Vanwall car was built to Intercontinental Formula rules for John Surtees in 1962. This series was unsuccessful and Vanwall folded for good, fewer than four years after their world domination.

Tony Vandervell withdrew from public life after leaving Vanwall. He died in March 1967. Just seven weeks earlier he had married his personal secretary, Marian Moore.

== Tax avoidance ==
Vandervell donated a large sum of money to the Royal College of Surgeons (RCS) to establish a chair. He implemented a complex tax avoidance scheme. He instructed a bank, orally, to transfer complete ownership of 100,000 A-shares in his company, Vandervell Products, which they held on bare trust for him to the RCS and asked the RCS to grant an option simultaneously to purchase the shares to his trust company, Vandervell Trustees. He then instructed the VP to declare a dividend on the shares. The purpose of this was to avoid paying stamp duty by a written declaration of disposition of equitable ownership, and to avoid any liability for Vandervell to pay surtax on the dividends since the RCS was a charity and thus not liable to pay tax. This led to a leading case in English trusts law, Vandervell v Inland Revenue Commissioners [1967] 2 AC 291.

Unfortunately for Vandervell, his tax avoidance scheme was not successful. In respect of the shares, the Inland Revenue Commissioners (IRC) argued that Vandervell retained an equitable interest (in the shares) and as such, he was liable to pay tax on the value of those shares. This is because, they argued, his oral instruction to the trust company was not capable of transfer of the equitable interest, since it did not comply with the formality requirements specified in s53(1)c of the Law of Property Act 1925, requiring signed writing to evidence the existence of a disposition. The House of Lords held that s53(1)c was not applicable to situations where a beneficiary directs his trustees, by way of his Saunders v Vautier right to do so, to transfer full (legal and equitable: note Lord Browne-Wilkinson's rejection of such terminology in Westdeutsche Landesbank Gironzentralle v Islington LBC) ownership to someone else. As such, Vandervell had successfully divested himself of ownership (legal and equitable) in the shares, notwithstanding that he did so by means of an oral instruction. He was thus not liable to pay tax on the shares.

However, Vandervell was not so fortunate in respect of the option to purchase. The option to purchase a substantial fraction of the company for only £5,000 was extremely valuable. As such, Vandervell, if he retained an interest in it, would have to pay considerable surtax on it. The House of Lords held, by a 3–2 majority, that whilst the trust company had the legal title to the option, Vandervell had not successfully divested himself of an equitable interest in the option. As such, the option was held on a resulting trust for Vandervell. It was held that a resulting trust would arise where equitable interest had not successfully been divested, because an equitable interest cannot merely hang, unattached to an owner. As such, Vandervell was liable to pay surtax on the option.

In a second case, Re Vandervell's Trusts [1974] Ch 269, Vandervell again attempted a tax avoidance scheme in relation to the same shares and the same option. He instructed the tax company to repurchase the shares through the option. Vandervell did not want to pay tax on the option or the shares (the trust of which he would be an object, the trustee being his trust company). The purchase money came from a trust, held by the same trust company but in favour of Vandervell's children. As such, the trust company took themselves as holding the purchased shares on trust for the children. The Court of Appeal of England and Wales held that the option ceased to exist once it was exercised. Thus, there was no disposition and no consequent liability to pay tax. It also held that the children were the equitable owners of the shares, and, as such, Vandervell had divested himself of equitable ownership of the shares.

== See also ==
- English trusts law
