= Hard cases make bad law =

Adage or legal maxim

Hard cases make bad law is an adage or legal maxim meaning that an extreme case is a poor basis for a general law that would cover a wider range of less extreme cases. In other words, a general law is better drafted for the average circumstance as this will be more common.

The original meaning of the phrase concerned cases in which the law had a hard impact on some person whose situation aroused sympathy.

The expression dates at least to 1837. It was used in 1904 by US Supreme Court Justice Oliver Wendell Holmes Jr. Its validity has since been questioned and dissenting variations include the phrase "Bad law makes hard cases", and even its opposite, "Hard cases make good law".

== Discussion ==
The maxim dates at least to 1837, when a judge, ruling in favor of a parent against the maintenance of her children, said, "We have heard that hard cases make bad law." The judge's wording suggests that the phrase was not new then.

Oliver Wendell Holmes Jr. made a utilitarian argument for this in his judgment of Northern Securities Co. v. United States (1904):

Great cases like hard cases make bad law. For great cases are called great, not by reason of their importance ... but because of some accident of immediate overwhelming interest which appeals to the feelings and distorts the judgment.

Holmes's dissenting opinion in the case, which applied the Sherman Antitrust Act to the securities company, has been described as a reaction to President Theodore Roosevelt's wish to dramatize the issues of monopolies and trusts.

The legal scholar Glanville Williams questioned the adage's usage in 1957, writing, "It used to be said that 'hard cases make bad law'—a proposition that our less pedantic age regards as doubtful. What is certain is that cases in which the moral indignation of the judge is aroused frequently make bad law." Bryan A. Garner calls the phrase a cliche; while mentioning Williams's disparagement, he asserts that it remains in frequent use, "sometimes unmeaningfully".

In Re Vandervell's Trusts (No 2), Lord Denning stated the following, after one of the barristers in the case had asserted that the issues should be resolved in his client's favour, given that "hard cases make bad law":

Mr. Balcombe realised that the claim of the executors here had no merit whatsoever. He started off by reminding us that "hard cases make bad law." He repeated it time after time. He treated it as if it was an ultimate truth. But it is a maxim which is quite misleading. It should be deleted from our vocabulary. It comes to this: "Unjust decisions make good law": whereas they do nothing of the kind. Every unjust decision is a reproach to the law or to the judge who administers it. If the law should be in danger of doing injustice, then equity should be called in to remedy it. Equity was introduced to mitigate the rigour of the law. But in the present case it has been prayed in aid to do injustice on a large scale—to defeat the intentions of a dead man—to deprive his children of the benefits he provided for them—and to expose his estate to the payment of tax of over £600,000. I am glad to find that we can overcome this most unjust result.

== Bad law makes hard cases ==
The adage's converse, "bad law makes hard cases", has also been used.

In his discussion of the converse, the jurist John Chipman Gray saw legal professionals as subject to the temptation of valuing the "logical coherency of the system itself" over the well-being of individuals. A more recent discussion of the adage and its converse sees cases that have received special attention as the recipient of more care.

== Hard cases make good law ==
The legal scholar Arthur Linton Corbin, writing in 1923, reversed the adage in an article entitled "Hard Cases Make Good Law":

When a stated rule of law works injustice in a particular case; that is, would determine it contrary to 'the settled convictions of the community,' the rule is pretty certain either to be denied outright or to be undermined by a fiction or a specious distinction. It is said that 'hard cases make bad law;' but it can be said with at least as much truth that hard cases make good law.

== See also ==
- Exception that proves the rule
- Special pleading
