= Hugo James =

Jamaican planter and politician

Hugo James (died 1835) was a planter in Jamaica, the owner of Mount Moreland estate. He was elected to the House of Assembly of Jamaica in 1820. In 1829 he was appointed Attorney General of Jamaica.
