= Tribe v Tribe =

English trusts law case, concerning resulting trusts

- Court: Court of Appeal
- Citations: [1995] EWCA Civ 20, [1996] Ch 107

Keywords
- Illegality, presumption, shares

Tribe v Tribe [1995] EWCA 20 is an English trusts law case, concerning resulting trusts, the presumption of advancement and illegality.

== Facts ==
A father transferred company shares to his son (presumption of advancement) to preserve them for the family’s benefit because he could be soon liable for dilapidations under commercial leases. It turned out he was not liable. The son refused to re-transfer shares.

== Judgment ==
The Court of Appeal held that the father could demand return of the shares, because his illegal scheme had not in fact been carried into effect. Millett LJ said it was true that an illegal purpose cannot rebut the presumption of advancement, but because the illegal purpose had not been carried out, the father was not precluded of pleading the purpose to claim a resulting trust.

== See also ==
- English trusts law
