= Attorney General of Jamaica =

Attorney General of Jamaica is the chief law officer in Jamaica.

Section 79(1) of the Constitution of Jamaica states that "there shall be an Attorney General who shall be the principal legal adviser to the Government of Jamaica" and pursuant to the Crown Proceedings Act all civil proceedings by or against the Government are instituted in the name of the Attorney General.

== List of attorneys general of Jamaica ==
Main Source:

=== 1655 English/British Colony ===
- Edmund Ducke 1671
- John Wright 1685
- Sir Richard Dereham 1688
- Simon Musgrave 1686–1691
- William Brodrick (politician), brother of Alan Brodrick, 1st Viscount Midleton, (Lord Chancellor of Ireland) 1693
- Thomas Barrow 1698
- Edward Haskins 1703
- Robert Hotchkyn 1707
- William Brodrick 1711–1715
- Edmund Kelly 1719
- William Monk 1724
- Alexander Henderson 1732
- Thomas Howe 1732
- Matthew Concanen 1732–1744
- Andrew Arcedeckne 1734
- Thomas Hill 1744
- Robert Penny 1744–1749
- Henry Morgan Byndloss 1754
- Richard Beckford 1755
- Gilbert Ford 1760
- Edward Penny 1760
- Thomas Gordon 1766
- Thomas Beach 1766
- Thomas Harrison 1769
- Robert Sewell, 1784
- George Crawford Ricketts 1796
- William Ross 1802
- Thomas Witter Jackson 1808-1818
- William Burge 1818–1829
- Hugo James 1829
- Fitzherbert Batty 1832
- Dowell O'Reilly 1833–1855
- Alexander Heslop 1857–1866 (1855–?)
- 1866 British Crown Colony
- Ernest Alexander Clendinning Schalch 1872 (died 1874)
- George Hurley Barne 1874–1876
- (Sir) Edward Loughlin O'Malley 1876–1879
- Sir Henry Hicks Hocking 1880–c.1895
  - Thomas Bancroft Oughton, acting, 1889–
- (Sir) Henry Rawlins Pipon Schooles 1896–1905
- Thomas Bancroft Oughton 1906–
- Ernest St. John Branch 1910–
- Frederick Chester Wells Durrant 1921–1932
- Maurice Vivian Camacho (c. 1931–1938)
- Arthur Werner Lewey 1939–
- Thomas Henry Mayers c.1944
- Joseph Leslie Cundall 1952–?1962

=== 1962 Independent Commonwealth realm ===
- Victor B. Grant, 1962–1972
- Leacroft Robinson, 1972–1976
- Raphael Carl Rattray, 1976–1980
- Winston Spaulding, 1980–1986
- Oswald Harding, 1986–1989
- Raphael Carl Rattray, 1989–1993
- David Coore, 1993–1995
- Arnold Joseph Nicholson, 1995–2007
- Dorothy Lightbourne, 2007–2011
- Ransford Braham, 2011–2012
- Patrick Atkinson, 2012–2016
- Marlene Malahoo Forte, 2016-2022
- Derrick McKoy, 2022–present
