= Fowkes v Pascoe =

English law case

- Court: Court of Appeal
- Citation: (1875) LR 10 Ch App 343

Keywords
- Resulting trusts

Fowkes v Pascoe (1875) LR 10 Ch App 343 is an English trusts law case, concerning the circumstances when a resulting trust arises.

== Facts ==
Mrs Baker bought two sums of stock. One was put in the names of herself and a young lodger called Mr Pascoe, who she treated like a grandson. The other was in her and her friend's name. It was argued by the executor, Fowkes, that when Mrs Baker died Pascoe held the stock on resulting trust.

== Judgment ==
James LJ held that although a presumption of a resulting trust applied, it was rebutted on the facts, because plainly Mrs Baker intended to make a gift to Mr Pascoe.

the evidence in favour of a gift and against trust is absolutely conclusive… The lady had £500 to invest; she had already large sums of stock standing in her own name, besides other considerable property. Is it possible to reconcile with mental sanity the theory that she put £250 into the names of herself and her companion, and £250 into the names of herself and [Pascoe], as trustees upon trust for herself? What trust - what object is there conceivable in doing this?

== See also ==
- English trust law
