= Gerald Upjohn, Baron Upjohn =

British soldier and judge

The Right Honourable The Lord Upjohn CBE, PC, DL
- Portrait by Walter Stoneman, 1955

Lord of Appeal in Ordinary
- In office 26 November 1963 – 27 January 1971

Lord Justice of Appeal
- In office 1960–1963

Justice of the High Court
- In office 1951–1960

Personal details
- Born: Gerald Ritchie Upjohn; 25 February 1903 Wimbledon, Surrey, England
- Died: 27 January 1971 (aged 67) London, England

Gerald Ritchie Upjohn, Baron Upjohn, CBE, PC, DL (25 February 1903 – 27 January 1971) was a British soldier and judge.

== Biography ==
The younger son of William Henry Upjohn KC, he served in the Welsh Guards during the Second World War, reaching the rank of brigadier. In 1948, he sat with Sir George Lynskey and Sir Godfrey Vick on the Lynskey tribunal. Appointed to the Privy Council in 1960, he was Lord Justice of Appeal from 1960 to 1963. On 26 November 1963 he became a Lord of Appeal in Ordinary and was made additionally a life peer by the style title Baron Upjohn, of Little Tey in the County of Essex.

While a Lord of Appeal in Ordinary he contributed to a number of significant cases. Three cases of particular importance are Boardman v Phipps [1967] 2 AC 46 (giving a powerful dissent), Vandervell v IRC [1967] 2 AC 291 (where he gave a majority speech) and In re Gulbenkian's Settlements [1970] AC 508.

An interesting problem arose on Lord Upjohn's death. The Judicial Committee of the House of Lords would ideally sit with an odd number of judges, to ensure a clear decision. Lord Upjohn's death raised the problem of an equally divided Appellate Committee. Kennedy v Spratt [1972] AC 83 remained on the docket and Lord Upjohn had already prepared a speech, intending to vote with Lord Reid and Lord Diplock, dismissing the appeal. Lord Reid read Lord Upjohn's speech as a part of his own and in accordance with the presumption in favour of the status quo (semper pracsumitur pro negante), the appeal was dismissed. It has been pointed out that, 'had Lord Upjohn been in favour of allowing the appeal, the application of the principle would have produced a disgruntled appellant whose victory had been snatched from under his nose: it may well be that such manifest injustice would have led to the case being reargued before a reconstituted court.'

== Notable cases ==
=== As Counsel ===
- Eaves v. Eaves [1939] Ch. 1000
- Re Diplock [1948] Ch. 465
- Ministry of Health v Simpson [1951] A.C. 251

=== As Upjohn J ===
- Copeland v Greenhalf [1952] Ch 488
- Thompson (WL) Ltd v Robinson (Gunmakers) Ltd, [1955] Ch 177
- Merricks v. Heathcote Amory [1955] Ch. 567
- Halsall v Brizell [1957] Ch 169

=== In the Court of Appeal ===
- Hong Kong Fir v Kawasaki [1962] 2 QB 26;
- In Re Pauling's Settlement Trusts [1964] Ch. 303
- Car and Universal Finance Co Ltd v Caldwell [1965] 1 QB 525
- Boulting v Association of Cinematograph, Television and Allied Technicians [1963] 2 QB 606

=== In the Privy Council ===
- Paradise Beach and Transportation Co Ltd v Price-Robinson [1968] AC 1072

=== In the House of Lords ===
- Practice Statement (Judicial Precedent) [1966] 1 WLR 1234
- Suisse Atlantique Societe d'Armament SA v NV Rotterdamsche Kolen Centrale [1967] 1 A.C. 361
- Boardman v Phipps [1967] 2 AC 46
- Vandervell v IRC [1967] 2 AC 291
- Beswick v Beswick [1968] AC 58
- C Czarnikow Ltd v Koufos or The Heron II [1969] 1 AC 350
- In re Gulbenkian's Settlements [1970] AC 508
- Pettitt v. Pettitt [1970] A.C. 777
- Redland Bricks Ltd. v. Morris [1970] A.C. 652
- Bushell v Faith [1970] AC 1099

== Arms ==
Coat of arms of Gerald Upjohn, Baron Upjohn
Crest A Stork proper holding in the beak a Balance Or Escutcheon Sable a Fess between in chief two Lion's Heads erased and in base as many Leeks in saltire Or Motto Quid quid agis age toto
