= Beneficial interest =

A beneficial interest is the right that a person has arising from a contract to which they are not a party, or a trust. For example, if A makes a contract with B that A will pay C a certain sum of money, B has the legal interest in the contract, and C the beneficial interest.

More generally, a beneficial interest is any "interest of value, worth, or use in property one does not own", for example, "the interest that a beneficiary of a trust has in the trust". More specifically, it could be:

- "A property interest that inures solely to the benefit of the owner", or
- Property that "remains of an estate after the payment of debts and the expenses of administration", or
- The right of a person having a power of appointment to appoint himself".

Black's Law Dictionary defines beneficial interest as "Profit, benefit or advantage resulting from a contract, or the ownership of an estate as distinct from the legal ownership or control." Examples of beneficial interests in mining claims include unrecorded deeds and agreements to share profits, but not mortgages and other liens. A beneficial interest is also "distinguished from the rights of someone like a trustee or official who has responsibility to perform and/or title to the assets but does not share in the benefits".

== See also ==
- Asset protection
- Beneficial owner
- Beneficial use
- Corporate benefit
- Lien
- Purpose trust
- Quistclose trust
- Resulting trust
- Use (law)
- Third-party beneficiary
- Trust (law)
