= Presumption of advancement =

Legal presumption

The presumption of advancement is a legal presumption which arises in various common law jurisdictions in relation to the transfers of money or other property. Broadly, the presumption states that where a husband transfers property to his wife, or a father to his child or someone to whom he has assumed parental responsibility, then in the absence of other evidence the court will presume that the transfer was by way of gift. In Australia it has also been held to apply to transfers from a male fiancé to a female fiancée. In Hong Kong it has been suggested that it may also apply to an official concubine.

In all other circumstances the transfer is presumed to be by way of loan (in the case of money) or subject to a presumed resulting trust in the case of other property. Sometimes, less commonly, the presumption is referred to in the reverse, in that all other transfers are said to be subject to a presumption of loan.

The presumption has been subjected to criticism on the basis that it reflects outdated Victorian era social values, i.e. a transfer from a father or a husband is to be presumed to be a gift, but not a transfer from a wife or a mother (although in Australia it has been recognised in Brown v Brown that a wife can transfer property to her husband). Others have questioned whether the presumption has any significant effect in practice. Some academics have even questioned whether it is accurate to say that there is presumption of advancement at all. There is no presumption of advancement between cohabiting couples (whether heterosexual or homosexual), nor between a man and his mistress.

The presumption is rebuttable by evidence. In Pettitt v Pettitt [1970] AC 777 Lord Hodson indicated that the weight to be accorded to the presumption is very slight, and that it might be rebutted by the slightest of evidence. It has also been referred to as a "judicial instrument of the last resort". But in the absence of any other evidence the presumption will still apply.

The earliest known case where the presumption has been cited dates from 1677.

In the Hong Kong case of Suen Shu Tai v Tam Fung Tai [2014] HKEC 1125 the Court of Appeal of Hong Kong, in obiter dicta, preferred the modern approach in that the presumption of advancement applies equally where a mother transfers property to her child. However, it left open the question of whether the presumption applies where a mother transfers property to an adult independent child.

== Abolition ==
In New Zealand the presumption has been abolished between husbands and wives.

In Canada the Supreme Court has held that it does not apply to gifts from a parent to an adult child, though noting that where the presumption does apply—for example, in respect of gifts to minor children—it should apply equally to mothers and fathers.

In the United Kingdom provision was made to abolish the presumption in section 199 of Equality Act 2010, but to date, that section has not been brought into force. A previous attempt to abolish the presumption as between husband and wife by way of a private member's bill entitled the Family Law (Property and Maintenance) Bill failed to reach a second reading in 2006.
