= Resulting trust =

Type of legal trust

A resulting trust is an implied trust that comes into existence by operation of law, where property is transferred to a volunteer (i.e. someone who does not give consideration) and then is implied to hold the property for the benefit of another person.

The trust property is said to "result" or revert to the transferor (as an implied settlor). This use of "result" means spring back. Although the volunteer may be the legal owner of the property, they are not permitted to benefit from it, with beneficial ownership being retained by the transferor. Where the transferor has died, the beneficial interest results to their estate.

The courts have implied the existence of resulting trusts in a number of situations. For example, a "presumptive" resulting trust can arise where an apparent gift (i.e. a transfer of an asset made without adequate consideration) has been made, such that it is presumed that the transferor did not actually intend to make a gift and that the asset must result to the transferor. Depending on jurisdiction, the presumption may also be inapplicable in transfers between spouses.

== Resulting trusts in English law ==
An attempt to classify resulting trusts was made by Megarry J in Re Vandervell's Trusts (No. 2) [1974] Ch 269. According to Megarry J, there are two sorts of resulting trusts in English law.

=== Presumptive Resulting Trusts ===
These trusts arise when A transfers property to B, and the law creates a rebuttable presumption of a resulting trust if A's intention is unclear (absence of written evidence).

For instance, if A transfers property to B, except when the transfer is between parents and children or spouses, the law presumes a resulting trust for A in the absence of evidence to the contrary (unless A provides evidence that the property is actually owned by B).

The main categories of fact situations giving rise to a presumption of a resulting trust are: A voluntary conveyance of property by A to B. A monetary contribution by A to purchase property for B (The Venture, [1908] P 218, (1907) 77 L.J.P. 105.)

These presumptions are rebuttable. In Fowkes v Pascoe, evidence was presented that a woman had purchased stock in the names of herself and her grandson; the grandson and granddaughter-in-law's evidence that this was a gift was admissible. However, the presumption only considers an intention to create a trust, not ulterior motives. Tinsley v Milligan exemplifies this, where fraudulent intent didn't defeat the presumption of a resulting trust.

=== Automatic Resulting Trusts ===
These trusts take effect by operation of law and are automatic. They can arise when a settlor sets up a trust for a third party, but there's an initial failure due to the lack of defined beneficiaries or changing objectives.

For example, when the settlor names beneficiaries who can't be defined, as in Morice v Bishop of Durham, or when trust objectives become impossible or irrelevant by the time of the transfer, as in Re Gillingham Bus Disaster Fund.

Some academics suggest automatic resulting trusts arise only when a property has been transferred to a trustee on an express trust, where the trustee has legal title to the property, to be held on trust for the settlor.

==== Settlor's Intention in Automatic Resulting Trusts ====
In relation to automatic resulting trusts, there's some difference in expressing the nature of the settlor's intention. According to Westdeutsche, Lord Browne-Wilkinson stated that a resulting trust arises due to a legal "presumed intention to create a trust in favor of the settlor". It is also suggested that the trust arises from a "lack of intention to benefit the recipient". This could be referred to as the Chambers Model of intention, where the settlor intends to retain the beneficial interest in the property but transfers the legal title.

Differentiating between a positive intention to retain beneficial interest and a lack of intention to benefit the transferee is significant. It's often harder to prove intention than to establish the circumstances for a legal presumption. Rebutting a presumption might be easier than disproving intention.

== Voluntary transfer of land ==
Despite the general presumption of resulting trust, this doesn't apply to voluntary transfers of land due to the Law of Property Act 1925 s.60(3). However, the court can still consider extrinsic evidence to establish the creation of a trust.

== Resulting Trusts in South Africa ==
In South Africa, there's no doctrine of resulting trusts. The main remedy, if any trust purposes fail, would be as an unjust enrichment, as seen in Westdeutsche Landesbank v Council of London Borough of Islington.

== See also ==
- Pettitt v Pettitt [1970] AC 777
