= Unincorporated association =

Association of persons without separate legal personality

An unincorporated association is a group of people in common law jurisdictions—such as the United Kingdom, Canada, and New Zealand—who organize around a shared purpose without forming a corporation or similar legal entity. Unlike in some civil law systems, where associations gain legal personality upon registration, these groups lack such status and arise from contract rather than (as in the case of companies) administrative fiat. They are distinct from unincorporated partnerships because their members do not unite for profit. Easy to form with minimal formalities, unincorporated associations offer flexibility but no separate legal identity.

These associations require a contractual relationship—without it, a casual group like friends meeting regularly does not qualify, no matter how often they gather. Under common law contract rules, they can even form unintentionally, as members may not realize their agreement creates an association. Often viewed as informal institutions, they aim for permanence and recognition apart from their individuals, spanning tiny groups (like an amateur football team splitting pitch costs) to vast organizations (like co-operatives, trade unions, or professional associations with thousands of members).

== Definition ==
Whether or not a group of people is an unincorporated association is not always clear. A summary definition is

1. a group of people
2. gathered for a common purpose
3. but not for profit
4. intending to create a legally binding relationship between themselves.

There is no statutory definition of an unincorporated association, so it has fallen to judges to define them. In the leading case in England and Wales, Conservative and Unionist Central Office v Burrell [1981] EWCA Civ 2, Lord Justice Lawton defined an unincorporated association as:

[T]wo or more persons bound together for one or more common purposes, not being business purposes, by mutual undertakings, each having mutual duties and obligations, in an organisation which has rules which identify in whom control of it and its funds rests and upon what terms and which can be joined or left at will.

The essential elements are thus (i) that there exist members of the association; (ii) that there is a contract binding them inter se (i.e., among themselves, to the exclusion of outsiders); (iii) that they have a common purpose which is not business; and that (iv) there must have been a moment in time when a number of persons came together to form the association (although those persons need not be the present members).

== "Unincorporated" ==
"Unincorporated" indicates that the association is not a legal person: it has no rights or duties in itself, and cannot acquire any. If, say, the group of people wants to enter into a contract to hire a football pitch (with the right to use it and the duty to pay for it), then the association cannot do this but must appoint someone (usually one or more of the members) to act on their behalf.

Similarly, an unincorporated association cannot own property (even its own funds): the members must appoint someone, usually a treasurer or small committee, who will hold the property as a trustee.

=== Special cases ===
In some instances statute intervenes to allow an unincorporated association to be treated as if it has legal personality, without actually conferring legal personality upon it: for example, in the UK, a trade union.

The UK also taxes an unincorporated association as if it were a company, without reference to the tax status of its members – despite the fact that those members are, in a strict legal sense, the only relevant persons.

== Legal basis ==
The characteristics of an unincorporated association in common law jurisdictions arise almost exclusively from case law, rather than from legislation.

Their legal basis is the general law of contract (including contracts of agency), which governs the agreements the members make with each other. Unincorporated associations are therefore entirely private concerns.

== Structure and governance ==
=== Constitution ===
Of the essence of an unincorporated association is that every member has entered into legal relations with every other, i.e., by a contract "inter se". Generally this is by subscribing to a written constitution.

=== Objects or purposes ===
Likewise of the essence is that the association has one or more purposes, and these are usually given at the head of the constitution. If it is impossible to bring an association's purposes into effect (e.g., where an association is formed to raise funds for a school which later goes out of existence), the association automatically dissolves. This derives from the rules surrounding frustration of contract. (For similar reasons, an association with only one object cannot amend it.)

=== Members ===
The membership is the sovereign body in the organisation, as it is from their consent to enter into the contract inter se that the association exists at all. Their powers should be clearly set out in the constitution. Often these are limited to:

- Appointing a committee to act on the association's behalf (usually by ballot but not always: it may be by consensus)
- Removing the committee in cases of mismanagement
- Approving the accounts and annual report of the committee
- Exercising a 'reserve power' to require the committee to do or not to do something
- Amending the constitution

=== Committee ===
As an unincorporated association is not a person, it cannot legally do anything. The members usually entrust ("commit") the funds and management of the association to a committee, who act on the association's behalf. (In a tiny association this may not hold: there may be a one-person "committee", or there may be no committee and all members are equally authorised to act for the group.)

The powers of the committee should be clearly set out in the constitution. If the association has no constitution, in the event of a dispute the Court will look to any general rules that the association has enacted and, as necessary, to principles of the general law. The committee are trustees for the members, and have a fiduciary duty towards them.

==== The chair ====
There is usually a chairperson, or simply "chair", who presides over meetings both of the committee and of the members. In practice many chairs are forceful individuals, but in law their responsibility is to act as an impartial umpire. Chairs may have other powers: again, these should be clearly set out in the constitution.

==== Other officers ====
Often a treasurer is appointed who is responsible for overseeing the funds of the association. Often there is a secretary who ensures all the rules of the association are duly followed.

== Liability ==
Because the association has no legal personality, outsiders face the challenge that it cannot be made liable for anything. If a sports centre hires a pitch to "Smalltown Soccer Stars", and the fees go unpaid, the agreement may be unenforceable. However, the sports centre can look for the person who actually booked the pitch and try to recover the unpaid fees from that person, or if they can establish that said person made the booking with the authority of the whole team (or of a committee) then the people authorising the bookings are collectively liable. The question turns on the general law of agency.

Once liability of one or more persons is established, their liability is unlimited.

== Legal difficulties ==
Legal difficulties arise from the fact that, while an association has no independent personality in law, it most certainly does have an independent existence for all practical purposes: members join it, leave it, and complain about how their association treats them; it probably has its own website, premises and bank account, and (in the UK) is liable to pay its own tax. Most significantly, people give it money as if it were an entity in its own right. In short, the legal underpinning is at odds with how people actually think and behave, and judges (and occasionally Parliament) have at various times tried to square the law with the social reality.

Whilst an unincorporated association cannot hold property itself, in the strict legal sense, there are mechanisms that are used to achieve the same effect.

=== Nature of held rights ===
There have been several theories proposed as to how rights, such as ownership of assets, are held by voluntary associations. In the UK, the question has been substantially settled by Hanchett-Stamford's case. The decision has persuasive force in other common law jurisdictions.

==== Joint tenancy ====
The oldest theory is that rights transferred to a voluntary association are held by the current members of the association as joint tenants or tenants in common. This has the result that the member can receive his or her own share (allowing for severance in the case of joint tenants) irrespective of the other members, in the same way that a joint owner of a business can do so. In Bowman v Secular Society this construction was even applied to a gift given to be applied for the general purposes of the association. It is difficult to imagine, however, that this construction would be correctly applied in the case of a philanthropic society, where construing the gift as one to the members would contradict its stated purpose. There is also the possibility that the gift is to the current and future members of the society, which, by operation of the Perpetuities and Accumulations Act 1964, will operate for the benefit of those members within the perpetuity period.

==== On trust for the purposes of the association ====
The second alternative is that the gift is to the trustees, or those officers who might properly be considered trustees, to be held on trust for the purposes of the association in a private purpose trust. Purpose trusts are not permitted in English law (with the exception of charitable trusts, which exempts charitable unincorporated associations from many of these difficulties), so any such gifts will fail for want of a beneficiary capable of enforcing the terms of the trust. However, the decision in Re Denley's Trust Deed allows for some trusts of this type to be held valid, and, accordingly, the case of Re West Sussex Constabulary's Widows, Children and Benevolent (1930) Fund Trusts applied this construction to the rights held by an unincorporated association. Reform to purpose trusts, such as making such a trust enforceable by a named individual (the chairman or treasurer, for example) rather than by a beneficiary (of which there may be none), would impact the role of the purpose trust in the voluntary association context.

==== Contract-holding ====
The third alternative is that members hold the property as beneficial owners, but are bound by their contracts inter se as to their ability to take out their share. That share is considered to pass to the other members of the association upon the death or resignation of the member. The holding may then either be considered absolute, or on trust for the membership as a whole, but it is the role of contract in each case to determine the rights of members, including the officers, to apply the money.

This approach was favoured in Re Recher's Will Trusts in relation to a gift to the Anti-Vivisection Society, although, on the facts, that society was considered no longer in existence and the gift failed for this reason. One statement of when such an absolute gift will be considered to have been made was given in Re Lipinski's Will Trusts:

Where the donee association is itself the beneficiary of the prescribed purpose ... the gift should be construed as an absolute one ... the more so where, if the purpose is carried out, the members can by appropriate action vest the resulting property in themselves, for here the trustees and the beneficiaries are the same persons.

Another statement of the principle came in Hanchett‐Stamford v Attorney‐General [2008] EWHC 330 (Ch), where Lewison J stated:

the property of an unincorporated association is the property of its members, but that they are contractually precluded from severing their share except in accordance with the rules of the association ... this kind of collective ownership must, in my judgment, be a sub-species of joint tenancy, albeit taking effect subject to any contractual restrictions applicable as between members.

This "contract-holding" theory is now considered the dominant theory in the field.

==== In practice ====
The question of which construction applies to a particular transfer must be ascertained in any particular case. A donor could decide on what basis he or she was transferring the rights to the association; however, this is rarely considered by donors and thus which construction applies is often affected by the judge's own beliefs as to common practice.

Sometimes the situation is clear: monies paid pursuant to a contract, such as raffle tickets and members' subscriptions, are normally taken to fall inside the third (contract-holding) category. As Goff J explained in the West Sussex case:

First, the relationship is one of contract and not of trust. The purchaser of a ticket may have the motive of aiding the cause or he may not ... Secondly, there is in such cases no direct contribution to the fund at all. It is only the profit, if any, which is ultimately received, and there may even be none.

Simon Gardner has argued that the principle behind such a conclusion is that the ticket purchaser was not at liberty to choose to transfer the money to be held on a purpose trust. There are situations where a contract enforced a payment on trust, such as Quistclose trusts and marriage settlements, that might be relevant to unincorporated associations. In particular, he suggests that an employer's obligation to pay into a pension pot, as occurred in Davis v Richards and Wallington, for example, might fall into this category.

=== Distribution of rights upon dissolution ===
An unincorporated association may dissolve for many reasons, including a decision by the members to wind it up or a court order. In addition, an association may sometimes dissolve spontaneously. One such case is where the purpose of the association becomes impossible to fulfil (e.g., if it was to raise funds for a school that goes out of existence). A second is when only one member remains: this follows from the association being a matter of contract, which by definition must be between at least two parties.

The distribution of rights in such a case depends upon how those rights are determined to be held.

If the purpose trust construction is preferred, then the dissolution of the association will not necessarily bring an end to the purpose trust, dependent upon whether the association is the "essential mechanism" of the purpose. If the purpose trust survives the winding up of the association, then new trustees may need to be appointed. The West Sussex case considered the effect of the association's dissolution on the rights held by the trust where the trust did indeed fail. In such a case, the monies paid to the association will ordinarily be held on resulting trust for the contributors. However, there may be situations (including money collected through collection boxes) where the contributor can be said to have "disclaimed" the resulting trust and it will be considered bona vacantia.

If the contract-holding theory is preferred, then the distribution of the rights held by the association will be governed by the rules of the association. These rules may contain an express term relating to the dissolution of the society, in which case it is considered operative. If not, a term can be implied as to the arrangements, as happened, for example, in Re Bucks Constabulary Widows and Orphans Fund Friendly Society (No 2). This will normally divide the rights up equally among those who were members at the time of dissolution.

==== Bona vacantia ====
Before the Hanchett Stamford case, it was suggested that the assets of an association that dissolves in certain circumstances would be bona vacantia. However, this view rested only on obiter comments.

In the case where the comments arose, the reason suggested was that at the time of dissolution, there were no remaining members, and therefore no one to own the assets. In Re Bucks it was shown that if there is only one member left then because there is no association, there is no question of membership. Therefore, in those circumstances, it might appear the property should go to the Crown.

That conclusion, however, was contested by those who believed beneficial ownership by the last surviving member would be more appropriate. (It is possible there may still be cases where, as a result of the contractual obligations of the members, no member can claim the assets of the association upon dissolution and then also they will be bona vacantia.)

In the Bucks case it was suggested that a term indicating some method of distribution would be implied as a matter of course; in particular, Walton J attempted to bring Cunnack v Edwards and West Sussex within the proposed model of implied terms, rather than by distinguishing them. This approach was not taken in Davis v Richards and Wallington where Scott J did not discuss implied terms directly when holding that the rights were now bona vacantia. This, Simon Gardner has noted, hints at a return to the 'eclectic', case by case, approach previously favoured by the courts. Instead, he says, judges should pursue a set of implied terms that differ according to the nature of the society (social club or pension fund, for example).

Lewison J's ruling in Hanchett Stamford's case would appear to have decided this question for the time being: he held that the assets do not become bona vacantia as long as one member of the association remains. This followed from his conclusion that the correct construction of the ownership was the “contract-holding” theory: as above, that the members own the association property “as joint tenants, subject to the [contractual] rules if the association”. When by death or otherwise only one member of the association remains, there is no longer any contractual restriction on her ownership, and she becomes absolutely entitled per the general law of joint tenancy. Indeed, from Lewis J’s reasoning it seems likely that even if this one survivor dies, their heirs will inherit what was previously association property.

=== Libel ===
Lack of legal personality means an unincorporated association ordinarily has no standing to sue for libel.

== Unincorporated nonprofit associations in the United States ==
In the United States, an unincorporated nonprofit association is "an informal group of two or more individuals who join together for a not-for-profit purpose without creating a corporation, LLC, or other entity to do so". The laws governing unincorporated nonprofit associations vary from state to state. In New York, it is recommended by the Lawyers Alliance for New York that unincorporated nonprofits have:

- A written statement of the purpose and common goals of the association;
- Articles of association and bylaws to set out the method of operation and the designation of responsibilities of officers, as well as signing authority, to carry on the various functions of the organization;
- A budget with funding requirements;
- Retention of accurate books and records.

— Lawyers Alliance for New York

In New York, "officers, directors, and members of an unincorporated association may be held personally liable for the debts and liabilities of the association if they authorize or ratify the activity". Contributions to an unincorporated nonprofit association may be deductible for US federal taxes if the association gets a 501(c)(3) designation from the Internal Revenue Service.

Several states in the US regard unincorporated nonprofit associations as legal entities separate from their members. These states include California, Alabama, Arkansas, Colorado, Washington DC, Hawaii, Idaho, Illinois, Iowa, Kentucky, Louisiana, Nevada, North Carolina, Pennsylvania, Texas, Wisconsin, and Wyoming. In states that do not recognize an unincorporated nonprofit association as a separate legal entity, the nonprofit "may not be authorized to hold title to property, may not be able to enter into and enforce contracts, may not be able to sue or be sued, and may not offer liability protection for its members".

== See also ==
- Associations in English law
- Voluntary association

== Bibliography ==
- Ashdown, Michael (2012). "The Law of Unincorporated Associations (Publication Review)". Law Quarterly Review. 128.
- Gardner, Simon (1992). "New angles on unincorporated associations". Conveyancer and Property Lawyer.
- Green, Brian (1980). "The Dissolution of Unincorporated Non-profit Associations". Modern Law Review. 43 (6): 626–649. doi:10.1111/j.1468-2230.1980.tb01612.x.
- Hayton, David (2001). "Developing the Obligation Characteristic of the Trust". Law Quarterly Review. 117.
- Pettit, Philip (2009). Equity and the Law of Trusts. Oxford University Press. ISBN 978-0-19-956102-5.
- Warburton, Jean (1992). Unincorporated Associations. Sweet & Maxwell. ISBN 0-421-44440-1.
