= Re Grant's Will Trusts =

- Court: High Court
- Citation: [1979] 3 All ER 359

Case opinions
- Vinelott J

Keywords
- Certainty, express trusts

Re Grant's Will Trusts [1979] 3 All ER 359 is an English trusts law case, concerning the policy of the "beneficiary principle" and unincorporated associations.

== Facts ==
A bequest was given 'to the Labour Party Property Committee for the benefit of the Chertsey Headquarters of the Chertsey and Walton Constituency Labour Party' and if the Constituency Labour Party (CLP) moved from the Chertsey UDC area his estate would pass to the National Labour Party. Its rules, which bound the members, could be altered by a non member: the National Executive Committee of the Labour Party. This meant that unlike a normal association, the members could not unanimously agree to waive the rules and divide the property between themselves.

== Judgment ==
Vinelott J held that the estate was to be kept intact as endowment capital on trust for the Labour Party's purposes, and therefore was void for infringing the beneficiary principle and the rule against inalienability. The Re Recher analysis (that donations take effect as accretions to the group's funds, subject to the contract that exists between the members) could not be applied. Referring to Re Denley's he continued.

That case on a proper analysis, in my judgment, falls altogether outside the categories of gifts to unincorporated association and purpose trusts. I can see no distinction in principle between a trust to permit a class defined by reference to employment to use and enjoy land in accordance with rules to be made at the discretion of trustees on the one hand, and, on the other hand, a trust to distribute income at the discretion of trustees amongst a class, defined by reference to, for example, relationship to the settlor. In both cases the benefit to be taken by any member of the class is at the discretion of the trustees, but any member of the class can apply to the court to compel the trustees to administer the trust in accordance with its terms.
