= Re Lipinski's Will Trusts =

Re Lipinski’s Will Trusts
- Citation: [1976] Ch 235

Keywords
- Certainty, express trusts

Re Lipinski's Will Trusts [1976] Ch 235 is an English trusts law case, concerning the policy of the "beneficiary principle" and unincorporated associations.

== Facts ==
Mr Harry Lipinski, who was active in the Hull Jewish community, gave the residual part of his estate ‘as to one half thereof for the Hull Judeans (Maccabi) Association in memory of his late wife to be used solely in the work of constructing the new buildings for the association and/or improvements to the said buildings’. The other half was one quarter for the Hull Hebrew School (Talmud Torah), and one quarter for the Hull Hebrew Board of Guardians. The next of kin challenged these provisions, questioning whether the gift to the association would not be void.

== Judgment ==
Oliver J held that the bequest was to the association absolutely, so in fact they did not need to use it for buildings (only constrained by the contract). The purpose was within the association's power to do, and it would be up to them to honour it.

If a valid gift may be made to an unincorporated body as a simple accretion to the funds which are the subject matter of the contract which the members have made inter se… I do not really see why such a gift, which specifies a purpose which is within the powers of the association and of which the members of the association are the beneficiaries, should fail… Where the donee association is itself the beneficiary of the prescribed purpose, there seems to me to be the strongest argument in common sense for saying that the gift should be construed as an absolute one within the second category…

Oliver J also remarked upon Re Denley as a Re Bowes type of case, where a purpose is disregarded, while saying it was ‘both with authority and with common sense’.

== See also ==
- English trusts law
