= Voluntary association =

Group of people with shared interests or aims

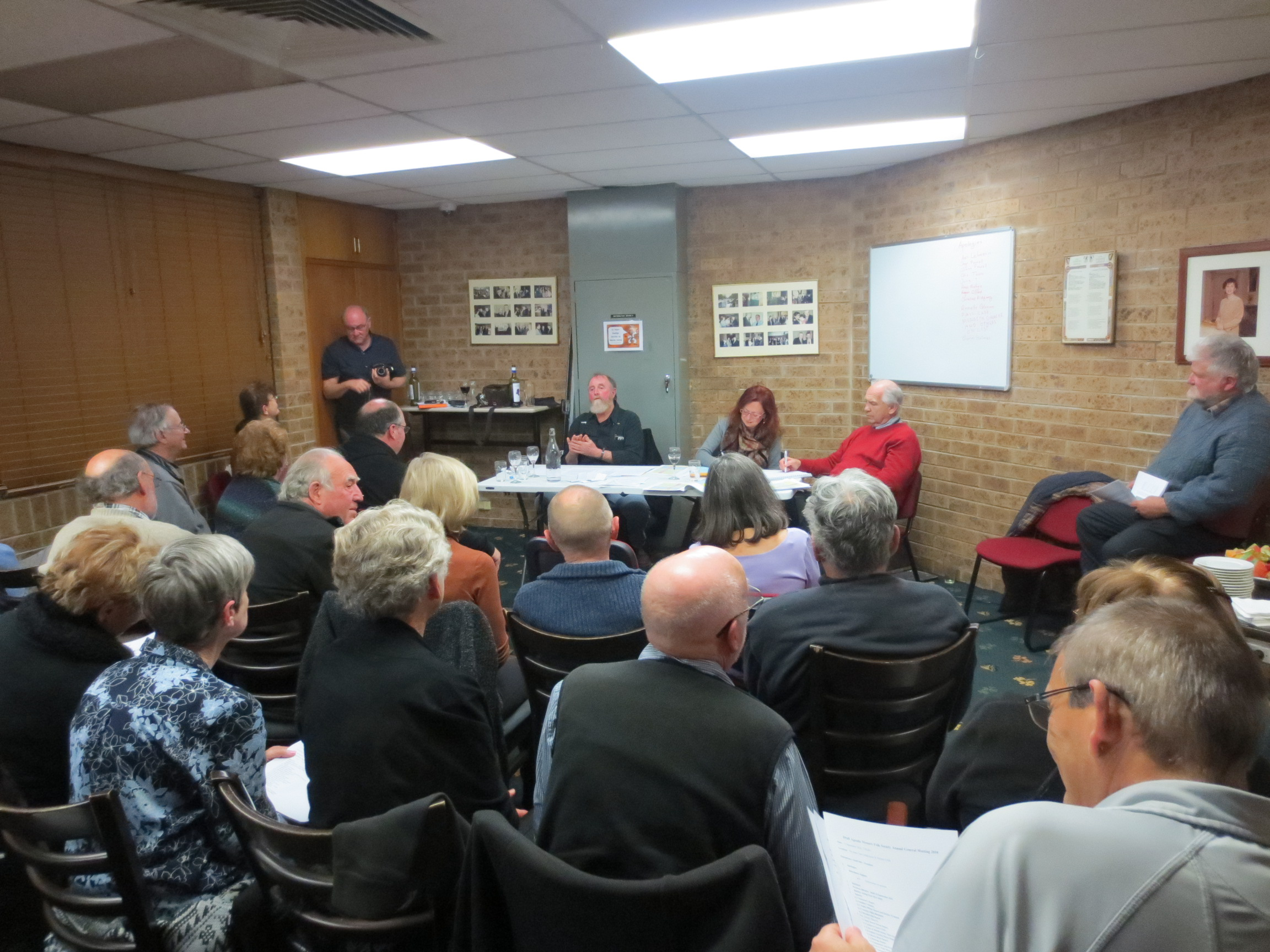
An annual general meeting of a typical small volunteer non-profit organisation (the Monaro Folk Society) in Australia. Office bearers sitting are president, secretary and public officer.

A voluntary group or union (also sometimes called a voluntary organization, common-interest association, association, or society) is a group of individuals who enter into an agreement, usually as volunteers, to form a body (or organization) to accomplish a purpose. Common examples include trade associations, trade unions, learned societies, professional associations, service organizations, and environmental groups.

All such associations reflect freedom of association in ultimate terms (members may choose whether to join or leave), although membership is not necessarily voluntary in the sense that one's employment may effectively require it via occupational closure. For example, in order for particular associations to function effectively, they might need to be mandatory or at least strongly encouraged, as is true of trade unions. Because of this, some people prefer the term common-interest association to describe groups which form out of a common interest, although this term is not widely used or understood.

Voluntary associations may be incorporated or unincorporated; for example, in the US, unions gained additional powers by incorporating. In the UK, the terms voluntary association or voluntary organisation cover every type of group from a small local residents' association to large associations (often registered charities) with multimillion-pound turnover that run large-scale business operations (often providing some kind of public service as subcontractors to government departments or local authorities).

Voluntary association is also used to refer to political reforms, especially in the context of urbanization, granting individuals greater freedoms to associate in civil society as they wished, or not at all.

== Differences by jurisdictions ==
In many jurisdictions no formalities are necessary to start an association. In some jurisdictions, there is a minimum for the number of persons starting an association.

Some jurisdictions require that the association register with the police or other official body to inform the public of the association's existence. This could be a tool of political control or intimidation, and also a way of protecting the economy from fraud.

In many such jurisdictions, only a registered association (an incorporated body) is a juristic person whose members are not responsible for the financial acts of the association. Any group of persons may, of course, work as an informal association, but in such cases, each person making a transaction in the name of the association takes responsibility for that transaction, just as if it were that individual's personal transaction.

There are many countries where the formation of truly independent voluntary associations is effectively proscribed by law or where they are theoretically legally permitted, but in practice are persecuted; for example, where membership brings unwelcome attention from police or other state agencies.

== History ==
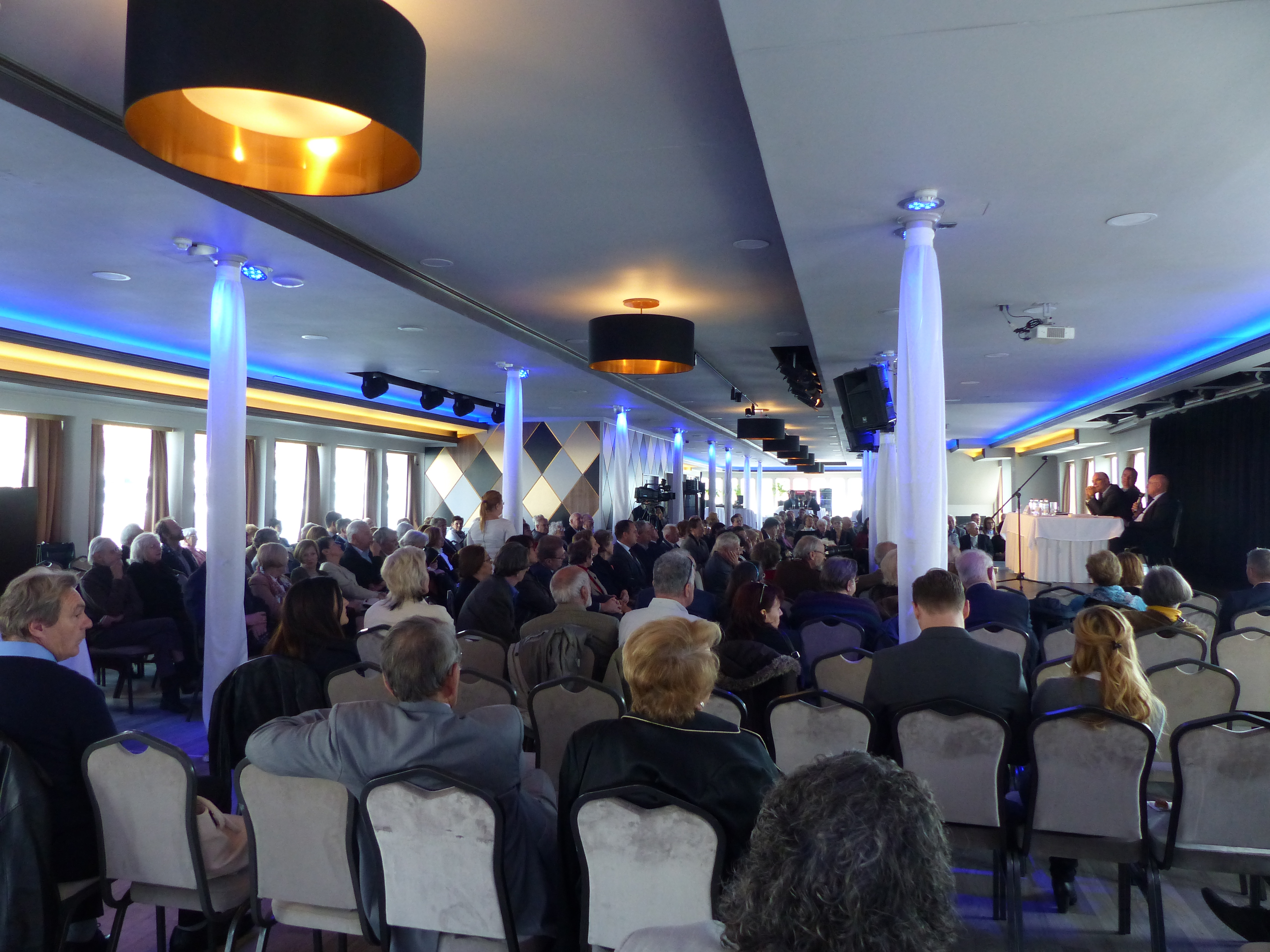
Civil lecture at Budapest Brainbar

Voluntary groups are a broad and original form of nonprofit organizations, and have existed since ancient history. In Ancient Greece, for example, there were various organizations ranging from elite clubs of wealthy men (hetaireiai) to private religious or professional associations.

In The WEIRDest People in the World, the anthropologist Joseph Henrich identified the enormous growth of voluntary associations as a key characteristic of preindustrial Western Europe, with governmental administrative duties often handled by guilds (which often controlled towns). Merchant guilds enforced contracts through embargoes and sanctions on their members, and also adjudicated disputes. However, by the 1800s, merchant guilds had largely disappeared. Economic historians have debated the precise role that merchant guilds played in premodern society and economic growth.

In the United Kingdom, craft guilds were more successful than merchant guilds and formed livery companies which exerted significant influence on society.

Hastings Rashdall was a major historian of the Middle Ages who set out the modern understanding of the medieval origins of European universities, noting that the earliest universities emerged spontaneously as "a scholastic Guild, whether of Masters or Students... without any express authorization of King, Pope, Prince or Prelate. They were spontaneous products of the instinct of association that swept over the towns of Europe in the course of the eleventh and twelfth centuries."

In Democracy in America, the French diplomat and political philosopher Alexis de Tocqueville observed that the elevated American propensity to associate distinguished American from European society.

== Legal status ==
A standard definition of an unincorporated association was given by Lord Justice Lawton in the English trust law case Conservative and Unionist Central Office v Burrell (1981):

"unincorporated association" [means] two or more persons bound together for one or more common purposes, not being business purposes, by mutual undertakings, each having mutual duties and obligations, in an organisation which has rules which identify in whom control of it and its funds rests and upon what terms and which can be joined or left at will.

In most countries, an unincorporated association does not have separate legal personality, and few members of the association usually enjoy limited liability. However, in some countries they are treated as having separate legal personality for tax purposes: for example, in the United Kingdom an unincorporated association is assessable to corporation tax. However, because of their lack of legal personality, legacies to unincorporated associations are sometimes subject to general common law prohibitions against purpose trusts.

Associations that are organized for profit or financial gain are usually called partnerships. A special kind of partnership is a co-operative which is usually founded on one person-one vote principle and distributes its profits according to the amount of goods produced or bought by the members. Associations may take the form of a non-profit organization or they may be not-for-profit corporations; this does not mean that the association cannot make benefits from its activity, but all the benefits must be reinvested. Most associations have some kind of document or documents that regulate the way in which the body meets and operates. Such an instrument is often called the organization's bylaws, constitution, regulations, or agreement of association.

== Common law ==
=== Australia ===
In most states and territories in Australia, a similar set of laws allows not-for-profit associations to become legal entities with a limit to the liability of their members. An example of such a law, the Associations Incorporation Act 1985 that is in force in South Australia, allows for the creation of a legal entity able to buy and sell land and in general, enter into legally binding contracts. Many clubs and societies begin life as an unincorporated body and seek to attain incorporated status to protect its members from legal liability and in many cases to seek government financial assistance only available to an incorporated body. Clubs and societies wishing to incorporate must meet the provisions of the relevant state act and lodge their constitution with the corresponding state government authority.

=== Israel ===
In Israel, many non-profit organizations (NPOs) and non-governmental organizations (NGOs) are established as registered nonprofit associations (Hebrew amutah, plural amutot) (some are established as public benefit companies (Hebrew Chevrah LeTo'elet Hatzibur) not to be confused with public benefit corporations). Amutot are regulated by the Associations Law, 1980. An amutah is a body corporate, though not a company. An amutah must register with the Rasham Ha'amutot ('Registrar of Amutot'), under the purview of the Rashut Hata'agidim ('Corporations Authority') of the Ministry of Justice.

The amutot are distinguisged from the Ottoman Associations, which predated the State of Israel, and are regulated by the 1909 Ottoman Law on Associations, based on the French law of 1901. Since 2014 there were attempts to modernize the Ottoman Law and put in line with other non-profits.

=== United Kingdom ===
==== England and Wales ====
Under English law, an unincorporated association consists of two or more members bound by the rules of a society which has, at some point in time, been founded.

Several theories have been proposed as to the way that such associations hold rights. A transfer may be considered to have been made to the association's members directly as joint tenants or tenants in common. Alternatively, the funds transferred may be considered to have been under the terms of a private purpose trust. Many purpose trusts fail for want of a beneficiary and this may therefore result in the gift failing. However, some purpose trusts are valid, and, accordingly, some cases have decided that the rights associated with unincorporated associations are held on this basis. The dominant theory, however, is that the rights are transferred to the members or officers absolutely, perhaps on trust for the members, but are importantly bound by contracts inter se.

Accordingly, on dissolution, the distribution of these rights depends on how they were held. A purpose trust may by its nature survive the dissolution of the association, or it may not. If it fails as a result of the dissolution, then the rights will be held on resulting trust for the contributors, unless they can be shown to have renounced their right to such a trust in their favour. If the rights are held subject to contract, then they will be divided among the surviving membership upon dissolution, according to the terms of the contracts inter se or an implied term according to contribution. If, as a result of this contract or statute, no member can claim, the rights will pass to the Crown as bona vacantia. This conclusion has also been suggested where the association dissolves because only one member remains, although this has been doubted by some commentators who believe the last members should be entitled to the rights.

==== Scotland ====
Scots law on unincorporated associations is essentially the same as English law.

=== United States ===
Each state sets its own laws as to what constitutes an unincorporated association and how it is to be treated under the laws. In the United States, voluntary associations which were incorporated were "pre-eminent" in collective action.

==== California ====
In California, during the 1980s, then Los Angeles County district attorney Ira Reiner decided to use California's unincorporated associations law to attack street gangs and the habit of their members of tagging graffiti in public spaces, in an attempt to abate vandalism and to recover cleanup costs. He sued the street gangs by name, with cases titled such as City of Los Angeles v. The Bloods and City of Los Angeles v. The Crips, which then allowed the city to go after any member of the street gang, as a member of the unincorporated association being sued, for damages resulting from graffiti tagging involving that gang's name,.

==== New York ====
New York state law regarding unincorporated associations actually gives members of the association more protection against liability than that given to either stockholders of corporations or members of limited liability companies. This was noted in the case of International News Service vs Associated Press, because the members of the AP are not liable for damages for the organization's actions unless the association as a whole approved it.

==== Texas ====
In Texas, state law has statutes concerning unincorporated non-profit associations that allow unincorporated associations that meet certain criteria to operate as entities independent of their members, with the right to own property, make contracts, sue and be sued, with limited liability for their officers and members.

== Civil law ==
Certain civil-law systems classify an association as a special form of contractual relationship.

=== Canada ===
Under the Quebec Civil Code an association is categorized as a type of statutory specific contract set forth in a constitution. An association can become incorporated with its own legal identity so that it may, e.g., open a bank account, enter into contracts (rent real estate, hire employees, take out an insurance policy), or sue or be sued.

=== France ===
In France, all voluntary associations are non-profit. They may count as unincorporated (association non-déclarée) or incorporated (association déclarée) and are created in terms of and governed by the Waldeck-Rousseau Act 1901. This is why association loi (de) 1901 is subjoined to their name, except in the Alsace-Moselle area, which is governed by local law in this regard (the area was German in 1901), and are therefore called association loi (de) 1908. If the association responding to defined criteria, like social or medical help, for example, they can be declared "public utility association" (association d'utilité publique) by French authorities. Associations created under the 1901 act have a significant amount of freedom in their internal operation, such as management or authorized members.

=== Germany ===
The German Civil Code sets out different rights and rules for an unincorporated association (nicht eingetragener Verein) with legal identity (Vereine, art. 21–79 BGB) versus an incorporated association (eingetragener Verein) with full legal personality, which the law treats as partnerships (Gesellschaften, art. 705–740 BGB). Associations can be for-profit (wirtschaftlicher Verein) or non-for-profit (Idealverein). Associations which pursue a public purpose can apply for tax exemptions (gemeinnütziger Verein).

== Freedom of association ==
The freedom of association stands in the United Nations' Universal Declaration of Human Rights:

Article 20

(1) Everyone has the right to freedom of peaceful assembly and association.
(2) No one may be compelled to belong to an association.

Article 11 of the European Convention on Human Rights also protects the right to freedom of assembly and association.

Article 11 – Freedom of assembly and association

1. Everyone has the right to freedom of peaceful assembly and to freedom of association with others, including the right to form and to join trade unions for the protection of his interests.
2. No restrictions shall be placed on the exercise of these rights other than such as are prescribed by law and are necessary in a democratic society in the interests of national security or public safety, for the prevention of disorder or crime, for the protection of health or morals or for the protection of the rights and freedoms of others. This article shall not prevent the imposition of lawful restrictions on the exercise of these rights by members of the armed forces, of the police or of the administration of the State.

== See also ==
- Active citizenship
- Anarchism
- Associations Incorporation Act 1981 (Victoria)
- Associations of the faithful (canon law)
- Collective
- Cooperative
- Encyclopedia of Associations
- Not-for-profit arts organization
- Registered association (Finland)
- Swiss association
- Unincorporated association
- Voluntaryism
