= Purpose trusts in English law =

In English law, a purpose trust is a trust created for the fulfillment of a purpose, not for the benefit of a person. These are normally considered invalid by the courts because they have no legally recognized beneficiaries, therefore nobody to enforce the trust, with the exception of charitable trusts, which are enforceable by the Attorney General as they represent the public interest. As well as charitable trusts, there are several exceptions to the rule against purpose trusts. If the requirement to fulfill a purpose is a request, rather than an obligation, the trust is valid; a trust will also be found valid if, while being for a purpose, it involves beneficiaries in some respect. Purpose trusts can also be valid if they are for the erection or maintenance of tombs and memorials (assuming such memorials are not overly grandiose), the maintenance of animals, and arguably the saying of masses, although these must all obey the rule against perpetuities and not continue for more than 21 years after the testator's death.

== Definition ==
A purpose trust is a trust created for the fulfilment of a purpose, not for the benefit of a person. While charitable trusts are also for the benefit of an abstract purpose, charitable purposes for the public benefit are an exception to the standard rule regarding purpose trusts, which is that they are void. The invalidity of purpose trusts is commonly said to have been set in Morice v Bishop of Durham. In Leahy v Attorney-General for New South Wales, Lord Simonds set the principle that:

A gift can be made to persons (including a corporation) but it cannot be made to a purpose or to an object; so, also a trust may be created for the benefit of persons as cestui que trust but not for a purpose or object unless the purpose or object be charitable. For a purpose or object cannot sue, but, if it be charitable, the Attorney General can sue to enforce it.

Alastair Hudson, Professor of Equity and Finance Law at the University of Exeter, argues that this is an example of the "strict" rule against purpose trusts. A looser application was found in Cocks v Manners, a case with almost identical facts, where the court decided that the trust was valid as a gift to every member of the order individually, with the Mother Superior acting as a trustee.

== Objections ==
There are a variety of objections to the idea of purpose trusts being valid. Firstly, English trusts law requires there be certainty of what the trust's goal is; most purpose trusts are for vaguely worded requests, such as the "maintenance of good relations between nations [and] the preservation of the independence of newspapers" found in Re Astor. Secondly, there is a general principle that there must be ascertainable beneficiaries. This is because, as said in Morice, "Every trust (other than a charitable one) must have a definite object. There must be somebody, in whose favour the court can decree performance". If there are no beneficiaries, nobody can enforce the trust in the event that the trustees fail to carry out their duties. The third objection is that of perpetuity; a trust cannot exist for all time. The standard rule is that no trust can be drafted so that any interest lasts for longer than the life of the beneficiary, plus 21 years. Therefore, no trust can be found valid if its interests last longer than this period. Purpose trusts, without beneficiaries, would cause unnecessary confusion if found valid because there is no marker by which to measure its existence. Purpose trusts may also be held to be invalid as a matter of public policy, where the courts conclude that the purpose is "eccentric or capricious and the court regards it as useless".

== Evasions and exceptions ==
There are several ways to evade the rules against purpose trusts. In Re Denley, land was given in trust to provide a sports ground "primarily for the benefit of the employees of [a certain] company and secondarily for the benefit of such other persons as the trustees shall allow to use the same". Although for the benefit of a purpose, the wording identified a class of beneficiaries, which allowed the courts to find it valid. One way to evade the rule, therefore, is to create a trust that benefits a group of people but is confined to a purpose. The judgment of Lloyd LJ, given in R v District Auditor, ex parte West Yorkshire Metropolitan County Council, seems to indicate that the test of certainty for Denley trusts is the same as for discretionary trusts. A second way of evading the rules is found in Re Tyler, where money was donated to a charity, with a request to maintain the donor's family vault; if this vault was not maintained, the money would go elsewhere. Because there was no obligation to maintain the vault, it was not considered a purpose trust. The existence of the Denley exception has enabled the purpose trust to be proposed as one way of holding rights associated with an unincorporated association.

In addition, the courts have recognised exceptions to the rules against purpose trusts. The erection and maintenance of tombs and monuments is a valid trust, as in Musset v Bingle; this will not be held valid if the gift violates the perpetuity rule, or if the scale of the monument is "capricious and wasteful". A good illustration of a capricious trust is provided by Brown v Burdett. There, the expressed purpose of the trust was to block up the windows and doors of a house for 20 years. Trusts to maintain animals may also be valid, as in Pettingall v Pettingall. Again, this is limited to the 21 years after the donor's death permitted by trusts law. Historically, religious masses have been considered an exception to the rules against purpose trusts, but in Re Hetherington, the saying of a public mass was recognised as a valid charitable cause. Private masses have been held to be capable of being valid non-charitable purpose trusts in Re Endacott

== Bibliography ==
- Edwards, Richard; Nigel Stockwell (2007). Trusts and Equity (8th ed.). Pearson Longman. ISBN 978-1-4058-4684-4.
- Gardner, Simon (1992). "New angles on unincorporated associations". Conveyancer and Property Lawyer.
- Hudson, Alastair (2009). Equity and Trusts (6th ed.). Routledge-Cavendish. ISBN 0-415-49771-X.
- Pawlowski, Mark; Jo Summers (2007). "Private purpose trusts - a reform proposal". Conveyancer and Property Lawyer. 2007 (Sep/Oct): 440–455.
