= Nadia Hijab =

Palestinian writer

- Born: Aleppo, Syria
- Education: American University of Beirut
- Occupations: Writer, political analyst

Nadia Hijab (Arabic: نادية حجاب, romanized: Nādya ḥijāb, [naːdja ħidʒaːb]) is a Palestinian political analyst, author, and journalist who comments frequently on human rights and the Middle East, and the situation of the Palestinians in particular.

== Biography ==
Hijab was born in Aleppo, Syria to Palestinian Arab parents, Wasfi Hijab and Abla Nashif, but grew up in neighboring Lebanon, where she earned a BA and MA in English Literature from the American University of Beirut. During her years of study in Beirut, Hijab worked as a journalist, but she left Lebanon after the onset of the Lebanese Civil War. She traveled first to Qatar, and then to London, England, where she became the editor-in-chief of Middle East Magazine and appeared frequently in the media as a commentator on Middle East affairs.

In 1989, Hijab moved to the United States, where she worked for 10 years in New York City as a development specialist for the United Nations Development Programme.

In 2010, she co-founded Al-Shabaka, a virtual think tank bringing together over 200 Palestinian thinkers and writers from all over the world. She was a member of the board of trustees at the Institute for Palestine Studies.

== Books ==
- Womanpower: The Arab Debate on Women at Work, Cambridge U.P., 1988
- Citizens Apart: A Portrait of Palestinians in Israel, co-authored with Amina Minns, I.B. Tauris 1990
