= Osoba =

Osoba is a surname. Notable people with the surname include:

- Abdul-Afeez Osoba (born 1995), Nigerian boxer
- Olusegun Osoba (born 1939), Nigerian journalist and politician
- Tony Osoba (born 1947), Scottish actor

== See also ==
- Re Osoba, English trusts law case between members of an Osoba family
