= Tareq Baconi =

Palestinian author

- Born: طارق بقعوني
- Education: University of Cambridge (MPhil); King's College London (PhD)
- Occupations: Writer, scholar
- Writing career
- Period: 2010s-present
- Genre: nonfiction
- Notable works: Hamas Contained; Fire in Every Direction
- Website: tareqbaconi.com

Tareq Baconi is a Jordanian-born Palestinian writer and scholar. He is the author of Hamas Contained (2018), a study of Palestinian resistance movements, and Fire in Every Direction (2025), a memoir of "queer identity, family history, and political awakening". His third book, What Now, was released in November 2026.

== Early life and education ==
Baconi is the grandchild of Palestinian refugees, his grandparents fleeing Haifa during the Nakba in 1948. He grew up in Amman and Beirut. Baconi completed a Master of Philosophy (MPhil) in International Relations at the University of Cambridge and a PhD at King's College London. Baconi is a British citizen.

== Career ==
From 2016 to 2017, Baconi was a fellow at Al-Shabaka, The Palestinian Policy Network, and as of 2025 is the president of Al-Shabaka's board, a position he assumed in 2021, succeeding Nadia Hijab. He was also a senior analyst at the Ramallah-based International Crisis Group.

Baconi's first book, Hamas Contained: The Rise and Pacification of Palestinian Resistance, was published by Stanford University Press in 2018; one reviewer praised the "meticulous analysis" of Hamas-publications and secondary literature in Arabic. The book "traces developments within Hamas's ideology and politics from its inception to its entrenchment in the Gaza strip". For the European Council on Foreign Relations, he wrote reports on the role the Eastern Mediterranean could play in energy distribution (2017) and the geopolitical consequences of water scarcity in the Middle East and North Africa (2018). The book was shortlisted for the 2018 Palestine Book Award.

His memoir Fire in Every Direction was published by Washington Square Press in 2025. Sceptre won the rights for the UK, while the US rights went to Atria Books. The book was described as "a queer coming-of-age story told against a backdrop of generations of violence and displacement, as the grandson of Palestinian refugees growing up between Lebanon and Jordan". It was the subject of a bidding war between various publishers. The memoir traces "three generations of displacement", beginning with his grandmother fleeing the Nakba, the uprooting of his family in Lebanon, and his own life, from his childhood in Amman where he fell in love with the boy next door through his college education in London.

His third book, What Now: On Palestine, Freedom, and Our Global Future, was published in November 2026.

== Publications ==
=== Books ===
- Hamas Contained: The Rise and Pacification of Palestinian Resistance. Stanford University Press. 2018. ISBN 9781503632622.
- Fire in Every Direction. Washington Square Press. 2025. ISBN 9781668068564.
- What Now: On Palestine, Freedom, and Our Global Future. Washington Square Press. 2026. ISBN 9781668250556.

=== Select essays ===
- "The Tale of Two Invasions: What the Last Attack on Jenin Tells Us About Israel Now", New York Times (2023)
- "The Two-State Solution Is an Unjust, Impossible Fantasy", New York Times (2024)
- "Confronting the Abject: What Gaza Can Teach Us About the Struggles That Shape Our World", Literary Hub (2024)
