= Endacott =

Endacott may refer to:

== People with the surname ==
- Frank Endacott, New Zealand rugby player.
- George Beer Endacott (1901–1971), British historian.
- Paul Endacott (1902–1997), American basketball player.
- Shane Endacott (born 1971), New Zealand rugby player.

== Other ==
- Re Endacott, an English trusts law case.
