= Re Bucks Constabulary Widows and Orphans Fund Friendly Society (No 2) =

Re Bucks Constabulary Widows and Orphans Fund Friendly Society (no 2)
- Court: High Court
- Citation: [1979] 1 All ER 623

Case opinions
- Walton J

Keywords
- Certainty, express trusts

Re Bucks Constabulary Widows and Orphans Fund Friendly Society (no 2) [1979] 1 All ER 623 is an English trusts law case, concerning the policy of the "beneficiary principle" and unincorporated associations.

== Facts ==
The Bucks Constabulary Fund Friendly Society was set up to give relief to widows and orphans of deceased members. It was an unincorporated association registered under the Friendly Societies Act 1896. It had no rules for how assets should be distributed if it was wound up. It was disputed whether surplus assets should go to the Crown as bona vacantia, or be distributed among the members equally on a per capita, or another basis.

== Judgment ==
Walton J held that the present members of the association shared in the surplus property equally.

I can see no reason for thinking that this analysis is any different whether the purpose for which the members of the association associate are a social club, a sporting club, to establish a widows’ and orphans’ fund, to obtain a separate parliament for Cornwall, or to further the advance of alchemy.

Unless there is a rule to the contrary, past members have no rights in a group’s assets, unless by death or resignation the society is reduced to one member. If so, the one cannot claim to be the association, as one cannot associate with oneself. So the property must be regarded as ownerless, and go to the Crown as bona vacantia.

== Significance ==
The ratio from this case is largely irrelevant following Hanchett‐Stamford v Attorney‐General in which dissolution by membership falling below two entitles the surviving member to the remainder of the unincorporated associations assets.

== See also ==
- English trusts law
