= Associations in English law =

Associations in English law are groups of people which are formed and act for a common purpose. In the United Kingdom, English and Scots law differ in the rules of contract and property, although a number of Acts of Parliament regarding associations are common to both jurisdictions. The five main types of association in English law are:

- common law associations, that are not incorporated under any particular Act of Parliament, but exist merely through a contractual agreement; normally called unincorporated associations
- trade unions, which are also formed by common law agreement, but are subject to special regulation under the Trade Union and Labour Relations (Consolidation) Act 1992
- a partnership, which arises automatically when people act together for the purpose of profit, and is regulated by the Partnership Act 1890, or alternatively registered with limited liability for most partners under the Limited Partnerships Act 1907, or for all partners under the Limited Liability Partnerships Act 2000
- trusts which are formed through consent of all involved, but are positively intended to be subjected to character
- companies that are incorporated under the Companies Act 2006 by registration at Companies House, which can include,
  - companies with unlimited liability for their members
  - a private company limited liability for members according to the share capital they invest (an "Ltd")
  - a company with publicly traded shares (a "plc") and limited liability for members according to share capital
  - a company whose members' liability is limited to the amount they have guaranteed (often a charity)

== See also ==
- Voluntary association
- English contract law
- English trust law
- UK partnership law
