= Purpose trust =

Legal trust with no beneficiaries

A purpose trust is a type of trust which has no beneficiaries, but instead exists for advancing some non-charitable purpose of some kind. In most jurisdictions, such trusts are not enforceable outside of certain limited and anomalous exceptions, but some countries have enacted legislation specifically to promote the use of non-charitable purpose trusts. Trusts for charitable purposes are also technically purpose trusts, but they are usually referred to simply as charitable trusts. People referring to purpose trusts are usually taken to be referring to non-charitable purpose trusts.

Trusts which fail the test of charitable status usually fail as non-charitable purpose trusts, although there are certain historical exceptions to this, and some countries have modified the law in this regard by statute. The court will not usually validate non-charitable purpose trusts which fail by treating them as a power. In IRC v Broadway Cottages Trust [1955] Ch 20 the English Court of Appeal held: "I am not at liberty to validate this trust by treating it as a power. A valid power is not to be spelled out of an invalid trust."

== Conceptual objections ==
The basis for the general prohibition against non-charitable purpose trusts is usually phrased on one or more of several specific grounds.

=== The beneficiary principle ===
A trust is, at its root, an obligation; accordingly, "every [non-charitable] trust must have a definite object. There must be someone in whose favour the court can decree performance." With a charitable trust, this power of enforcement is usually vested in the Attorney General. Such conceptual objections were weakened by the decision of the House of Lords in McPhail v Doulton [1971] AC 424, where Lord Wilberforce expanded the class of valid discretionary trusts, including trusts where the beneficiaries could not be listed, but beneficiary status could be easily determined.

Where the objects of a trust are a purpose rather than an individual or individuals, there is much greater risk that a trust would not be enforceable due to lack of certainty. Cases such as Morice v Bishop of Durham (1804) 9 Ves Jr 399 and Re Astor [1952] Ch 534 re-affirm the court's disinclination to enforce trusts that are not specific and detailed. It is noteworthy that the common law exceptions to the general prohibition on purposes trusts tend to relate to specific and detailed matters, such as maintenance of a specific tomb, or caring for a particular animal.

=== Excessive delegation of testamentary power ===
Purpose trusts have been attacked conceptually on the basis that it would amount to the delegation of a testamentary power, although subsequent cases have cast doubt on the correctness of that reasoning.

=== Perpetuity ===
Charitable purpose trusts are exempt from the rule against perpetuities. Private trusts are not. Accordingly, all non-charitable purposes trusts, to be valid, need to comply with the perpetuity rules in the relevant jurisdiction.

== Common law exceptions ==
There are, nonetheless, several well recognised exceptions at common law where non-charitable purposes trusts will be upheld.

=== Tombs and monuments ===
Provisions for the building or maintenance of tombs or monuments have been upheld as a matter of common law, although solely on the basis of ancient precedent. In Re Hooper [1932] 1 Ch 38 a trust for the maintenance of graves was upheld, but the court indicated that it would not have done so had it not been bound by Pirbright v Salwey [1896] WN 86. Such trusts still need to comply with the requirement of certainty. Hence a bequest to a Parish council for "the purpose of providing some useful memorial to myself" was struck down.

=== Animals ===
Trusts for the care of specific animals have been upheld. In Re Dean (1889) 41 Ch D 552, North J upheld a trust for maintenance of horses and hounds for 50 years relying upon much older authorities and the monument cases.

=== Quistclose trusts ===
Historically, Quistclose trusts have sometimes been considered to be purpose trusts, but the modern view is that they are resulting trusts to the settlor subject to a power to dispose of the assets in a predetermined fashion.

=== Private masses ===
Private masses, also known as prayers for the soul was upheld to amount to a trust.

=== Others ===
In most academic textbooks, there are usually a swath of "other" purpose trusts or purported purpose trusts that are held up as a residual anomalous category. The most commonly cited example is Re Thompson [1934] 342 where a gift to a friend of the testator for the promotion and furthering of fox hunting was upheld. It has been suggested academically that the case has "been elevated to a position of importance which it does not merit".

In Re Endacott [1960] Ch 232 it was made clear that the existing exceptions at common law would not be extended; they were described as "troublesome, anomalous and aberrant".

== Mistakes about the Common Law ==
Paul BW Chaplin has argued in the book "Purpose Trusts" (Butterworths 1999) that the courts took a wrong turn in the mid 20th century and ignored hundreds of previous years of judicial precedents in which purpose trusts of all kinds had been upheld as valid. He contends that the "beneficiary principle" has been misunderstood. His views have received support from Professor Jill Martin and others.

== Statutory exceptions ==
A number of offshore jurisdictions have enacted statutes which expressly validate non-charitable purpose trusts outside of the small group of specific exceptions recognised at common law. Some of the jurisdictions which have done so include the Bahamas, Bermuda, the British Virgin Islands and the Cayman Islands.

Characteristically, in those jurisdictions a non-charitable purpose trust requires a written trust instrument and the trust instrument must specify a protector or enforcer who will have locus standi to enforce the terms of the trust against the trustees. This role is created to address the concerns expressed by the courts as to how the courts would have power to control the trustees.

However, no real steps have been taken in any of those jurisdictions to address the fundamental conceptual issues of where the beneficial title to the trust assets should be regarded as residing whilst they form part of the trust fund. Arguably, if no other person is regarded as having a beneficial claim to the assets, they would be regarded as being owned solely by the trustees, which could have disastrous tax implications for the trustees.

In the United States, in 2015, the Nevada Legislature adopted legislation that now permits a "public benefits trust", which is defined as a trust that is not a charitable trust but that is "established to further one or more specifically declared religious, scientific, literary, educational, community development, personal improvement or philanthropic purposes. . . ."

== Unincorporated associations ==
Special problems arise in connection with the holding of property by unincorporated associations of persons. Whereas a company has separate legal personality and can hold property, with certain statutory exceptions, unincorporated associations of persons cannot. Accordingly, where an unincorporated association is formed for a non-charitable purpose (which is most often the case), a gift to an unincorporated association can fail as an invalid purpose trust. However, the courts have usually tried to avoid such a result by construing the gift as a gift to the members of the unincorporated association. The difficulty is that such a gift would then have to be construed as a distributive gift to the individual members, rather than a purposive gift for the objects of the unincorporated association. In Re Recher's Will Trust [1972] Ch 526 a more purposive approach was taken, and Brightman J held that a gift to The London and Provincial Anti-Vivisection Society was to be construed as a beneficial gift in favour of the members, not so as to entitle them to an immediate distributive share, but as an accretion to the funds of the society subject to the contract of the members as set out in the rules. Further, it was held that such a construction would be possible whether the society was inward looking (i.e. existed to promote the interests of its members) or outward looking (i.e. existed to promote some external cause or purpose).

== See also ==
- Purpose trusts in English law
