= John Vinelott =

English judge

Sir John Evelyn Vincent Vinelott (15 October 1923 – 22 May 2006) was a leading barrister at the Chancery bar and an English High Court judge in the Chancery Division from 1978 to 1994.

== Biography ==
He was born in Gillingham, Kent, and studied at Queen Elizabeth's Grammar School, Faversham. He started to read English at Goldsmiths, University of London, but his studies were interrupted by Second World War. He enlisted with the Royal Navy Volunteer Reserve before he graduated: the master-at-arms told him that hyphenated surnames ("Vine-Lott") were not used on the lower decks. He was later commissioned as a sub-lieutenant, but retained his new unhyphenated surname. He was sent to the School of Oriental and African Studies to learn Japanese, and served on destroyers in the Far East, reading Japanese signals. He bought a copy of Ludwig Wittgenstein's Tractatus Logico-Philosophicus in Colombo, which made him determined to study philosophy after the war.

He returned to his studies at Queens' College, Cambridge, studying philosophy under Wittgenstein and Bertrand Russell. He attended a lecture given by Karl Popper to the Moral Sciences Club in October 1946, "Are there philosophical problems?", which turned into an argument between Popper and Wittgenstein on the nature of philosophy. The precise events are disputed: some reports have Wittgenstein wielding a red hot poker before storming out; others that he merely used the poker as an example in his argument. The incident has been written about in, for example, Wittgenstein's Poker.

Vinelott obtained a first class degree. He considered an academic career, but turned to the bar instead. He was called to the bar at Gray's Inn in 1953, and married in 1956. He took silk in 1968, became a bencher of Gray's Inn in 1974, and was treasurer of Gray's Inn in 1993. As a barrister, he was a leading authority on trust law. He acted for the Official Solicitor in the debacle of the Pentonville Five, the five dockers' shop stewards imprisoned in July 1972 for contempt of court for defying an order of the National Industrial Relations Court. He appeared in court through most of 1976 in the long-running case of Tito v. Waddell, on the rights of Banaban landowners on Ocean Island in the Pacific, and before the House of Lords in 1977 in Gouriet v. Union of Post Office Workers, on the ability of a private individual to force the Attorney General to prevent a public wrong.

He declined an appointment to the Family Division, but was appointed as a High Court judge in the Chancery Division in 1978, receiving the customary knighthood. His dog, a springer spaniel, often accompanied him in court. He gave the first-instance decisions in the tax cases of Conservative and Unionist Central Office v Burrell in 1980, Furniss v. Dawson in 1981, and Pepper v. Hart in 1989, and various points in the Derby v. Weldon ligitagion in 1989 to 1991 .

He was not advanced to higher office before his retirement in 1994, but subsequently sat as a deputy judge of the High Court and the Court of Appeal until 1998.
