= Re Endacott =

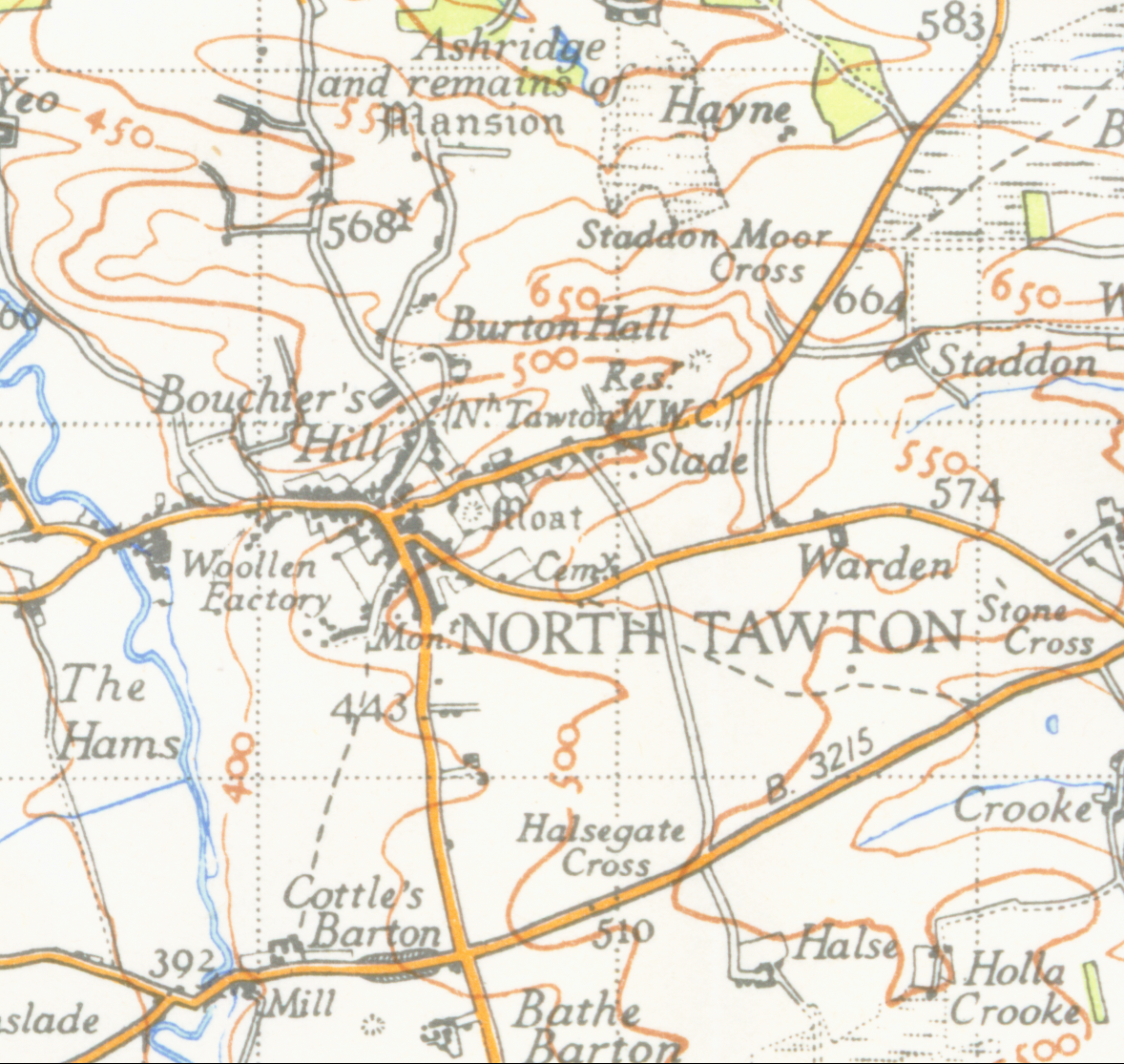
- Court: Court of Appeal
- Full case name: re ENDACOTT, dec CORPE v ENDACOTT and Others.
- Citation: [1959] EWCA Civ 5, [1960] Ch 232
- Transcript

Court membership
- Judges sitting: Lord Evershed MR, Sellers LJ, Harman LJ

Keywords
- Certainty, express trusts

Re Endacott [1959] EWCA Civ 5 is an English trusts law case, concerning the policy of the "beneficiary principle". It held that outside of trusts for animals, graves and saying private masses (and hunting foxes, until the Hunting Act 2004) no trusts can be made for purposes that are non-charitable.

== Facts ==
Mr Albert Endacott wrote in his will that he would give his son some houses and a factory, and then all the rest to the North Tawton Devon Parish Council ‘for the purpose of providing some useful memorial to myself’ unless his wife was still alive, in which case the interest should be paid to her.

== Judgment ==
Lord Evershed MR held that the trust was invalid, because it would be a purpose trust going beyond the fixed list that had been previously exempt.

Still, in my judgment, the scope of these cases (and I can call them anomalous because they have been so called both in the book which I have read and in the course of the argument) ought not to be extended. So to do I think would be to validate almost limitless heads of non-charitable trusts, even though they were not (strictly speaking) public trusts, so long only as the question of perpetuities did not arise; and, in my judgment, that result would be out of harmony with the principles of our law. No principle perhaps has greater sanction or authority behind it than the general proposition that a trust by English law, not being a charitable trust, in order to be effective, must have ascertained or ascertainable beneficiaries. These cases constitute an exception to that general rule. The general rule, having such authority as Lord Eldon, Lord Parker and my predecessor Lord Greene as authority behind it, was most recently referred to in a case which we had mentioned to us to-day, in the Privy Council, of Leahy v Attorney-General for New South Wales, 1959 2 Weekly Law Reports, page 722.

== Significance ==
Re Endacott put an end to non-charitable purpose trusts developing in English law, and stated that only the four previously acknowledge categories held good. Hayton and Mitchell question whether even those categories are genuinely non-charitable purpose trusts. As they see it,

- Re Dean (1889) 41 Ch D 552, a trust for the maintenance of stables and kennels of the testator's horses and hounds, should be viewed as a trust for the owner of the animals
- Re Hooper [1932] 1 Ch 38, building and maintaining graves and funeral monuments, are actually valid, even if private under the Parish Councils and Burial Authorities (Miscellaneous Provisions) Act 1970 section 1
- Bourne v Keane [1919] AC 815, trusts for the saying of private masses, are barely distinguishable from public masses. Only Re Hetherington [1990] Ch 1 divided the two, somewhat dubiously, because only if the prayer can be publicly be witnessed can it be for the public's benefit.
- Re Thompson [1934] Ch 342, to promote fox hunting is no longer relevant given the Hunting Act 2004. Moreover, this was just wrong as a decision because Romer J ‘erroneously based his judgment on negative enforceability by the default beneficiary when positive enforceability is necessary.’

== See also ==
- English trusts law
