= Re West Sussex Constabulary's Widows, Children and Benevolent (1930) Fund Trusts =

- Court: High Court
- Citation: [1971] Ch 1

Case opinions
- Goff J

Keywords
- Certainty, express trusts

Re West Sussex Constabulary's Widows, Children and Benevolent (1930) Fund Trusts [1971] Ch 1 is an English trusts law case, concerning the policy of the "beneficiary principle" and unincorporated associations.

== Facts ==
A fund was set up to pay allowances to widows and dependents of deceased members of the West Sussex Constabulary. The members resolved to wind up the fund, and money was left over. Money had come from (1) the members themselves (2) raffles and sweepstakes (3) collecting boxes (4) donations and legacies.

== Judgment ==
Goff J held all money was bona vacantia, except for the donations and legacies which were a resulting trust. He rejected that the members could claim a share of the property on the basis that the contract gave them any such right. Regarding the different sources he said: (1) Because the members' contract governed their contributions and gave them no claim to any residue, it was bona vacantia. (2) The raffles and sweepstakes contract also gave the participants no right to the leftovers, and thus that money was also now bona vacantia. (3) Collection box money was also bona vacantia because those people paid money out and out, with no intention for it to be returned in the event of a fund's dissolution. But (4) those who left donations or legacies could be regarded as having intended money should be retained only so long as the fund operated, so anything left over would be a resulting trust. The distribution of property between the members was only possible where the group existed for the benefit of the members.

== See also ==
- English trusts law
