= Conservative and Unionist Central Office v Burrell =

English trusts law case

Conservative Central Office v Burrell
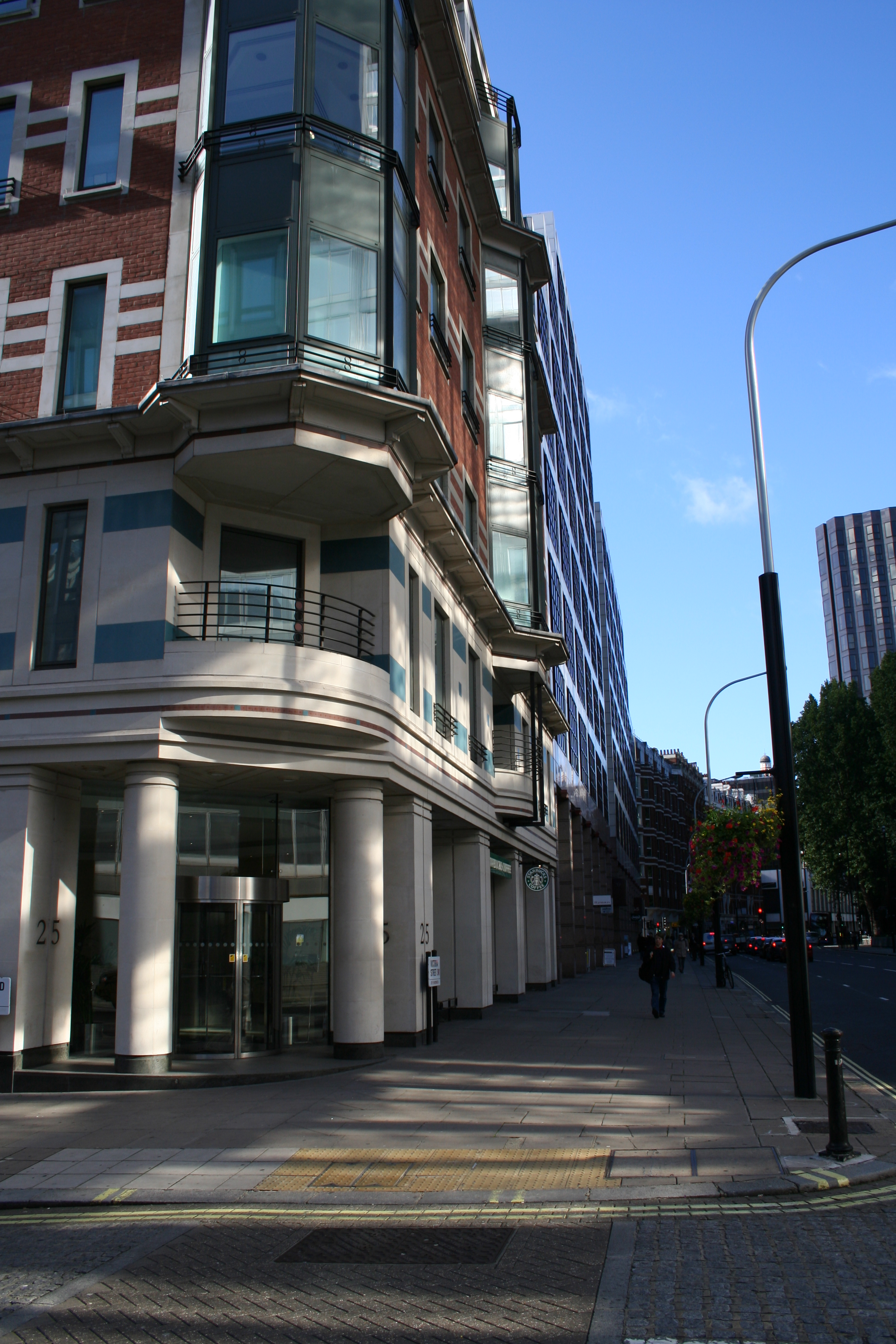
- Court: Court of Appeal (England and Wales)
- Full case name: Conservative and Unionist Central Office v James R. S. Burrell (Inspector of Taxes) (Note: Inspectors of taxes no longer make tribunal or court actions in their own name; instead they are made in the name of HM Commissioners of Revenue and Customs.)
- Decided: 10 December 1981
- Citation: [1981] EWCA Civ 2, [1982] 1 WLR 522 2 All ER 1; 55 TC 671, CA

Case history
- Prior actions: [1980] 3 All ER 42, Decision of Mr Justice Vinelott. Affirmed by this appeal.

Court membership
- Judges sitting: Lawton LJ, Brightman LJ, Fox LJ

Keywords
- Associations; liability to corporation tax on collective fund income; spending controlled mainly by leader; accounting to members; potential of resulting trust; relationship of association to members; whether meets all the requirements of an unincorporated association so subject to tax

Conservative and Unionist Central Office v Burrell [1981] EWCA Civ 2 is an English trusts law case ruling on the "beneficiary principle". The Inland Revenue sought to define the Conservative Party, a mixed-money, common-object body with regular spending for political purposes, as an unincorporated association. The direct subject matter was on the applicability of corporation tax, which was confirmed to apply to unincorporated associations but that the set-up of the party and its rules were not such an instance. The party was a sui generis body (body of its own class) meaning a lex specialis (set of special laws) should apply.

== Facts ==
The Inland Revenue argued that the contributions of members of the Conservative Party (formally, the Conservative and Unionist Party) took effect as an accretion to the funds (legally termed "mixed fund") which placed investments to make extra self-income, essentially controlled by the party leader due to rules in place voted on by the members and were thus the subject matter of a contract, which safeguarded and determined what happened with the members' funds. It argued that if that is so, then like a much smaller inter-members association where funds can revert with much more ease, such corporation tax should be payable.

Vinelott J at first instance in the Chancery Division of the High Court (Conservative and Unionist Central Office v Burrell [1980] 3 All ER 42) held that each contributor enters a contract with the treasurer, who undertakes to use the subscription for the association's purposes. Breach would mean liability in contract.

== Judgment ==
The Court of Appeal held there was no contract which connected the branches of the party with the members tightly among themselves (inter se), so the Re Recher analysis could not apply. Brightman LJ said donations to political parties give a mandate or authority as an agent to the party treasurer to add the party's funds. This must be used for party purposes. The mandate is irrevocable, but (essentially of relevance to other scenarios) the contributor has a remedy to restrain misapplication of money unless their own contribution had been spent already (the moment of spending and any misapplication judged by ordinary accounting principles). It was accepted that the same kind of temporary rescission and rare means of restraint (whether footed on contract or agency) could not apply for a dead person. Such a person could have authorised their will's personal representatives (executives) to do so.

Lawton LJ, referring to the Income and Corporation Taxes Act 1970, section 526 said:

Parliament meant two or more persons bound together for one or more common purposes, not being business purposes, by mutual undertakings, each having mutual duties and obligations, in an organisation which has rules which identify in whom control of it and its funds rests and upon what terms and which can be joined or left at will.

== See also ==
- English trusts law

== Notes and references ==
Footnotes
