= Daulia Ltd v Four Millbank Nominees Ltd =

English contract law case

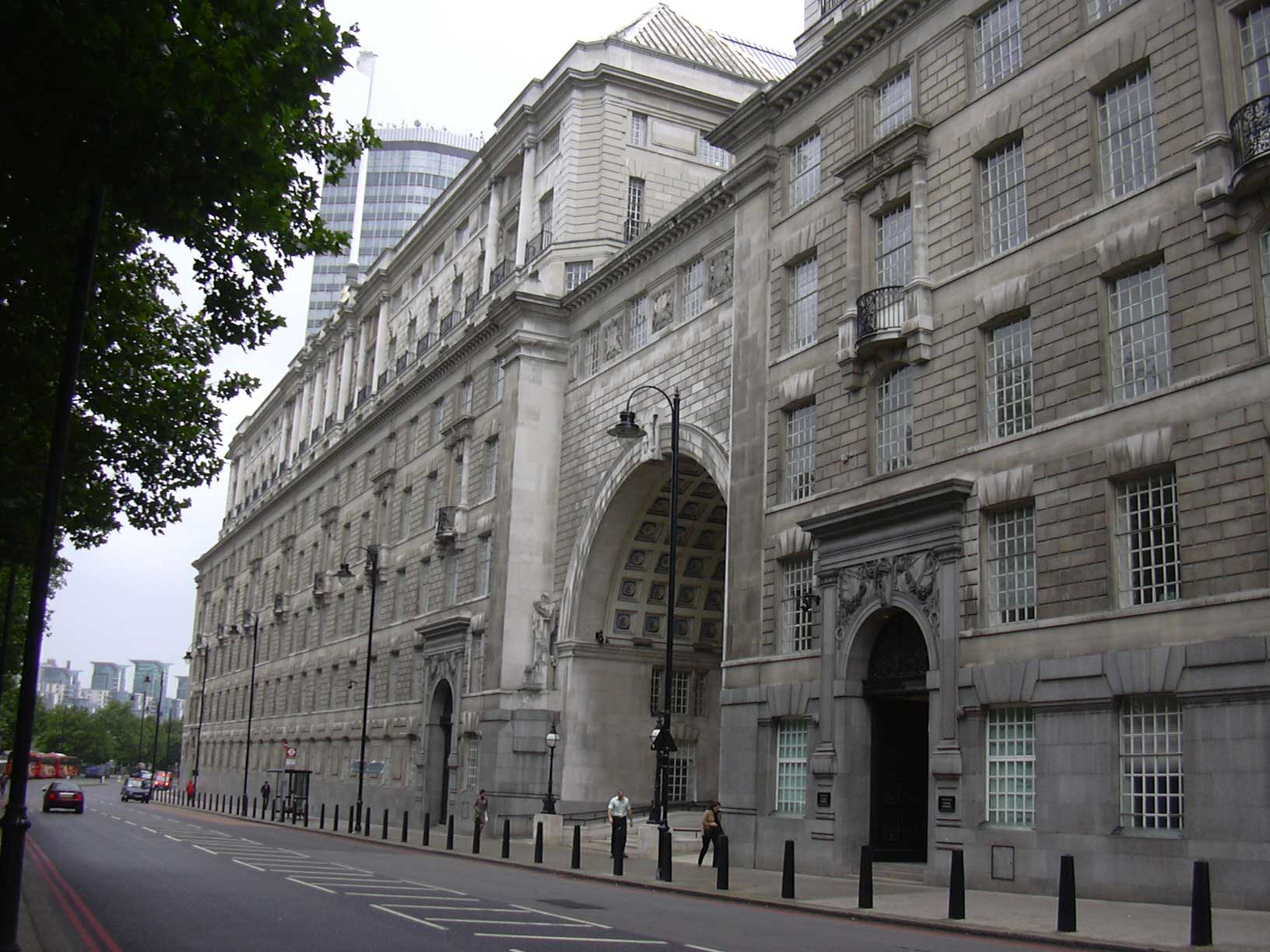
- Court: Court of Appeal
- Citations: [1977] EWCA Civ 5, [1978] Ch 231; [1978] 2 WLR 621; (1978) 36 P&CR 244

Court membership
- Judges sitting: Goff LJ, Buckley LJ and Orr LJ

Keywords
- unilateral offer

Daulia Ltd v Four Millbank Nominees Ltd [1977] is an English contract law case, concerning unilateral contracts, and when embarking on the performance of an act for which an offer is open, at what point the offer may be withdrawn. In particular, Goff LJ observed that there would be a duty to not prevent full performance of terms in a unilateral offer, once performance had begun.

== Facts ==
Daulia Ltd wanted to buy the premises on Millbank, London from Four Millbank Nominees Ltd, who were mortgagees in possession. Formal contracts were never exchanged, but Daulia argued they did obtain a unilateral contract by the first defendants that they would enter into a written contract of sale, if they attended Four Millbank's offices with a draft contract on terms already negotiated and a deposit. But when Daulia Ltd's representatives attended, Four Millbank refused to exchange. Daulia Ltd claimed breach of the oral agreement.

At first instance, Brightman J struck out Daulia Ltd's statement of claim for failing to comply with s.40(1) of the Law of Property Act 1925 (now, the requirement of form for contracts for interests in land under s.2, Law of Property (Miscellaneous Provisions) Act 1989). Daulia Ltd appealed.

== Judgment ==
The Court of Appeal dismissed Daulia Ltd's appeal. They held there was a unilateral contract for disposition of land, and therefore it could not be effective because it did not comply with s.40(1). Furthermore there was no act of part performance, which could lead to a binding contract. In the course of his decision Goff LJ said that had there been part performance, it would be a duty of the offeror to not prevent full performance (see also, Errington v Errington). Goff LJ's judgment went as follows.

I therefore turn to the first question. Was there a concluded unilateral contract by the first defendants to enter into a contract for sale on the agreed terms? The concept of a unilateral or "if contract" is somewhat anomalous, because it is clear that, at all events until the offeree starts to perform the condition, there is no contract at all, but merely an offer which the offeror is free to revoke.

Doubts have been expressed whether the offeror becomes bound so soon as the offeree starts to perform or satisfy the condition, or only when he has fully done so.

In my judgment, however, we are not concerned in this case with any such problem, because in my view the plaintiffs had fully performed or satisfied the condition when they presented themselves at the time and place appointed with a banker's draft for the deposit, and their part of the written contract for sale duly engrossed and signed and there tendered the same, which I understand to mean proffered it for exchange. Actual exchange, which never took place, would not in my view have been part of the satisfaction of the condition but something additional which was inherently necessary to be done by the plaintiffs to enable, not to bind the first defendants to perform the unilateral contract.

Accordingly in my judgment, the answer to the first question must be in the affirmative.

Even if my reasoning so far be wrong the conclusion in my view is still the same for the following reasons. Whilst I think the true view of a unilateral contract must in general be that the offeror is entitled to require full performance of the condition which he has imposed and short of that he is not bound, that must be subject to one important qualification, which stems from the fact that there must be an implied obligation on the part of the offeror not to prevent the condition becoming satisfied, which obligation it seems to me must arise as soon as the offeree starts to perform. Until then the offeror can revoke the whole thing, but once the offeree has embarked on performance it is too late for the offeror to revoke his offer.

This brings me to the second question. There are certain English cases touching this matter, but none precisely in point.

The plaintiffs rely strongly on Warlow v. Harrison (1858) 1 E1. & E1. 295 and Johnston v. Boyes [1899] 2 Ch. 73. In the former an auctioneer knocked down as sold for 61 guineas, which was bid by the owner, a pony which according to the particulars was to be sold without reserve, and the auctioneer, not the vendor, was sued for damages by the plaintiff who was the highest independent bidder at 60 guineas. In the Court of Queen's Bench, see p. 308, Lord Campbell held that there was no contract because the vendor had revoked the auctioneer's authority to accept the plaintiff's bid, and therefore no question of the impact of section 17 of the Statute of Frauds arose.

The Exchequer Chamber agreed with this conclusion on the pleadings as they stood, but allowed an amendment, and held the defendant liable; per Martin B. as upon a contract that the sale should be without reserve, and per Willes J. and Bramwell B. upon a breach of warranty of authority to sell without reserve, and Martin B. said at pp. 316-317:

"Upon the same principle, it seems to us that the highest bona fide bidder at an auction may sue the auctioneer as upon a contract that the sale shall be without reserve. We think the auctioneer who puts the property up for sale upon such a condition pledges himself that the sale shall be without reserve, or, in other words, contracts that it shall be so; and that this contract is made with the highest bona fide bidder; and, in case of breach of it, that he has a right of action against the auctioneer. The case is not at all affected by section 17 of the Statute of Frauds, which relates only to direct sales, and not to contracts relating to or connected with them."

This case affords support for the plaintiffs' contention as far as it goes, but it is distinguishable, since there the action was against the auctioneer, not the vendor, and it was not upon a contract by the auctioneer that he himself would sell to the highest bidder but that his principal would do so.

Warlow v. Harrison, 1 E1. & E1. 295 was approved by Cozens-Hardy J. in Johnston v. Boyes [1899] 2 Ch. 73, 77, where he related it to the vendor himself, saying:

"A vendor who offers property for sale by auction on the terms of printed conditions can be made liable to a member of the public who accepts the offer if those conditions be violated: see Warlow v. Harrison, 1 E1. & E1. 295 and the recent case of Carlill v. Carbolic Smoke Ball Co. [1893] 1 Q.B. 256. Nor do I think that the Statute of Frauds would afford any defence to such an action. The plaintiff is not suing on a contract to purchase land: she is suing simply because her agent, in breach of the first and second conditions of sale, was not allowed to sign a contract which would have resulted in her becoming the purchaser of the land. I think this conclusion results from the decision of the Exchequer Chamber in Warlow v. Harrison."

This, however, was merely obiter because not only was the action once again not against the vendor but against the auctioneer, but also the court held that there could be no liability anyway, quite apart from the effect of the statute, because the plaintiff's agent had not tendered cash, but only a cheque, which the auctioneer was not bound to accept. The case is in any event unsatisfactory because the complaint made was that the auctioneer had refused to allow the plaintiff's agent to sign a memorandum on her behalf, but that would not have been of any use to her. What was required was a note or memorandum signed by or on behalf of the vendor.

On the other hand Rainbow v. Howkins [1904] 2 K.B. 322, so far as it goes tells against the plaintiffs but again it is distinguishable, because the action was brought on the ground that the auctioneer was personally liable as if he were vendor under a contract of sale not upon a collateral contract, and alternatively for breach of warranty of authority, but it was held that he could not be sued on the first ground because of the statute, and could not be sued for breach of warranty of authority, because there was none since, apart from the statute, he had effectively bound the vendor.

Mr. Hoffmann also relied on Wood v. Midgley (1854) 2 Sm. & G. 115, and on appeal, 5 De G.M. & G. 41. That, however, was not a case of an agreement to enter into a written agreement but of a concluded oral agreement for sale with a concurrent or collateral agreement to reduce it to writing, so that again is distinguishable.

In these circumstances in my judgment it is necessary to consider how the matter stands in principle. As I see it the question is whether the unilateral contract is - and I quote these words from section 40 - a "contract for the sale or other disposition of land or any interest in land."

It is clear to me that ex hypothesi it is not a contract for the sale of land or any interest in land because it is a separate and independent contract to enter into such a contract.

In my judgment, however, it is equally clearly a contract for some other disposition of an interest in land.

It is not necessary in my view that the interest in land to be disposed of should actually exist at the time of the contract. I cannot doubt that a contract for valuable consideration to grant an easement over Blackacre would be a contract for the disposition of an interest in land within the meaning of the section.

Now, in the present case we have a contract to enter into a proper written contract for the sale of land. Such a contract if entered into would be specifically enforceable and would therefore give the plaintiffs a right to the land in equity and so would create and give them an equitable interest in the land. It follows in my judgment that the unilateral contract was a contract to dispose of an interest in land, because it was a contract to do something which would have that effect in law.

The plaintiffs say: "But we are not claiming specific performance; only damages." That, however, in my view is an irrelevant consideration for two reasons. The first, which is I think conclusive, is that we are not concerned with whether the "unilateral contract" could be specifically enforced so as actually to create an interest in land, but whether it is a contract to do that which, if done, would create such an interest. The words of the section look only to the contract.

The second is that the plaintiffs cannot escape the impact of the section by limiting the nature of the relief they seek and, moreover, the damages for breach of the unilateral contract must, as I see it, be exactly the same as damages for breach of the contract of sale would have been if contracts had been exchanged and then broken by the plaintiffs.

If, however, contrary to my view it be necessary that the unilateral contract should be one capable of specific performance, in my judgment it is so notwithstanding the decision of Stirling J. on motion in Johnston v. Boyes, 42 S.J. 610, which with all respect to that judge is in my view incorrect.

For this purpose one must regard the matter apart from section 40, for if one postulates that the section applies, one begs the whole question. So regarded, I cannot see how a vendor can escape an order for specific performance by agreeing (with sufficient particularity to be effective in law) to agree to sell rather than by a direct agreement to sell.

The dictum of Lord Wright in Hillas and Co. Ltd. v. Arcos Ltd. (1932) 147 L.T. 503, 515 "a contract de praesenti to enter into what, in law, is an enforceable contract is simply that enforceable contract, and no more and no less," with which I respectfully agree, does not directly apply, because prior to exchange of contracts which never took place the plaintiffs were not themselves bound to purchase or to enter into a contract to purchase. They could have resiled at the very last moment, even after tender, so that this was not a contract between A and B to make a contract between A and B, but a unilateral contract by A to enter into a particular contract with B, but in my view the principle must be the same.

I am fortified in this conclusion by the American case of Union Car Advertising Co. Inc. v. Boston Elevated Railway Co. (1928) 26 Fed.Rep. (2d) 755, a decision of the Circuit Court of Appeals, First Circuit. Mr. Godfrey pointed out that the court said, at p. 759:

"... it was virtually conceded by the plaintiff at the argument that under the law of Massachusetts an oral contract to execute a written contract for the sale or transfer of an interest in land is within the statute of frauds and invalid."

But the case before the court was not such a case but one of a contract not to be performed within the year. Therefore, he said, this American decision did not help because the position with regard to a contract for the sale or other disposition of an interest in land was not before the court, and anyway the court was dealing only with the law of Massachusetts.

So far as the second point is concerned the case is none the less persuasive authority, and as to the first, the citations in the judgment from other cases show that the concession was in truth in accordance with the law of that state, and show that law to be founded upon reasoning which commends itself to me and entirely accords with my own.

Thus in Sarkisian v. Teele (1909) 88 N.E. 333, where the subject matter was an oral contract to execute an unsigned written contract to sell stock in trade and to let the business premises, the court said, at p. 334:

"... if the bill is considered as seeking to enforce an oral promise by the defendant to enter into the formal writing, as containing all the essential elements of the contract, it cannot be maintained," and again "By the statute of frauds such an agreement was required to be in writing, and an oral promise to execute a contract embodying these terms also comes within the statute."

Further in McLachlin v. Village of Whitehall (1906) 99 N.Y.S. 721, as cited in 26 Fed.Rep. (2nd series) p. 758:

"... the trustees of the defendant village entered into an oral contract wherein it was agreed that if the plaintiff would increase his plant, so that he could furnish incandescent lights for private houses in the village, the trustees would renew..."

the written contract he then had for lighting its street, which would otherwise expire in 1897. In that case the court said, at pp. 722-723:

"The question is therefore presented whether damages can be recovered for the breach of an oral agreement to enter into a contract, which, under the statute of frauds, is required to be in writing. It is true that the oral agreement to enter into the written contract might be fully performed within a year or within a day. The action is not in form one to recover damages for a breach of contract for lighting the streets and public places for a term of five years, but for damages consequent upon a breach of the verbal agreement to award such a contract to the plaintiff. The damages, however, claimed as consequent upon such breach, are none other than the same damages as would have been recoverable for breach of the contract for lighting if it had been awarded to the plaintiff.... It is conceded that a contract for lighting for a term of five years would be void if not in writing, but if an oral agreement to enter into such a written contract is not also void, where the damages claimed for the breach of the oral agreement are not independent of it, but necessarily are the same as those which would arise from the breach of the written contract, the door would be open for the practical nullification of the statute of frauds in a large class of cases."

The law is similarly stated in 72 American Jurist (2nd Series), Statute of Frauds, para. 4:

"The general rule is that an oral agreement to reduce to writing a contract which is within the scope of the operation of the statute of frauds, or to sign an agreement which the statute of frauds requires to be in writing, is invalid and unenforceable."

In my judgment, therefore, the unilateral contract in this case is prima facie unenforceable, and I turn to the third question.

The plaintiffs rely on all and every of the acts done by them to satisfy the conditions of the "unilateral contract," as being also sufficient acts of part performance.

The first defendants say that that cannot be so because nothing can be part performance if done before there is any binding contract. Mr. Hoffmann puts his case as high as saying that by definition there can never be part performance of a unilateral contract.

I doubt whether that is right as a general principle, since in most cases the performance of the condition by the offeree is also the discharge of all his obligations and is certainly done pursuant to the inchoate contract. I think in many cases the offeree's acts may amount to part performance, though I doubt whether in this case they caused sufficient prejudice to the plaintiffs to raise an equity on which the first defendants could be charged.

In my view, however, it is unnecessary to decide these questions since in my judgment the ease fails because none of the alleged acts of part performance of themselves suggests that there was any contract between the parties. Indeed they point to the exact opposite and suggest that the parties were about to make or contemplated making a contract. It is only if one first looks to see what the oral contract is, and finds that it is a unilateral contract, such as pleaded in this ease, that the acts can begin to be regarded as part performance, but that is an inquiry which one is not permitted to make: see per Lord Reid in Steadman v. Steadman [1976] A.C. 536, 541-542, where he said:

"I think that there has been some confusion between this supposed rule and another perfectly good rule. You must not first look at the oral contract and then see whether the alleged acts of part performance are consistent with it. You must first look at the alleged acts of part performance to see whether they prove that there must have been a contract and it is only if they do so prove that you can bring in the oral contract.... In my view, unless the law is to be divorced from reason and principle, the rule must be that you take the whole circumstances, leaving aside evidence about the oral contract, to see whether it is proved that the acts relied on were done in reliance on a contract: that will be proved if it is shown to be more probable than not."

Lord Salmon appears to have taken a contrary view: he said, at p. 571:

"In the present case, the payment of £100 by the husband to his wife who had divorced him - looked at without regard to its surrounding circumstances - would not be any evidence of any contract, let alone of a contract concerning land."

The other members of the court did not state the position so specifically one way or the other, but both Viscount Dilhorne at p. 553 and Lord Simon at p. 561 accepted the statement in Fry, Specific Performance of Contract, 6th ed. (1921), p. 278, section 582:

"The true principle, however, of the operation of acts of part performance seems only to require that the acts in question be such as must be referred to some contract, and may be referred to the alleged one; that they prove the existence of some contract, and are consistent with the contract alleged,"

approved by Upjohn L.J. in Kingswood Estate Co. Ltd. v. Anderson [1963] 2 Q.B. 169, 189. Here, of course, the acts do not prove any contract.

The plaintiffs argue that whilst one may not look to see what oral contract is alleged, one may look at the promise made as part of the surrounding circumstances and then the alleged acts of part performance are explained and shown to be referable to the existence of a contract; but that, with all respect, I reject as too subtle, and in reality looking to and examining the alleged acts of part performance in the light of the alleged contract.

For these reasons in my judgment the plaintiffs fail on the third question also, and I would dismiss this appeal. I intended to say that I would do so with considerable regret as the first defendants' conduct unexplained appeared to me to be unmeritorious. However, this case having been heard simply on an application to strike out the statement of claim as disclosing no cause of action, the motives or reasons which influenced the defendants have not been investigated, and we were informed by counsel that at the very last moment the mortgagors found a purchaser at a higher price and so they felt themselves bound to reject the plaintiffs despite the assurances they had given them. It seems, therefore, that in this particular case there may be a good explanation and I leave it there.

== See also ==
- Carlill v Carbolic Smoke Ball Co
