= Re Bowes =

1896 English trusts law case

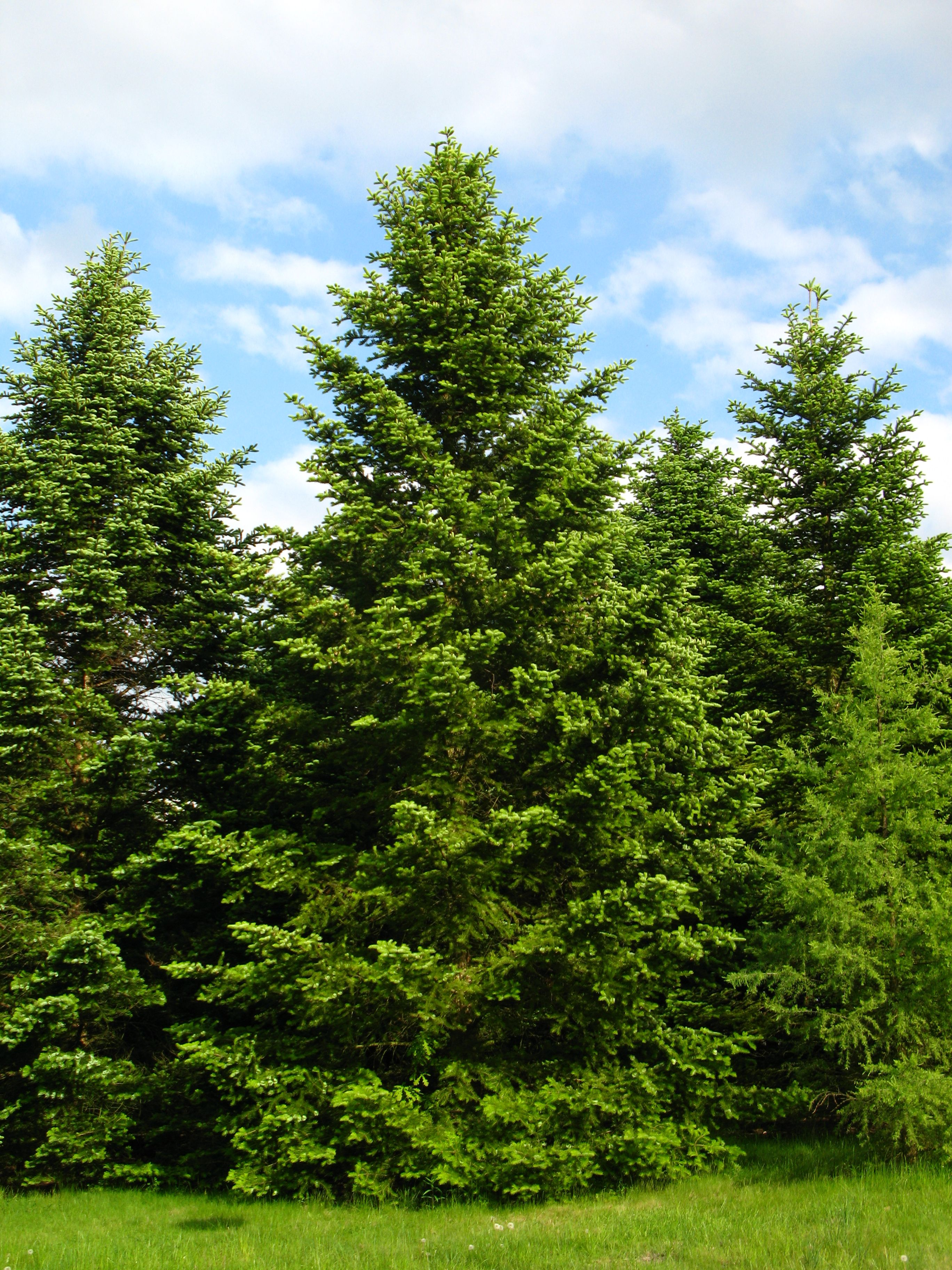
- Court: High Court
- Citation: [1896] 1 Ch 507

Keywords
- Certainty, express trusts

Re Bowes [1896] 1 Ch 507 is an English trusts law case, concerning the policy of the "beneficiary principle". It held that a trust which uses words relating to a purpose of doing something, but ultimately for the benefit of a group of people, can be construed as being for the benefit of those people. The consequence is that the people may exercise their right to dissolve the trust, according to Saunders v Vautier.

== Facts ==
John Bowes in his will left his estate to the Earl of Strathmore for life, and then the rest in tail. But included, was a gift of £5000 to the trustees for ‘planting trees for shelter on the Wemmergill estate’. There was much more money than needed for planting trees.

== Judgment ==
North J held that the trust was for the benefit of the owners of the estate. Hence the residents could use the surplus money in the way they chose.

== See also ==
- English trusts law
