= Wasfi Hijab =

Palestinian mathematician and philosopher (1919–2004)

Wasfi (W.A.) Hijab (1919–2004) was a Palestinian mathematician and philosopher.

== Biography ==
Hijab was born in Nablus, Palestine. He studied Mathematics at the American University of Beirut, following which he taught at a Jerusalem high school during World War 2.

After the war ended in 1945, he arrived at Trinity College, Cambridge on a scholarship, studying philosophy under Ludwig Wittgenstein, who acted as a supervisor for his thesis which he never finished. At Cambridge he served as secretary of the Moral Sciences Club, including during a famous incident where Wittgenstein allegedly threatened Karl Popper with a fireplace poker. He also invited A.J. Ayer to speak before the club. Hijab noted in the minutes of the meeting only that "the meeting was charged to an unusual degree with a spirit of controversy". During the academic year of 1945/6 he attended weekly afternoon discussions with Wittgenstein and his fellow student Elizabeth Anscombe on the topic of religion. Anscombe kept notes of these meetings which were later published as Reminiscences of Wittgenstein. At Cambridge he got to know the author Iris Murdoch, whom he befriended.

As his student from Michaelmas 1945 to Easter 1947, Wittgenstein made a deep impression on Hijab, who described him as "like an atomic bomb, a tornado". Shah was so overwhelmed by Wittgenstein that he abandoned philosophy for fifty years.

Hijab returned to the Middle East in 1948, where he taught in Syria for a few years. In 1953 he returned to the United States, obtaining a PhD in mathematics at the University of Florida in 1956. He subsequently became a faculty member at the American University of Beirut. He was elected a member of the American Mathematical Society in April 1958. In the final years of his life he returned to philosophy, giving two talks at the 1999 International Wittgenstein Symposium. He was working on a philosophical autobiography describing the influence of Wittgenstein on his life when he died.

== Selected works ==
- (co-edited with E.S. Kennedy) Al-Kashi on Root Extraction. American University of Beirut. 1960.
- "Logical Quantifiers: An Aid to Clear Thinking", in The American Mathematical Monthly, Vol. 70, No. 1 (Jan., 1963), pp. 77-79.
- Wasfi Hijab. "Wittgenstein's Missing Map". In Haller, Rudolf; Puhl, Klaus (eds.). Wittgenstein and the Future of Philosophy - A Reassessment after 50 Years.
