= Peter Munz =

New Zealand academic

Peter Munz (12 May 1921 – 14 October 2006) was a philosopher and historian, Professor of the Victoria University of Wellington; among the major influences on his work were Karl Popper and Ludwig Wittgenstein. Munz is one of two students who studied under both Popper and Wittgenstein.

== Early life and education ==
Munz was born in Chemnitz, Germany in 1921, and educated in Germany, Switzerland, and Italy. The Munz family were Jewish, and the rise of fascism in Italy and Nazism in Germany led Munz and his mother and sister to emigrate to New Zealand. They arrived in Christchurch in January 1940.

Later in 1940, Munz enrolled in Canterbury University College, where he studied German, history and philosophy. His philosophy lecturer was Karl Popper, who had also migrated from Europe to New Zealand to escape the Nazi regime. The two men became close friends.

After graduating from Canterbury in 1944, Munz earned a PhD at Cambridge University in England. At Cambridge he studied under Ludwig Wittgenstein.

== Academic career ==
Munz returned to New Zealand to lecture at Victoria University of Wellington, where he taught the history of the Middle Ages, 17th century France, and the French Revolution. He published work on medieval history, and translated the work of other writers from German and Italian into English.

From the 1950s, Munz also researched and published on the place of religion in modern thought and the role of myth in society. From the mid 1970s, his work focused increasingly on philosophy. Some of his published work focused on his two mentors, Popper and Wittgenstein. He agreed with Popper that there is no such a thing as certain knowledge, and that societies are better off when knowledge is free and open.

One of his former students wrote that Munz "liked being provocative", and in his later life he took several controversial positions. He was highly critical of postmodern history, and in 1994 published a long and scathing review of Anne Salmond's book Two Worlds in which he suggested that she was less interested in historical truth than "faddish" postmodernism and political correctness.

In 2004 Munz appeared before the New Zealand Parliament's Law and Order select committee to argue that consensual incest should be legalised. He argued that "the prohibition of incest is completely universal in early Palaeolithic societies and has lingered on ever since. But in modern civil societies it is an outmoded prohibition."

He was a frequent critic of the state of Israel, saying that "I'm Jewish myself and I find it absolutely devastating how other Jews can do things like steal other people's lands and then kill them."

== Major works ==
- The Place of Hooker in the History of Thought (1952)
- Problems of Religious Knowledge (1959)
- The Origin of the Carolingian Empire (1960)
- Relationship and Solitude: An Inquiry into the Relationship between Myth, Metaphysics and Ethics (1964)
- Life in the Age of Charlemagne (1969)
- Frederick Barbarossa: A Study in Medieval Politics (1969)
- When the Golden Bough Breaks: Structuralism or Typology? (1973)
- The Shapes of Time: A New Look at the Philosophy of History (1977)
- Our Knowledge of the Growth of Knowledge: Popper or Wittgenstein? (1985)
- Philosophical Darwinism: On the Origin of Knowledge by Means of Natural Selection (1993)
- Critique of Impure Reason: An Essay on Neurons, Somatic Markers, and Consciousness (1999)
  - n.b. not to be confused with Critique of Impure Reason: Horizons of Possibility and Meaning by Steven James Bartlett
- Beyond Wittgenstein's Poker: New Light on Popper and Wittgenstein (2004)

== See also ==
- Cambridge University Moral Sciences Club
