= Al-Shabaka, The Palestinian Policy Network =

Palestinian thinktank

- Al-Shabaka
- Predecessor: Middle East Policy Network
- Formation: 2009; 17 years ago
- Tax ID no.: 27-0627017
- Location: New York
- Revenue: $183,701 (2015)
- Website: al-shabaka.org/en/

Al-Shabaka, The Palestinian Policy Network is an independent, transnational think tank, whose mission is to convene "a multidisciplinary, global network of Palestinian analysts to produce critical policy analysis and collectively imagine a new policymaking paradigm for Palestine and Palestinians worldwide."

== History ==
Al-Shabaka was launched in 2010 and was described as "Palestine's first independent think tank". Al-Shabaka was registered in California in 2009 as the Middle East Policy Network, doing business as Al-Shabaka: The Palestinian Policy Network, and granted 501(c)(3) by the US Internal Revenue Service in 2013.

According to Cherine Hussein, an academic based at the Swedish Institute for International Affairs, Al-Shabaka's launch was a "significant initiative" by "[Palestinian] intellectuals". and was launched "to put a stronger Palestinian policy voice on the map". Its work "is primarily directed to concerned Palestinians as well as Arab and international policy communities." In a 2021 scholarly literature review, anthropologist Sa'ed Atshan cites Al-Shabaka as a "potential future addition" to the "ecosystem" of anthropology of Palestine.

== Recognition ==
Al-Shabaka has appeared in Global Go To Think Tank Index Report, produced by The Think Tanks and Civil Societies Program (TTCSP) of the Lauder Institute at the University of Pennsylvania, from 2013 to 2020. Al-Shabaka has ranked between 35th – 33rd out of 85 in 'Best Think Tank Network'.

== Notable fellows, board members ==
- Tareq Baconi
