= Wittgenstein's Poker =

2001 book by David Edmonds and John Eidinow

Wittgenstein's Poker: The Story of a Ten-Minute Argument Between Two Great Philosophers is a 2001 book by BBC journalists David Edmonds and John Eidinow about events in the history of philosophy involving Sir Karl Popper and Ludwig Wittgenstein, leading to a confrontation at the Cambridge University Moral Sciences Club in 1946. The book was a bestseller and received positive reviews.

== Summary ==
On 25 October 1946, Karl Popper (at the London School of Economics), was invited to present a paper entitled "Are There Philosophical Problems?" at a meeting of the Cambridge University Moral Sciences Club, which was chaired by Ludwig Wittgenstein. The two started arguing vehemently over whether there existed substantial problems in philosophy, or merely linguistic puzzles—the position taken by Wittgenstein. In Popper's, and the popular, account, Wittgenstein used a fireplace poker to emphasize his points, gesturing with it as the argument grew more heated. Eventually, Wittgenstein claimed that philosophical problems were non-existent, in response, Popper claimed there were many issues in philosophy, such as setting a basis for moral guidelines. Wittgenstein then thrust the poker at Popper, challenging him to give any example of a moral rule, Popper (later) claimed to have said:

Not to threaten visiting lecturers with pokers

upon which (according to Popper) Wittgenstein threw down the poker and stormed out. Wittgenstein's Poker collects and characterizes the accounts of the argument, as well as establishing the context of the careers of Popper, Wittgenstein and Bertrand Russell. This meeting was the only time the three were in the same room together. However, its historicity is arguable, and is claimed to have the potential to have been dramatised by Popper.

The book follows three narrative threads, each pivoting off the 1946 confrontation at Cambridge; the first is a documentary investigation into what precisely took place and the controversy over the differing accounts from observers; the second, a comparative personal history of the philosophers, contrasting their origins in Vienna, their relationship to the Vienna Circle and their differing ascents to philosophical prominence; and thirdly an exploration of the philosophical significance of the disagreement between the two and its relevance for the great debates in the early 20th century concerning the philosophy of language.

== Editions ==
- 2001. ISBN 0-06-621244-8. Ecco, HarperCollins, New York.
- 2001. ISBN 0-571-20547-X. Faber and Faber Limited, London.
- 2002. ISBN 0-06-093664-9. Paperback. Ecco, HarperCollins, New York.
