= Reginald Goff =

British judge

The Right Honourable Sir Reginald Goff

Lord Justice of Appeal
- In office 1975 – 17 January 1980

Justice of the High Court
- In office 1965–1975

Personal details
- Born: 22 March 1907
- Died: 17 January 1980 (aged 72)
- Spouse: Marjorie Morwenna Curnow
- Children: 2
- Education: King's College, London; University College, London

Sir Reginald William Goff, PC (22 March 1907 – 17 January 1980) was a British judge. He was a Lord Justice of Appeal between 1975 and his death in 1980, when he was known as Lord Justice Goff.

== Biography ==
The son of William Kingsley Goff and Louisa Goff, Reginald Goff was educated at Sutton County Grammar School, King's College London (Fellow, 1970) and University College London (Fellow, 1968). He took an LL.B. with first-class honours in 1928, and won the Certificate of Honour in the Bar examination the same year. He was called to the bar by Lincoln's Inn in 1929 (Bencher, 1959; Treasurer, 1974). During the Second World War, he served in the Auxiliary Fire Service until 1942, then in the Royal Air Force until 1946; he was an assistant judge advocate general from 1945 to 1946.

Goff was appointed a Queen's Counsel in 1953 and was elected to the General Council of the Bar in 1958. He was appointed a Justice of the High Court in 1965 and received the customary knighthood, and was assigned to the Chancery Division. On the High Court bench, he was judicially known as Mr Justice Goff. He was appointed a Lord Justice of Appeal in 1975 and was sworn of the Privy Council.

Goff died on 17 January 1980; the next day, his judgment in McIlkenny v Chief Constable of the West Midlands [1980] QB 283, a case concerning the Birmingham Six, was read out in court by Sir George Baker.

Goff is sometimes confused with the better-known Robert Goff, Baron Goff of Chieveley, who was a Lord Justice of Appeal between 1982 and 1986, and who was known judicially as Mr Justice Robert Goff and Lord Justice Robert Goff. See the judgment of Lord Scott of Foscote in Cobbe v Yeoman's Row Management Ltd [2008] UKHL 55, at [24].

== Family ==
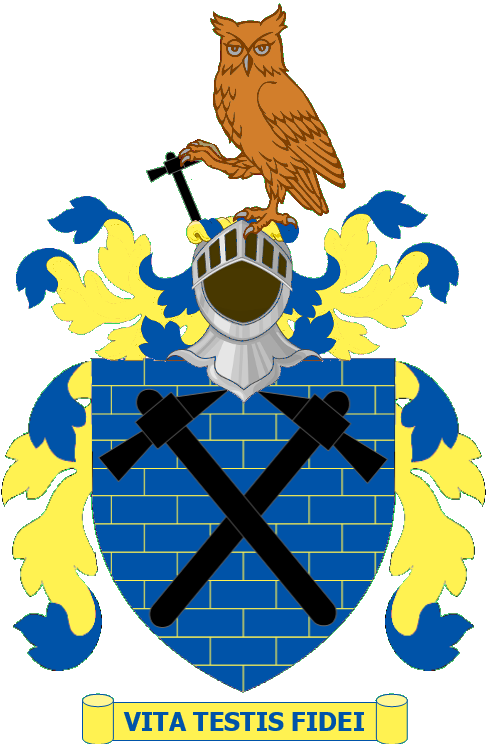
Arms displayed at Lincoln's Inn

Goff married in 1944 Marjorie Morwenna Curnow, daughter of the Rev. A. Garfield Curnow; they had two daughters.

== Notable cases ==
- Re Gulbenkian's Settlements Trusts - overturned on appeal
- Re Denley's Trust Deed [1969] 1 Ch 373
- Re West Sussex Constabulary's Widows, Children and Benevolent (1930) Fund Trusts [1971] Ch 1
- Aluminium Industrie Vaassen BV v Romalpa Aluminium Ltd [1976] 1 WLR 676
- DHN Food Distributors Ltd v Tower Hamlets LBC [1976] 1 WLR 852
- Daulia Ltd v Four Millbank Nominees Ltd [1978] Ch 231
- Re Osoba [1979] 1 WLR 247
- Re Gray's Inn Construction Co Ltd [1980] 1 WLR 711
- Belmont Finance Corp Ltd v Williams Furniture Ltd (No 2) [1980] 1 All ER 393
- Stonegate Securities Ltd v Gregory [1980] Ch 576

== Sources ==
- The Times, 18 January 1980
- The Daily Telegraph, 18 January 1980
