= Re Osoba =

British legal case

- Court: Court of Appeal
- Citations: [1978] EWCA Civ 3, [1979] 1 WLR 247, [1979] 2 All ER 393

Keywords
- Trusts

Re Osoba [1978] EWCA Civ 3 is an English trusts law case, concerning the construction of a trust to benefit people, rather than a purpose.

== Facts ==
Mr. Patrick Osoba had left his wife and family property in Nigeria and elsewhere. It was given to his wife "for her maintenance and for the training of my daughter, Abiola, up to university grade and for the maintenance of my aged mother". It was argued by a son from another marriage that the trust for the daughter was invalid, since it could be regarded as only being for a purpose.

In the High Court, Megarry VC held that the true construction was that the money was held on trust for the wife, daughter and mother, absolutely as joint tenants.

== Judgment ==
Goff LJ upheld the High Court on the main point that the property was given to the daughter on trust absolutely, so nothing resulted to the testator’s estate. Buckley LJ concurred and said the following.

If a testator has given the whole of a fund, whether of capital or income, to a beneficiary, whether directly or through the medium of a trustee, he is regarded, in the absence of any contra indication, as having manifested an intention to benefit that person to the full extent of the subject matter, notwithstanding that he may have expressly stated that the gift is made for a particular purpose, which may prove to be impossible of performance or which may not exhaust the subject matter. This is because the testator has given the whole fund; he has not given so much of the fund as will suffice or be required to achieve the purpose, nor so much of the fund as a trustee or anyone else should determine, but the whole fund. This must be reconciled with the testator's having specified the purpose for which the gift is made. This reconciliation is achieved by treating the reference to the purpose as merely a statement of the testator's motive in making the gift. Any other interpretation of the gift would frustrate the testator's expressed intention that the whole subject matter shall be applied for the benefit of the beneficiary. These considerations have, I think, added force where the subject matter is the testator's residue, so that any failure of the gift would result in intestacy.

Eveleigh LJ concurred.

== See also ==
- English trust law
