= Cambridge University Moral Sciences Club =

Philosophical discussion group

Moral Sciences Club
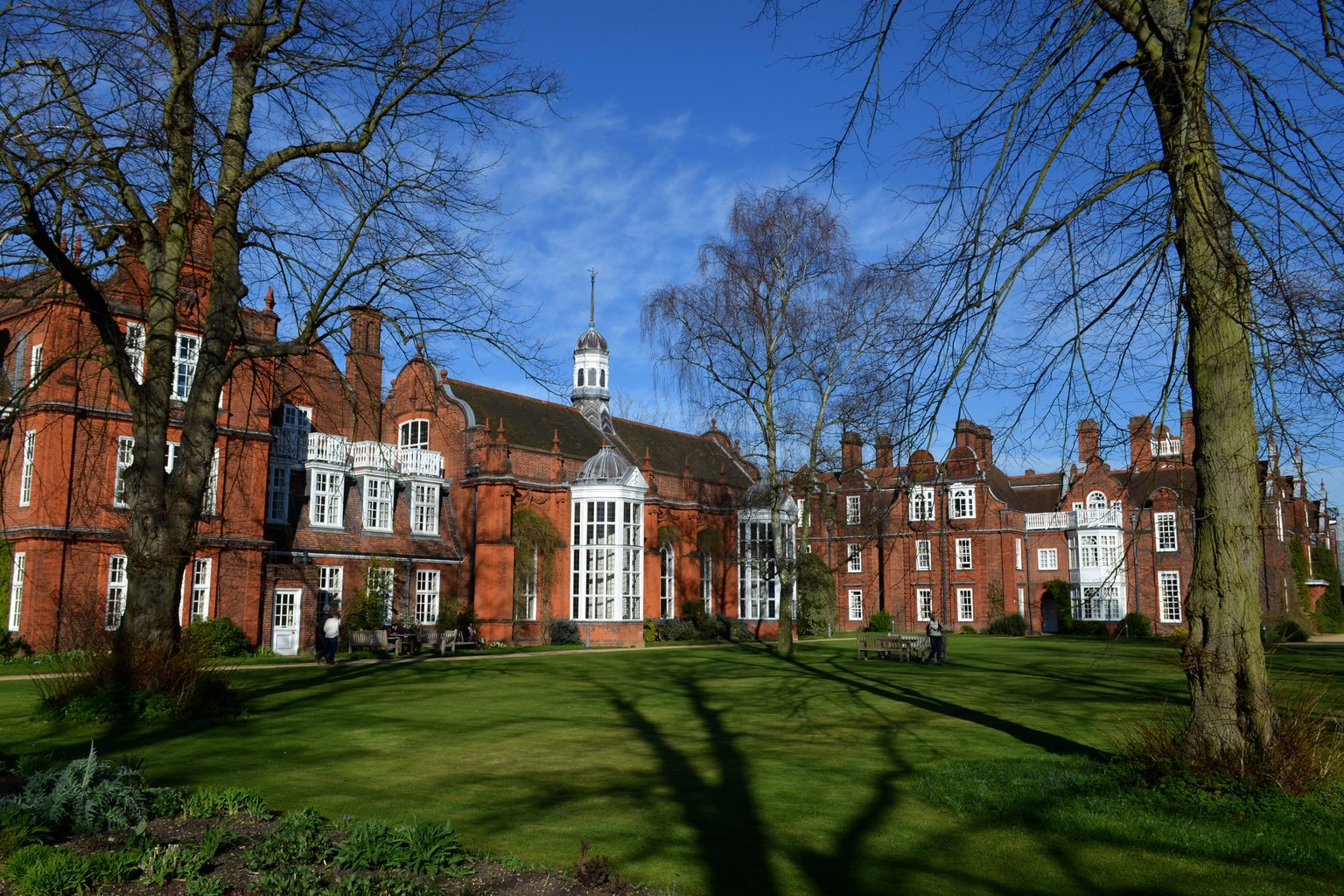
- The club has met at Newnham College since 2014.
- Founded: First recorded meeting 19 October 1878 at Trinity
- Purpose: Philosophy
- Location: University of Cambridge
- Website: The Moral Sciences Club

The Cambridge University Moral Sciences Club, founded in October 1878, is a philosophy discussion group that meets weekly at the University of Cambridge during term time. Speakers are invited to present a paper with a strict upper time limit of 45 minutes, after which there is discussion for an hour. Several Colleges have hosted the Club: Trinity College, King's College, Clare College, Darwin College, St John's College, and from 2014 Newnham College.

The club has been highly influential in analytic philosophy because of the concentration of philosophers at Cambridge. Members have included many of British philosophy's top names, such as Henry Sidgwick, J.M.E. McTaggart, Bertrand Russell, G.E. Moore, and Ludwig Wittgenstein, and several papers regarded as founding documents of various schools of thoughts had their first airing at a club meeting. Moore's "The Nature of Judgment" was first read to the club on 21 October 1898. "Knowledge by acquaintance and knowledge by description" was presented to a meeting in 1911, and in 1926 what became Frank Ramsey’s Truth and Probability. Russell's "Limits of Empiricism" was read in the Michaelmas term of 1935, Friedrich Hayek's "The Facts of the Social Sciences" was read in the Michaelmas term of 1942, and Moore's paradox was first read in Michaelmas 1944. Almost every major anglophone philosopher since the Second World War has delivered a paper to the club.

It was during a meeting of the Moral Sciences Club in October 1946 that Wittgenstein famously waved a poker at Sir Karl Popper during a heated discussion about whether philosophical problems are real or just linguistic games.

== History ==
=== Origins ===
The club originally emerged from the Grote Society in 1874, but it lasted only two years. In 1878, another group decided to revive it, led by Alfred Caldecott —later professor of logic and mental philosophy at King's College London—when he was a third-year undergraduate at John's. They used the same name, and regular meetings began on 19 October 1878, consisting of Caldecott; Joseph Jacobs, later founder of the Jewish Historical Society and a friend of George Eliot; and Alfred Momerie, who also became a professor of logic at King's College London. It was decided that meetings would take place each Saturday in term time at nine in the evening, with membership restricted to those who had taken or were reading for the moral sciences tripos. The first recorded club paper was "Development Theories of Conscience," read by T.E. Scrutton of Trinity College on 26 October that year.

=== Cambridge Apostles ===
Jack Pitt infers from the decision to meet on Saturdays that none of the original members were Apostles, the secret Cambridge debating society that had been meeting on Saturdays since it was formed in 1820. The day of the club meeting was changed to Friday in 1885, when Henry Sidgwick was president, which allowed the Apostles to attend club meetings, and vice versa. Sidgwick was already an Apostle and J.M.E. McTaggart became both club secretary and an Apostle in 1886. Several other Apostles joined the club over the years—including Bertrand Russell, John Maynard Keynes, A.N. Whitehead, G. Lowes Dickinson, G.H. Hardy, Crompton Llewelyn Davies, C.P. Sanger, A.E.A.W. Smyth, and H.T. Norton—and several Apostles after Sidgwick and McTaggart became officers of the club, including G.E. Moore and Ludwig Wittgenstein.

== Women ==
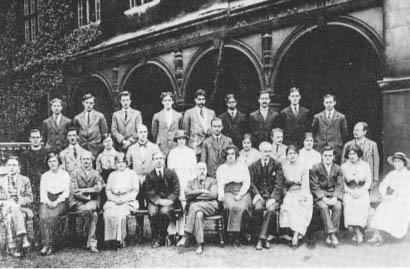
Members of the Moral Science Club, Cambridge, c. 1913. In the front row, third from left, is James Ward; to the right of him, Bertrand Russell; next to Russell is W. E. Johnson; in the second row, on the far right, is McTaggart; and third from the right, G. E. Moore

Women were never formally restricted from membership, but because women were not allowed to take the tripos examinations until 1881 and were not granted full membership of the university with the right to obtain degrees until 1947, the club was mostly a male affair in its early days. The first record of women even listening to papers was in Michaelmas 1894, when Sidney Webb read "The Economic Basis of Trade Unionism," and the audience included his wife Beatrice Webb and two women from Girton College, a women's college. The first woman to read a paper was Emily Elizabeth Constance Jones, who spoke about James Ward's Naturalism and Agnosticism on 1 December 1899 in McTaggart's rooms. Sidgwick was in the chair, which Jack Pitt writes was significant, because he had been at the forefront of the campaign to admit women to the university, and his wife, Eleanor Mildred Balfour, had become president of Newnham College, another women's college, in 1892.

In 1906, the club minutes make clear that women were still not fully accepted at the club for at least some time: "after the lady visitors departed the following were elected members of the Club," and no women were among those listed. There were five women members from Newnham in 1908 and in 1912 six from Newnham and five from Girton. Dorothy Wrinch read a paper on 7 December 1917 about "Mr Russell's Theory of Judgment," which Pitt writes was probably the same paper she had published in Mind in 1919 as On the Nature of Judgment. By 1926, there were woman officers, including Elsie Whetnall, the club secretary, and later G.E.M. (Elizabeth) Anscombe, who continued to speak to the club until at least the 1980s.

== Wittgenstein ==
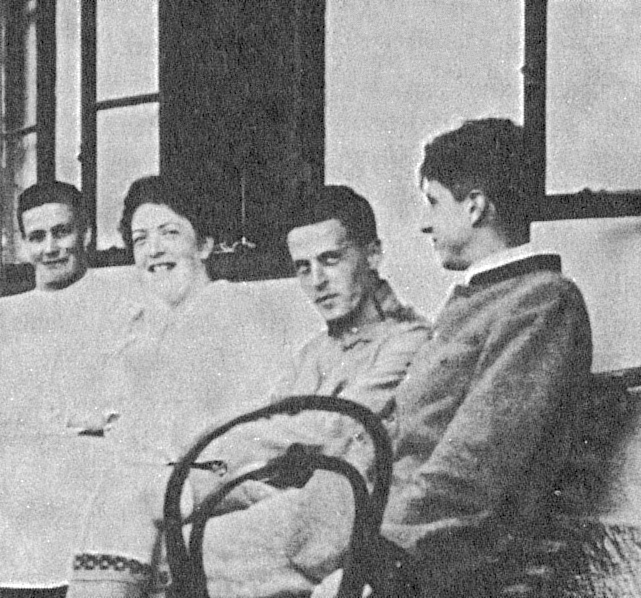
Wittgenstein (second from right) in 1920

Wittgenstein arrived in Cambridge in 1911 and became a member of the club in 1912, when he suggested that no paper last more than seven minutes, a rule adopted on 15 November 1912, though soon abandoned. He gave his first paper on 29 November that year, called "What is philosophy?", at a meeting in his rooms at Trinity. Fifteen members were present, including G.E. Moore. The minutes record:

Mr Wittgenstein ... read a paper entitled "What is Philosophy?" The paper lasted only about 4 minutes, thus cutting the previous record established by Mr Tye by nearly two minutes. Philosophy was defined as all those primitive propositions which are assumed as true without proof by the various sciences. This defn. was much discussed but there was no general disposition to adopt it. The discussion was kept very well to the point, and the Chairman did not find it necessary to intervene much.

Minutes of the poker-waving meeting

He left Cambridge in 1913, but returned in January 1929 and started attended meetings again, but he was an intense man and was accused of dominating discussion, which led him to break off his relationship with the club for a few years in 1931. Another member, Fania Pascal, wrote that he was the disturbing centre of the evenings. "He would talk for long periods without interruption, using similes and allegories, stalking about the room and gesticulating. He cast a spell."

His dominance of the Moral Sciences Club reached its height in October 1946 during a meeting that is now legendary among philosophers. It was on 25 October in Richard Braithwaite's rooms in the Gibbs building at King's (room three on the first floor of staircase H). A confrontation arose between Wittgenstein, who was chairing the meeting, and the evening's guest speaker, Karl Popper, Reader in Logic and Scientific Method at the London School of Economics. The meeting had been organized by Wasfi Hijab, the club secretary, and was attended by 30 philosophers—dons and students—including Peter Geach, Peter Gray-Lucas, A.C. Ewing, Georg Kreisel, Peter Munz, Stephen Plaister, Bertrand Russell, Stephen Toulmin, John Vinelott, and Michael Wolff. It was reportedly the only time Popper, Russell, and Wittgenstein—three of the world's most eminent philosophers at the time—were ever together.

Popper was reading "Are there philosophical problems?" and an argument broke out about the nature of philosophy: whether philosophical problems were real, which was Popper's position, or just linguistic puzzles, which was Wittgenstein's. The pair almost came to blows, with Wittgenstein pointing Braithwaite's reportedly red-hot poker at Popper, demanding that he give an example of a moral rule. Popper offered one: "Not to threaten visiting speakers with pokers," at which point Wittgenstein stormed out in a huff. The minutes make no mention of the poker incident, recording only that, "The meeting was charged to an unusual degree with a spirit of controversy":

Second meeting Oct 26th, 1946

Dr K.R. Popper, Methods in Philosophy
In Mr. Braithwaite's Rooms at King's

In the first part of his paper Dr Popper explained how he chose this topic as a consequence of his astonishment and surprise at the Secretary's letter of invitation*, which made use of such expressions as "a short paper," "open a discussion," "state a philosophical puzzle" etc, which reflected a different view from his own as to what philosophy is. He went on to describe this philosophy and its origins, giving it the label "Linguistic Philosophy" (Wittgenstein and his "school"). He considers the advent of this school an epoch in philosophy, but he would criticize it very strongly on several points. Thus while it occupies itself with "preliminaries" it claims exclusiveness to the title of "philosophy" and never goes beyond these "preliminaries" to the more important problems of philosophy. After all, one knows what he means by his philosophical question and the important thing is to provide the "true answer" for it. It also cultivates "esotericism."

In discussion, however, it turned out that to give an example of the "beyond the preliminaries" problem is a difficult task which calls for both labour and time. The examples which Dr Popper eventually suggested seemed to some of the audience to be no more than problems in pure maths or Sociology. The meeting was charged to an unusual degree with a spirit of controversy.

Prof. Wittgenstein was in the chair.

^{*}It is the Club's form of invitation. Wasfi Hijab, Secretary
