= Re Recher's Will Trusts =

- Court: High Court
- Citation: [1972] Ch 526

Keywords
- Certainty, express trusts

Re Recher's Will Trusts [1972] Ch 526 is an English trusts law case, concerning the policy of the beneficiary principle and unincorporated associations.

== Facts ==
The testator's will on 23 May 1957 gave some of the residual estate to the Anti-Vivisection Society, at 76 Victoria St, SW1, which was construed as being 'the London and Provincial Anti-Vivisection Society'. But this had wound up on 1 January 1957 and amalgamated into The National Anti-Vivisection Society of 27 Palace Street, SW1. Neither were charities. She died in 1962.

== Judgment ==
Brightman J held that the gifts had failed. They could not be construed as one to the new National Society, only the previous one. If it had still existed, it would have been a gift to the members beneficially, subject to their association contract. Yet because it had ended, nor "saving words", words of trust, there was no such gift to the members. He asked whether the gift would have been valid if the unincorporated association had indeed existed at all at the time. The rules of the society did not purport to create any trusts. He said:

the life members, the ordinary members and the associate members of the London Provincial Society were bound together by a contract inter se. Any such member was entitled to the rights and subject to the liabilities defined by the rules. If the committee acted contrary to the rules, an individual member would be entitled to take proceedings in the courts to compel observance of the rules or to recover damages for any loss he had suffered as a result of the breach of contract. ...

Just as the two parties to a bipartite bargain can vary or terminate their contract by mutual assent, so it must follow that the life members, ordinary members and associate members of the London and Provincial Society could, at any moment of time, by unanimous agreement (or by majority vote if the rules so prescribe), vary or terminate their multipartite contract. There would be no limit to the type of variation or termination to which all might agree. There is no private trust or trust for charitable purposes or other trust to hinder the process. So they could wind up and no one would have locus standi to stop it. The contract is the same as any other contract and concerns only those who are parties to it, that is to say, the members of the society. ...

In the case of a donation which is not accompanied by any words which purport to impose a trust, it seems to me that the gift takes effect in favour of the existing members of the association as an accretion to the funds which are the subject-matter of the contract which such members have made inter se, and falls to be dealt with in precisely the same way as the funds which the members themselves have subscribed. So, in the case of a legacy. In the absence of words which purport to impose a trust, the legacy is a gift to the members beneficially, not as joint tenants or as tenants in common so as to entitle each member to an immediate distributive share, but as an accretion to the funds which are the subject-matter of the contract which the members have made inter se.

== See also ==
- English trusts law
