= Hanchett-Stamford v Attorney-General =

English trusts law case on unincorporated associations

Hanchett‐Stamford v Attorney‐General
- Court: High Court
- Citations: [2008] EWHC 330 (Ch), [2009] Ch 173

Court membership
- Judge sitting: Lewison J

Keywords
- Contract, unincorporated association, beneficiary principle

Hanchett‐Stamford v Attorney‐General [2008] EWHC 330 (Ch) is an English trusts law case, concerning the destination of property that is held by unincorporated associations when they wind up. The High Court applied the view that while the association exists, assets are held jointly by the members but according to the terms of the association contract, and when the association ends any surplus funds go to those who were members of the association at the moment of its dissolution. (In the particular case, one sole member survived.)

== Facts ==
The Performing and Captive Animals Defence League was founded as an unincorporated association in 1914, with the purpose of banning animals performing. It was decided the league had no charitable status in 1949, after National Anti-Vivisection Society v IRC, because it was meant to change the law. Mr and Mrs Hanchett-Stamford joined as life members in the mid-1960s; he died in 2006 and she was the sole surviving member of the society. She decided to wind up and give the money to an active animal charity, seeking a declaration that the work and objects of the league were charitable under the Charities Act 2006 section 2(2)(k) and appointed herself and her solicitor as trustees of the fund, or just take the money herself.

== Judgment ==
Lewison J held the society was not charitable within the legal definition. However, he held that on her husband's death the league ceased to exist, the rules ceased to bind her, and she was absolutely entitled to the assets as the sole surviving member. He held there was no need, in fact, to invoke a new form of co-ownership. Rather the association, while it lasted, was "a species of joint tenancy":

It is true that this is not a joint tenancy according to the classical model; but since any collective ownership of property must be a species of joint tenancy or tenancy in common this kind of collective ownership must, in my judgment, be a sub-species of joint tenancy, albeit taking effect subject to any contractual restrictions applicable as between members.

The donor transfers property to the members beneficially, but the property is received by the members as group property, as an accretion to an association's funds. This means its use is to be governed by contract, and the contract in almost all cases prevents severance of a member's share.

== See also ==
- English trust law
