= Leahy v Attorney-General (NSW) =

Judgement of the High Court of Australia

Attorney-General (NSW) v Donnelly
- Court: High Court of Australia
- Decided: 11 March 1958
- Citations: [1958] HCA 1, (1958) 98 CLR 538]

Case history
- Prior actions: Supreme Court of NSW per Myers J, "Reasons for judgment" (PDF). 11 April 1957. pp. 34–44.

Court membership
- Judges sitting: Dixon CJ, McTiernan, Williams, Webb and Kitto JJ

Leahy v Attorney-General (NSW)
- Court: Privy Council
- Decided: 20 April 1959
- Citations: [1959] UKPC 9, [1959] AC 457; [1959] UKPCHCA 3, (1959) 101 CLR 611

Court membership
- Judges sitting: Viscount Simonds Lord Morton of Henryton Lord Cohen Lord Somervell of Harrow and Lord Denning

Leahy v Attorney-General for New South Wales is an Australian and English trusts law case involving a charitable trust, heard by the High Court of Australia in 1958, and the Privy Council in 1959. The proceeding concerned the validity a gift to an unincorporated body, concluding that gifts in trust "cannot be made to a purpose or to an object" except for charitable circumstances.

== Background ==
At the heart of the case was the rule against perpetuities, which is a common law rule that "no interest is good unless it must vest, if at all, not later than twenty-one years after some life in being at the creation of the interest". The rule against perpetuities does not apply to trusts that are purely charitable, or more accurately, to an immediate gift of capital to a charity, even though the trust may last forever. A gift to an identified class that contained both charitable and non-charitable bodies would be subject to the rule against perpetuities.

The effect of the common law rule was modified in NSW by section 37D of the Conveyancing Act which provided:

(1) No trust shall be held to be invalid by reason that some non-charitable and invalid purpose as well as some charitable purpose is or could be deemed to be included in any of the purposes to or for which an application of the trust funds or any part thereof is by such trust directed or allowed.
(2) Any such trust shall be construed and given effect to in the same manner in all respects as if no application of the trust funds or of any part thereof to or for any such non-charitable and invalid purpose had been or could be deemed to have been so directed or allowed.

A requirement for a charitable trust was that it must be for the benefit of the public. Gifts for religious purposes will only be charitable if they are to benefit the public and not merely the members of a religious group.

=== Facts ===
Francis Leahy was a wealthy Australian grazier who died in 1955 leaving a widow, Doris Leahy and 7 children. His estate was valued at A£348,000, comprising several grazing properties and a block of flats in Goulburn. Doris Leahy was left a life interest in one of the flats and specific bequests were made for some of the children. The majority of the estate was left upon trusts for various catholic orders. Clause 3 gave the trustees the discretion to select an "Order of Nuns of the Catholic Church or the Christian Brothers". Clause 5 provided that the residue was to be used for a convent for an order of nuns selected by the trustees. The executors, Donnelly, Wright and Mullen, sought the guidance of the Supreme Court of NSW whether these provisions of the will were void for uncertainty. The respondents to the application were Doris Leahy, the 7 children and the Attorney-General of NSW, (Note: One of the prerogative powers of the Attorney General is the protector of all property subject to charitable trusts:)

=== Supreme Court of NSW ===
In the Supreme Court, Myers J, upheld the validity of clause 3, holding that the selection of an order of nuns or the Christian Brothers was an immediate gift in favour of the body selected or its members, regardless of whether it was for a charitable purpose. The trust established by clause 5 was a perpetuity and thus it was void unless its purposes were charitable. Myers J held it was possible to identify every order of nuns falling within the class, however some orders of nuns were charitable, while others were not. Because the will did not set out a charitable intent, it was not saved by s 37D of the Conveyancing Act, and accordingly the trust for the residue was void.

== High Court ==
The Attorney-General appealed to the High Court against the decision that the trust for the residue in clause 5 was void, whilst Doris Leahy and the 7 children appealed against the decision that bequest to an order of nuns or the Christian Brothers in clause 3 was valid.

The High Court upheld the validity of both clauses. Williams, Webb and Kitto JJ held that Myers J was correct in deciding that clause 3 was valid as being an immediate gift in favour of the body selected. They upheld the appeal on clause 5 holding that the trust for the residue was saved by s37D.

Dixon CJ and McTiernan J held that both clauses would have been invalid however they were saved by s37D, holding that while the class was not exclusively charitable, it was predominately charitable in character. the effect of which was to exclude any non-charitable purpose & turn it into a wholly charitable trust.

== Advice of the Privy Council ==
Doris Leahy and the 7 children were granted leave to appeal to the Privy Council. At the time there was no provision for dissent or separate judgments in the Privy Council. Instead the advice to the Queen was determined by a majority of judges who heard the appeal and one judge would be chosen to write the judgment. Decisions of the Privy Council tended to be expressed on narrow grounds, a tendency attributed to the need to reflect the agreement of the majority of judges. Viscount Simonds delivered the judgment of the Privy Council.

The Privy Council affirmed the decision of the High Court, in part of different grounds. The Privy Council agreed with the decision of the High Court that clause 5 was invalid as a perpetuity but was saved by s 37D. A gift to the orders of nuns was an object so predominantly charitable that it was fair to assume the testator had a charitable intention.

In relation to clause 3 the Privy Council noted the "artificial and anomalous conception of an unincorporated society which, though it is not a separate entity in law, is yet for many purposes regarded as a continuing entity and, however inaccurately, as something other than an aggregate of its members".

The Privy Council held that clause 3 was not a gift to the individual members as the beneficial owners of the property. Instead clause 3 created "a trust not merely for the benefit of the existing members of the selected order but for its benefit as a continuing society and for the furtherance of its work" for the reasons that :

1. the bequest was expressed as being made to the order of nuns, rather than to any specified individuals;
2. the members of the selected order may be very large, such that it was not easy to believe the testator intended to benefit the members of the order personally; and
3. The testator could not have intended that the right of "immediate possession" over a homestead with 20 rooms could have been exercised by all the nuns in the order.

Clause 3 created a trust for the benefit of the people who would become members of selected order of nuns or Christian Brothers in the future. Because the orders of nuns included bodies who had a religious rather than charitable purpose the trust offended the rule against perpetuities. The Privy Council agreed with Dixon CJ and McTiernan J that the validity of the gift was saved by s 37D of the Conveyancing Act.

== Significance ==
The decision is commonly referenced in modern Australian law when dealing with issues surrounding bequests, gifts and the ability to contract of unincorporated associations.

The effect of excluding closed or contemplative religious orders was affected in Australia by the extension of the definition of a charity in 2003, to include non-profit public child care; self-help bodies with open and non-discriminatory membership; and closed or contemplative religious orders offering prayerful public intervention.

== See also ==
- English trusts law
- Purpose trust
