= Morice v Bishop of Durham =

1805 English trusts law case

- Court: High Court of Chancery
- Citation: [1805] EWHC Ch J80; (1805) 10 Ves 522

Case history
- Prior action: (1804) 9 Ves 399

Case opinions
- Lord Eldon

Keywords
- Certainty, express trusts

Morice v Bishop of Durham [1805] EWHC Ch J80 is an English trusts law case, concerning the policy of the beneficiary principle.

== Facts ==
General Mordaunt Cracherode (died 20 June 1773, or in 1768 by some accounts) was appointed Lieutenant Governor of Fort St. Philip, Menorca, in 1753 and as a lieutenant-colonel was commanding officer of the marines during George Anson's voyage round the world.

His son, Clayton Mordaunt Cracherode, was an important benefactor to the British Museum. Despite leaving them his large collections of books, prints and other artworks, his home-made will left his sister Ann his land and residual fortune; she was then 79, and without children or close relations. Clayton's friend, Shute Barrington, Bishop of Durham descended upon her, and after exercising what many later felt was undue influence, persuaded her to make a new will, in which he was named sole executor, with wide power over the disposition of the funds. After bequests, some £30,000 was left for the executor to spend on "such objects of benevolence and liberality as the trustee in his own discretion shall most approve of" – perhaps equating to £2.1 million in modern terms. After Ann died in 1802 the will led to the case being litigated when her cousins Anne and William Morice sued to overturn the will. William had already been bequeathed £16,000 in the will.

The key legal point was that "The testator purported to make a trust for such objects of benevolence and liberality as the trustee in his own discretion shall most approve of."

== Judgment ==
=== Court of Chancery ===
Sir William Grant held that the will could not amount to a charity, and so the money had to return to the next of kin.

There can be no trust, over the exercise of which this Court will not assume a control; for an uncontrollable power of disposition would be ownership, and not trust. If there be a clear trust, but for uncertain objects, the property, that is the subject of the trust, is undisposed of, and the benefit of such trust must result to those, to whom the law gives the ownership in default of disposition by the former owner. But this doctrine does not hold good with regard to trusts for charity. Every other trust must have a definite object. There must be somebody, in whose favour the Court can decree performance. But it is now settled, upon authority, which it is too late to controvert, that, where a charitable purpose is expressed, however general, the bequest shall not fail on account of the uncertainty of the object: but the particular mode of application will be directed by the King in some cases, in others by this Court.

=== High Court of Chancery ===
Lord Eldon LC, on appeal, also found that the trust could neither be valid as a private trust, because it lacked beneficiaries.

As it is a maxim, that the execution of a trust shall be under the control of the court, it must be of such a nature, that it can be under that control; so that the administration of it can be reviewed by the court; or, if the trustee dies, the court itself can execute the trust: a trust therefore, which, in case of mal-administration could be reformed; and a due administration directed; and then, unless the subject and the objects can be ascertained, upon principles, familiar in other cases, it must be decided, that the court can neither reform maladministration, nor direct a due administration. That is the principle of that case. Upon the question, whether that principle was well applied in that instance, different minds will reason differently. I should have been disposed to say, that, where such a purpose was expressed, it was not a strained construction to hold, that the happiness of mankind intended was that, which was to be promoted by the circulation of religious and virtuous learning: and, the testator having stated that to be the charitable purpose, which unquestionably was so, the distribution of books for the promotion of religion, the Court might have so understood him; and the testator having not only called it a charitable purpose, but delegated the execution to this Court, ought to be taken to have meant that.

... there is no magic in words; and if the real meaning of these words is charity or charitable purposes, according to the technical sense, in which those words are used in this Court, all the consequences follow: if on the other hand the intention was to describe any thing beyond that, then the testator meant to repose in the Bishop a discretion, not to apply the property for his own benefit, but that would enable him to apply it to purposes more indefinite than those, to which we must look; considering them purposes, creating a trust; for, if there is as much of indefinite nature in the purposes, intended to be expressed, as in the cases, to which I first alluded, where the objects are too uncertain to make recommendation amount to trust, by analogy, the trust is as ineffectual: the only difference being, that in the one case no trust is declared; and the recommendation fails; the objects being too indefinite: in the other, the testator has expressly said, it is a trust; and the trustee consequently takes, not for his own benefit, but for purposes not sufficiently defined to be controlled and managed by this Court. Upon these words much criticism may be used. But the question is, whether, according to the ordinary sense, not the sense of the passages and authors alluded to, treating upon the great and extensive sense of the word "charity", in the Christian religion, this testatrix meant by these words to confine the Defendant to such acts of charity or charitable purposes as this Court would have enforced by decree, and reference to a Master. I do not think, that was the intention; and, if not, the intention is too indefinite to create a trust. But it was the intention to create a trust; and the object being too indefinite, has failed. The consequence of Law is, that the Bishop takes the property upon trust to dispose of it, as the Law will dispose of it: not for his own benefit, or any purpose this Court can effectuate. I think, therefore, this decree is right.

== See also ==
- English trusts law
