= Re Denley's Trust Deed =

Re Denley’s Trust Deed
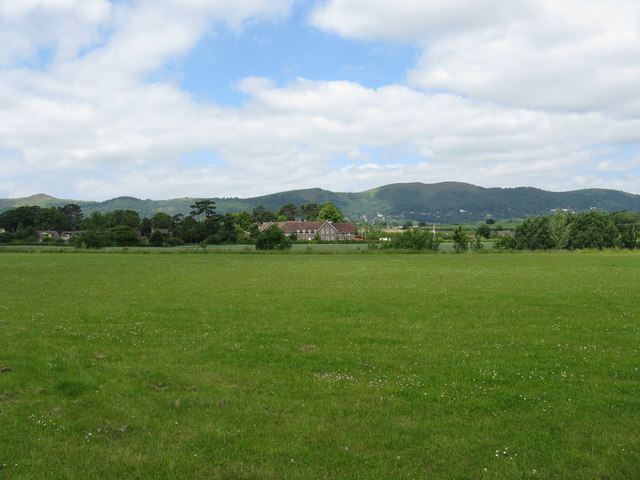
- Court: High Court
- Citation: [1969] 1 Ch 373

Keywords
- Certainty, express trusts

Re Denley's Trust Deed [1969] 1 Ch 373 is an English trusts law case, concerning the policy of the "beneficiary principle". It held that so long as the people benefitting from a trust can at least be said to have a direct and tangible interest, so as to have the locus standi to enforce a trust, it would be valid.

== Facts ==
In 1936 the settlor company, H.H. Martyn & Co. Ltd, from Sunningend Works, Cheltenham, transferred land to trustees to, under clause 2(c), "be maintained and used as and for the purpose of a recreation or sports ground primarily for the benefit of the employees of the company and secondarily for the benefit of such other person or persons (if any) as the trustees may allow to use the same". Clause 2(j) added that the employees would cease entitlement if the number dropped below 75% of them "or if the said land shall at any time cease to be required or to be used by the said employees as a sports ground or if the company shall go into liquidation then the trustees shall ... convey the said land to the General Hospital Cheltenham or as it shall direct." It was argued that this was a non-charitable purpose trust and should fall foul of the beneficiary principle.

The claimants were the trustees. The first defendant was the company, who argued clause 2(j) was void for uncertainty, and if not clause 2(c) was also void, and hence the property would be on resulting trust to the company. The second defendant was an employee representing the others, who argued that clause 2(c) is valid, and if not then clause 2(j) would be void. The third defendants was the Cheltenham Group Hospital Management Committee, which under the National Health Service Act 1946 was successor to the assets of the Cheltenham General Hospital, argued that clause 2(c) is void, and that clause 2(j) is valid, so that they would get the grounds.

== Judgment ==
Goff J held that the trust was valid, because it could be construed as being ultimately for the benefit of people and thus made to work. He said the following.

I think there may be a purpose or object trust, the carrying out of which would benefit an individual or individuals, where that benefit is so indirect or intangible or which is otherwise so framed as not to give those persons any locus standi to apply to the court to enforce the trust, in which case the beneficiary principle would, as it seems to me, apply to invalidate the trust, quite apart from any question of uncertainty or perpetuity. Such cases can be considered if and when they arise. The present is not, in my judgment, of that character, and it will be seen that clause 2 (d) of the trust deed expressly states that, subject to any rules and regulations made by the trustees, the employees of the company shall be entitled to the use and enjoyment of the land. Apart from this possible exception, in my judgment the beneficiary principle of In re Astor's Settlement Trusts. which was approved in In re Endacott, decd. - see particularly by Harman L.J. - is confined to purpose or object trusts which are abstract or impersonal. The objection is not that the trust is for a purpose or object per se, but that there is no beneficiary or cestui que trust. The rule is so expressed in Lewin on Trusts, 16th ed. (1964), p. 17, and, in my judgment, with the possible exception I have mentioned, rightly so. In In re Wood, decd., Harman J. said 36:

There has been an interesting argument on the question of perpetuity, but it seems to me, with all respect to that argument, that there is an earlier obstacle which is fatal to the validity of this bequest, namely, that a gift on trust must have a cestui que trust, and there being here no cestui que trust the gift must fail.

Again, in Leahy v Attorney-General for New South Wales Viscount Simonds, delivering the judgment of the Privy Council, said:

A gift can be made to persons (including a corporation) but it cannot be made to a purpose or to an object: so also," - and these are the important words - "a trust may be created for the benefit of persons as cestuis que trust but not for a purpose or object unless the purpose or object be charitable. For a purpose or object cannot sue, but, if it be charitable, the Attorney-General can sue to enforce it.

Where, then, the trust, though expressed as a purpose, is directly or indirectly for the benefit of an individual or individuals, it seems to me that it is in general outside the mischief of the beneficiary principle.

Goff J applied the list certainty test from IRC v Broadway Cottages Trust [1955] Ch 20, although this would now be superseded given McPhail v Doulton.

== See also ==
- English trusts law
