= Beneficiary principle =

Policy of English trusts law

The beneficiary principle is a policy of English trusts law, and trusts in Commonwealth jurisdictions, that trusts which do not have charitable objects, as under the UK Charities Act 2006 sections 2 and 3, and also do not make the trust property available for the benefit of defined people (i.e. beneficiaries), are void.

== Law ==
In Morice v Bishop of Durham it was said "every [non-charitable] trust must have a definite object. There must be someone in whose favour the court can decree performance." With a charitable trust, this power of enforcement is usually vested in the Attorney General. However, such conceptual objections seem less strong since the decision of the House of Lords in McPhail v Doulton [1971] AC 424 where Lord Wilberforce rode roughshod over objections to widening the class of valid discretionary trusts on the basis that there would be difficulty ascertaining beneficiaries for the court to enforce the trust in favour of.

Where the objects of a trust are a purpose rather than an individual or individuals, there is much greater risk that a trust would not be enforceable due to lack of certainty. Cases such as Morice v Bishop of Durham (1805) 9 Ves Jr 399 and Re Astor [1952] Ch 534 re-affirm the court's disinclination to enforce trusts that are not specific and detailed. The common law exceptions to the general prohibition on purposes trusts tend to relate to specific and detailed matters, such as maintenance of a specific tomb, or caring for a particular animal.

There are two exceptions to the rule. The first one is specific animals as seen in the case of Re Dean (1889) 41 Ch. D 552. The second exception is when the trust is created to build or maintain a tomb or a monument as in the case of Re Hooper [1932] 1 Ch 38. The problem is that these are very limited circumstances.

== United States ==
In various jurisdictions in the United States, the beneficiary principle has been abolished, so that a trust can be for a purpose, even if it is not charitable, and the courts will enforce it.

== See also ==
- English trusts law
