= Pine (disambiguation) =

A pine is any coniferous tree of the genus Pinus.

Pine may also refer to:

== Vegetation ==
- Species in the genus Araucaria including:
  - Araucaria angustifolia, Brazilian pine
  - Araucaria araucana, Chilean pine
  - Araucaria bidwillii, bunya pine
  - Araucaria heterophylla, Norfolk Island pine
- Species in the genus Athrotaxis including:
  - Athrotaxis cupressoides, pencil pine
  - Athrotaxis selaginoides, King Billy pine
- Lagarostrobos franklinii, Huon pine or Macquarie pine
- Nauclea orientalis, Leichhardt pine, in family Rubiaceae
- Neolamarckia cadamba, Leichhardt pine, in family Rubiaceae
- Screw pine, various species of plants in the genus Pandanus
- Wollemi pine, Wollemia nobilis, a coniferous tree
- Ground pine or running pine, certain species of clubmoss in the genus Diphasiastrum
- Pine, a generic term for any needled coniferous tree

== Places ==
=== Communities ===
All in the United States

- Pine, Arizona, an unincorporated community in Gila County
- Pine, California, former name of the incorporated town of Loomis in Placer County
- Pine, Colorado, an unincorporated community in Jefferson County
- Pine, Louisiana, an unincorporated community in Washington Parish
- Pine, Missouri, an unincorporated community in Ripley County
- Pine City (disambiguation), several places
- Pine Township (disambiguation), several places

=== Geography ===
May also include community names

- Pine Bluff (disambiguation) § Places, several places
  - Pine Bluff, Arkansas, the tenth-most populous city in Arkansas
- Pine Creek, several places
- Pine Hills, several places
- Pine Hills, several places
- Pine Mountain, several places
- Pine Ridge, several places
- Pine River § Places, several places
- Pine Valley, several places

=== Other ===
- Pine County, Minnesota, United States
- Pine Street, Seattle, Washington, United States

== People ==
=== Surname ===
- Arthur Pine (1917–2000), American publicist, literary agent, and writer
- Catherine Pine (1864–1941), Britain suffragette
- Chris Pine (born 1980), American actor
- Courtney Pine (born 1964), British jazz musician
- David Pine (diplomat), New Zealand ambassador to the Philippines during 2006–2008
- David Andrew Pine (1891–1970), United States district court judge
- Emilie Pine (born 1978), Irish novelist
- Gregory Pine (born 1988), American Dominican friar and theologian
- L. G. Pine (1907–1987), British writer, lecturer and researcher
- Nathan Pine, American collegiate athletic director
- Phoebe Paterson Pine (born 1997), British Paralympic archer
- Robert Pine (born 1941), American actor
- Seymour Pine (1919–2010), American deputy police inspector in New York City, known for his role in the raid on the Stonewall Inn
- Wilf Pine (1944–2018), English music manager, record producer and gangster

=== First name ===
- Pine Taiapa (1901–1972), New Zealand wood carver, farmer, and writer

=== Mononym ===
- Pine (gamer), professional name of South Korean Overwatch player Kim Do-hyeon

=== Fictional characters ===
- Albert M. Pine, full name of the fictional character Alpine from the G.I. Joe franchise

== Other uses ==
- Pine, an alternative name of the Bine language of Papua New Guinea
- "Pine", a song by Basement from their 2012 album Colourmeinkindness
- Pine (email client), email software developed by the University of Washington
- Pine (video game), an adventure game released in 2019

=== Acronyms ===
- PINE, acronym of "Pine Is Not Elm" (or variants thereof), see Pine (email client)
- PINE, acronym of People's Initiative of New England, an American white-supremacist organization

== See also ==
- Ground pine (disambiguation)
- Pines (disambiguation)
- Pinetree (disambiguation)
- Piney Winston, a fictional character on Sons of Anarchy
- Pyne, a surname
