= Pine Island =

Pine Island may refer to:

== Islands ==
=== Australia ===
- Pine Island Reserve, Australian Capital Territory

=== Canada ===
- Pine Island (Carp Lake, British Columbia), a small island in central British Columbia
- Pine Island (Ontario)
- Pine Island (Queen Charlotte Strait, British Columbia), a small island off northern Vancouver Island
- Pine Island Fort, an historic trading post on Pine Island, Saskatchewan, about 50 km east of Lloydminster

=== New Caledonia ===
- Pine Island (New Caledonia), also known as Isle of Pines

=== Spain ===
- Pine Islands, an alternate common (but informal) name for the Pityusic Islands, comprising the two main islands of Ibiza and Formentera and their surrounding islets

=== United States ===
- Pine Island (Lee County, Florida)
  - Pine Island Sound, Lee County, Florida
    - Pine Island National Wildlife Refuge
- Pine Island (Montana), an island in the Missouri River
- Pine Island (New Rochelle), in Westchester County, New York
- Pine Island (Lake Livingston), Texas

== Towns ==
- Pine Island, Florida (disambiguation), multiple places
  - Pine Island Center, Florida, in Lee County
  - Pine Island Ridge, Florida, in Broward county
- Pine Island, Minnesota, a small city in Goodhue County
  - Pine Island Township, Goodhue County, Minnesota near Pine Island
- Pine Island, New York
- Pine Island, South Carolina
- Pine Island, Texas

== Other ==
- Pine Island (horse) (2003–2006), American thoroughbred racehorse
- Pine Island Bay, Antarctica
- Pine Island Bridge on the Carolina Southern Railroad near Myrtle Beach, South Carolina, United States
- Pine Island Glacier, Antarctica
- USS Pine Island (AV-12), US Navy ship from World War II
