= Sinclair Investments (UK) Ltd v Versailles Trade Finance Ltd =

- Court: Court of Appeal
- Full case name: Sinclair Investments (UK) Ltd (Appellant) v Versailles Trade Finance Limited (in administrative receivership), Versailles Group Plc (in administrative receivership), National Westminster Bank Plc, Anthony V Lomas, Robert Birchall and Royal bank of Scotland Plc (Respondents and Cross-appellants)
- Decided: 29 March 2011
- Citations: [2011] EWCA Civ 347, [2011] 3 WLR 1153

Case history
- Prior actions: Sinclair Investments (UK) Ltd v Versailles Trade Finance Ltd & Ors [2010] EWHC 1614 (Ch) (30 June 2010)

Court membership
- Judges sitting: Neuberger MR; Richards LJ; Hughes LJ

Laws applied
- Overruled by
- FHR European Ventures LLP v Cedar Capital Partners LLC [2014] UKSC 45 "[A]t least [insofar] as they relied on or followed Heiron and Lister, should be treated as overruled." (Paragraph 50)

Keywords
- Constructive trust

Sinclair Investments (UK) Ltd v Versailles Trade Finance Ltd [2011] EWCA Civ 347 is an English trusts law case, concerning constructive trusts. Sinclair ([insofar] as it relied on or followed Heiron and Lister) was partially overruled in July 2014 by the UK Supreme Court in FHR European Ventures LLP v Cedar Capital Partners LLC.

== Facts ==
Between 1995 and 1999 various investors, including Sinclair Investments (UK) Ltd, paid money to Trading Partners Ltd to carry out trades in goods. Mr Cushnie was the director, transferred the money to another company he owned called Versailles Trade Finance Ltd, which was meant to engage in the factoring business. Instead, Versailles fraudulently used the money partly simply to pay ‘profits’ to traders, but also was stolen by Mr Clough, or circulated around other companies so as to appear that genuine business was taking place. Mr Cushnie sold his shares for £28.69m in 1999. Of this money, £9.19m went to the Versailles group, £1m to Mr Clough, £1.75m to traders, £2.25m loan repayment to NatWest, and £11.47m to RBS, of which £1.49m was an overdraft repayment and £9.98m was repayment of the loan secured on the Kensington property. Versailles was discovered, and it was put into receivership. Trading Partners Ltd had lost money because of Versailles activities, and was also put into liquidation in July 2000.

On behalf of creditors such as Sinclair, Trading Partners Ltd (now run by the liquidator) claimed a proprietary interest in Mr Cushnie’s profits from the sale of shares under a constructive trust. Versailles and the banks argued that they could exercise a bona fide purchaser defence. It also claimed to be entitled to the money that passed from Trading Partners to Versailles and were mixed with Versailles’ money, which could be traced into the banks’ hands.

Cushnie and Clough were sentenced to jail for six years each (Clough reduced to five) and were disqualified from being directors for 15 and 10 years respectively.

== Judgment ==
=== High Court ===
Lewison J held that the Court of Appeal decisions in Metropolitan Bank v Heiron and Lister & Co v Stubbs (Note: holding that a trustee had an equitable duty to account, but no proprietary interest) had not been overruled in England, and still remained binding. As to the nature of the proprietary remedy, he held:

80. On this part of the case I summarise my conclusions as follows:

i) I am bound to follow decisions of the Court of Appeal, in preference to decisions of the Privy Council, even if the latter have disapproved those decisions;
ii) Sugden v Crossland is clear first instance authority for the proposition that a fiduciary who, in breach of fiduciary duty, receives property which had not hitherto been (or been treated as) trust property, holds it as an accretion to the trust fund; and that decision was approved in Reid;
iii) But a series of decisions of the Court of Appeal (and of the Privy Council and the House of Lords), both before and after Reid, have drawn a clear distinction between two classes of case both of which have from time to time been labelled "trust" or "constructive trust";
iv) The distinction between the two classes of case is not confined to the availability of limitation defences;
v) The first class of case concerns a real trust, in which the property concerned really is held on trust and counts as trust property. The second does not; and is no more than a way of expressing a liability to account in equity. In the first class of case the claimant is entitled to enforce his proprietary rights. In the second he is entitled to a personal remedy;
vi) The distinction between the two classes is whether the defendant has assumed pre-existing fiduciary duties in relation to the specific item of property in issue. The expression "pre-existing" means duties which precede the events of which complaint is made. If he has, then the case falls within the first class. If he has not; and in particular if the fiduciary duty in relation to the specific item of property arises only as a result of the transaction being impugned, the case falls within the second class.
vii) A claim made in relation to unauthorised profits made by a company director otherwise than by acquiring and subsequently exploiting property formerly owned (or treated as owned) by the company itself falls within the second class of case.

Here, no trust would arise. TPL had no proprietary interest in the proceeds of the sale of the shares, and even if they did, the banks were bona fide purchasers, and the claim could not be asserted against them. However, TPL did have a proprietary claim to money passed to Versailles, that Versailles mixed with its own, and could thus trace it into the sums given by the receivers to the banks.

=== Court of Appeal ===
In a unanimous decision, the appeal and cross-appeal were dismissed. Neuberger MR held that the old Court of Appeal authority was binding, and TPL only had a personal claim in equity over the assets.

On appeal, the questions were:

1. Did T have a proprietary interest in the proceeds from the sale of shares?
2. Could it claim against the banks, or did they have a bona fide purchaser defence?
3. Was the limit on tracing correct?

In its appeal, TPL argued that Attorney General for Hong Kong v Reid should be followed. Neuberger responded:

73. I would reject that contention. We should not follow the Privy Council decision in Reid in preference to decisions of this court, unless there are domestic authorities which show that the decisions of this court were per incuriam, or at least of doubtful reliability. Save where there are powerful reasons to the contrary, the Court of Appeal should follow its own previous decisions, and in this instance there are five such previous decisions. (Note: Heiron 5 Ex D 319, Lister 45 Ch D 1, Archer's case [1892] 1 Ch 322, Powell [1905] 1 KB 11, and A-G's Reference [1986] 1 QB 491, listed at EWCA, par. 77) It is true that there is a powerful subsequent decision of the Privy Council which goes the other way, but that of itself is not enough to justify departing from the earlier decisions of this court...

74. I do not suggest that it would always be wrong for this court to refuse to follow a decision of the Privy Council in preference to one of its own previous decisions, but it the general rule is that we follow our previous decisions, leaving it to the Supreme Court to overrule those decisions if it is appropriate to do so. Two recent cases where this court preferred to follow a decision of the Privy Council rather than an earlier domestic decision which would normally be regarded as binding (in each case a decision of the House of Lords) are R v James (Leslie) and Abou-Rahmah v Abacha. In each case, the decision was justified, based as it was on the proposition that it was a foregone conclusion that, if the case had gone to the House of Lords, they would have followed the Privy Council decision.

75. In the present instance, Mr Miles invited us to take the view that it was a foregone conclusion that the Supreme Court would follow the Privy Council in Reid rather than the Court of Appeal in Heiron and Lister, and therefore to follow the Privy Council approach rather than that of this court.

76. Although it is possible that the Supreme Court would follow Reid rather than Heiron and Lister, I am far from satisfied that they would do so. In any event it does not seem to me right to follow Reid.

TPL had no proprietary claim over the proceeds from the sale of shares. Although the share profits could not have been received without Mr C having had his fiduciary office, the proceeds were not beneficially owned by TPL. The claimant could not get a proprietary interest rather than an equitable account for the money acquired in breach of trust, unless it had already been beneficially the property of the beneficiary, or the trustee acquired it by taking advantage of an opportunity or right that was properly that of the beneficiary. This should be distinguished from property obtained simply by being in the position of a fiduciary. There was a personal claim in equity to the funds. Mr C did not owe trustee like duties in relation to the shares (Note: In re North Australian Territory Company ("Archer's case"), [1892] 1 Ch 322 (CA) ("The director is really a watchdog and the watchdog has no right without the knowledge of his master, to take a sop from a possible wolf."). and Powell & Thomas v Evans Jones & Co, [1905] 1 KB 11 (CA).)

Even if TPL had a proprietary claim over the proceeds of sale of the shares, the banks had had no notice of it when they received, and so Lewison J was entitled to decide that the banks took free of the claim. The banks had no notice of TPL’s proprietary interest in the mixed fund before the time it was claimed back.

The general rule for tracing is that "If a man mixes trust funds with his own, the whole will be treated as trust property, except so far as he may be able to distinguish what is his own." This should be determined by the court on a balance of probabilities. In this case, the banks and receivers had acted in good faith, even though they might have properly sought legal advice about whether there was a proprietary interest in the mixed fund.

Richards LJ and Hughes LJ concurred.

== Significance ==
Lord Neuberger's analysis divides into three broad categories the situations in which a fiduciary obtains a benefit in breach of fiduciary duty:

1. where the benefit is or was an asset belonging beneficially to the principal,
2. where the benefit has been obtained by the fiduciary by taking an advantage of an opportunity which was properly that of the principal, and
3. all other cases.

While benefits in the first two categories will give rise to a constructive trust, those in the third category will not. However, one should also keep in mind the Supreme Court's decision in FHR European Ventures LLP v Cedar Capital Partners LLC, where bribes or secret commissions accepted by an agent will be held in trust for his principal.

Sinclair has been viewed as a controversial decision—especially in its conclusion that a proprietary interest did not arise, as proprietary rights carry priority in an insolvency, which is of central importance in a pyramid scheme such as that operated by Mr C. It is also argued that it will no longer be as easy to strip a recipient of a bribe or the profits made from it, or to trace it into the hands of third parties. It is at variance with other jurisdictions in the Commonwealth and the United States: the Federal Court of Australia preferred to follow Reid instead, as has the British Columbia Court of Appeal.

It should be borne in mind, however, that Sinclair ([insofar] as it relied on or followed Heiron and Lister) was (partially) overruled in July 2014 by the United Kingdom Supreme Court, in FHR European Ventures LLP v Cedar Capital Partners LLC.

== See also ==
- English trusts law
- English land law
- English property law
