= The Pines =

The Pines may refer to:

== Australia ==
- The Pines, Elanora, a shopping centre in Queensland
- The Pines, Queensland, a locality
- The Pines, South Australia, a locality
- The Pines Foreshore Reserve, a nature reserve on the Mornington Peninsula, Victoria
- The Pines Shopping Centre in Doncaster East, Melbourne, Victoria
- Frankston North, a suburb of Melbourne, Victoria, originally named Pines Forest

== New Zealand ==
- The Pines Beach, a beach town in Canterbury

== United Kingdom ==
- The Pines, Putney, a Grade II listed house in Putney, London

== United States ==
=== Alabama ===
- The Pines (Anniston, Alabama), a house on the National Register of Historic Places

=== Arkansas ===
- The Pines, Arkansas, an unincorporated community

=== California ===
- The Pines, San Bernardino County, California

=== Florida ===
- The Pines (Miami), a neighborhood within the city of Miami

=== New York ===
- The Pines (Lyons Falls, New York), a house on the National Register of Historic Places
- The Pines (Pine Plains, New York), a house on the National Register of Historic Places
- Fire Island Pines, a hamlet on Fire Island

=== Texas ===
- Lake O' the Pines, a reservoir in Marion County
- The Pines Catholic Camp, a Catholic summer camp and retreat center in Big Sandy, Texas

=== Virginia ===
- The Pines, Virginia

== Other uses ==
- Os Pinos, the official Galician anthem
- Las Piñas, a highly urbanized city in Metro Manila, Philippines

== See also ==
- Pine (disambiguation)
- Pines (disambiguation)
