= FHR European Ventures LLP v Cedar Capital Partners LLC =

UK legal case

FHR LLP v Cedar Capital LLC
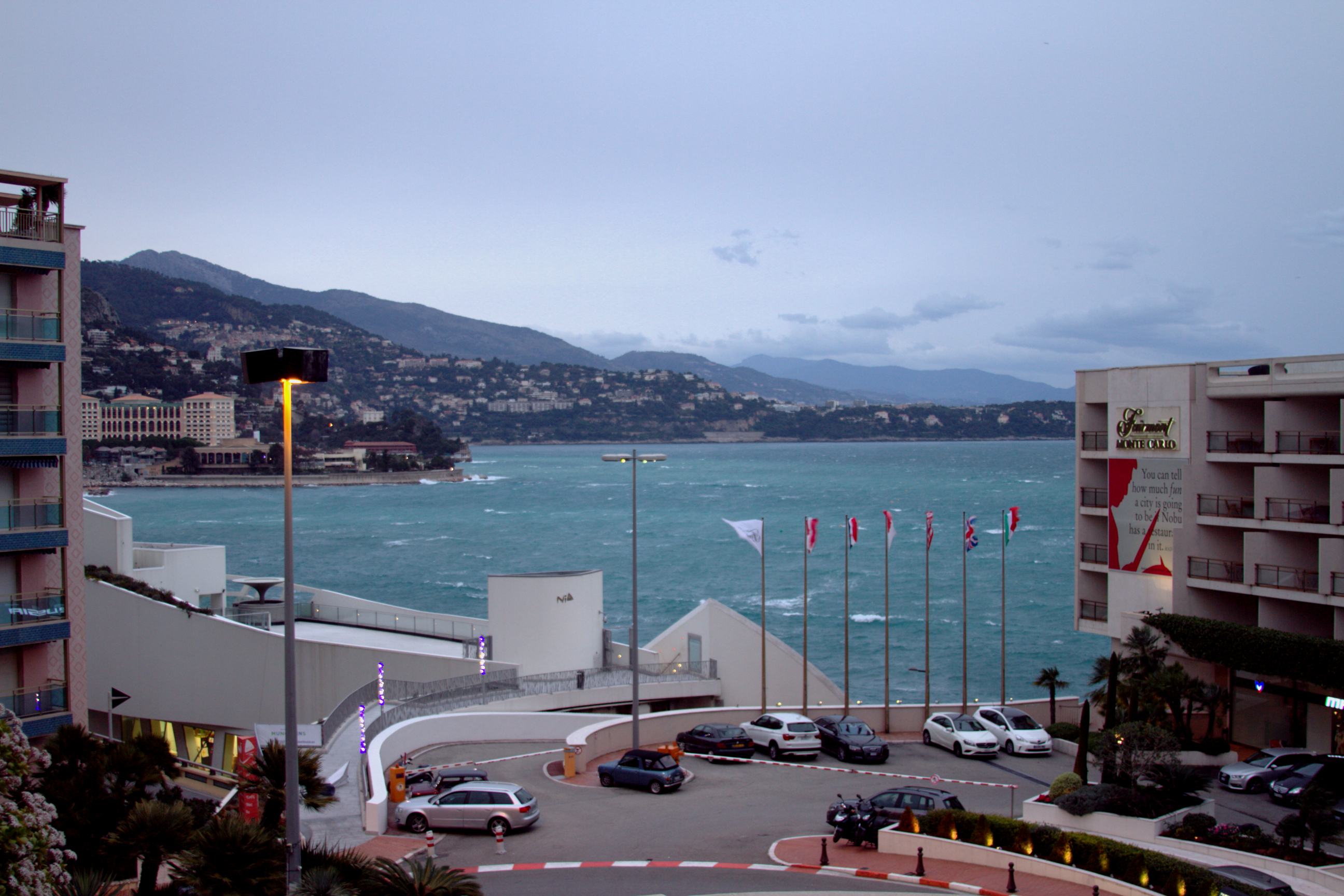
- Fairmont Monte Carlo, Monaco
- Court: Supreme Court of the United Kingdom
- Full case name: FHR European Ventures LLP & Ors v Cedar Capital Partners LLC
- Argued: 17–19 June 2014
- Decided: 16 July 2014
- Neutral citation: [2014] UKSC 45

Case history
- Prior history: On appeal from FHR European Ventures LLP v Mankarious & Ors [2013] EWCA Civ 17 (29 January 2013), setting aside FHR European Ventures LLP & Ors v Mankarious & Ors [2011] EWHC 2308 (Ch) (5 September 2011)

Holding
- A bribe or secret commission accepted by an agent is held on trust for his principal.

Case opinions
- Majority: Lord Neuberger, for a unanimous Court

Laws applied
- This case overturned a previous ruling
- Metropolitan Bank v Heiron [1880] Lister & Co v Stubbs [1890] Powell & Thomas v Evan Jones & Co [1905] The Attorney-General's Reference (No 1 of 1985) [1986] Sinclair Investments (UK) Ltd v Versailles Trade Finance Ltd [2011] "[A]t least [insofar] as they relied on or followed Heiron and Lister, should be treated as overruled." (Paragraph 50)

Area of law
- constructive trust; equitable compensation

FHR European Ventures LLP v Cedar Capital Partners LLC [2014] UKSC 45 is a landmark decision of the United Kingdom Supreme Court which holds that a bribe or secret commission accepted by an agent is held on trust for his principal. In so ruling, the Court partially overruled Sinclair Investments (UK) Ltd v Versailles Trade Finance Ltd (a decision of the Court of Appeal of England and Wales) in favour of The Attorney General for Hong Kong v Reid (New Zealand) (UKPC), a ruling from the Judicial Committee of the Privy Council on appeal from New Zealand.

== Facts ==
Cedar Capital Partners LLC ("Cedar" or "the defendants") provided consultancy services to the hotel industry. Cedar agreed to act as the agent of FHR European Ventures LLP ("the Purchaser" or "FHR" or "the claimants") in negotiations for purchase of share capital in Monte Carlo Grand Hotel SAM from Monte Carlo Grand Hotel Ltd ("the Vendor" or "Monte Carlo").

- In September 2004, Cedar entered into an agreement with the Vendor which provided for the payment to Cedar of a €10m fee following a successful conclusion of the sale and purchase of the issued share capital of Monte Carlo Grand Hotel SAM.
- In December 2004, the sale went ahead: the Purchaser acquired the issued share capital of Monte Carlo Grand Hotel SAM from the Vendor for €211.5m.
- In January 2005, the Vendor paid Cedar the €10m commission.
- In November 2009 the Purchaser commenced an action for recovery of the sum of €10m from Cedar and other parties on the ground of breach of fiduciary duty.

The Purchaser argued that Cedar owed a fiduciary duty. In breach of that fiduciary duty, Cedar had made a secret commission. The Purchaser argued that this secret commission was now held on constructive trust.

== Judgment ==
=== High Court ===
Simon J ruled in favour of the claimants, concluding that he should:

1. Make a declaration of liability for breach of fiduciary duty on the part of Cedar for having failed to obtain the claimants' fully informed consent in respect of the €10m; and
2. Order Cedar to pay such sum to the claimants, but, in a further ruling,
3. He refused to grant the claimants a proprietary remedy in respect of the monies.

In the latter ruling, he held that he was bound by the precedents in Sinclair and Cadogan. He stated:

15. I am satisfied on the basis of the Sinclair case that, unless either (a) the sum of €10 million was or had been beneficially the property of the Claimants or (b) Cedar acquired the money by taking advantage of an opportunity which was properly that of the Claimants, the Claimants are not entitled currently to the declaration they seek.

Accordingly, he issued the following declaration:

It is declared that the Second Defendant, having failed to obtain the fully informed consent of any of the Claimants to the commission payment made to it by Monte Carlo Grand Hotel Limited ('MCGH') of the sum of €10 million in respect of the sale by MCGH of a long leasehold interest in the Hotel in December 2004 to the First Claimant, is liable to account for that sum to the Claimants (to each of which it owed fiduciary duties) following its receipt by the Second Defendant on or about 7 January 2005.

The Claimants appealed the ruling as to the declaration issued, submitting that it should be in the form of a proprietary remedy instead.

=== Court of Appeal ===
In a unanimous decision, the appeal was allowed. Lewison LJ acknowledged that, as Sinclair had endorsed Metropolitan Bank v Heiron and Lister & Co v Stubbs, he was bound to follow them as well. Upon reviewing the authorities, he felt he could distinguish the case on the facts:

56. ... I do not consider that in paragraph 88 Lord Neuberger MR can have intended to create two mutually exclusive categories of cases in which a proprietary interest can arise. Thus I do not consider that Mr Collings is right in submitting that once Cedar's commission has been characterised as a secret commission it cannot also be characterised as a lost opportunity. The formulations in paragraph 89 on its face deals only with assets purchased by the defaulting fiduciary. That is not the case here, because Cedar purchased nothing. But the difference in language between the two formulation shows, if nothing else, how difficult it is to lay down prescriptive rules.

57. Although some cases have treated a business opportunity as an intangible asset, I would be prepared to accept Mr Collings' submission that an "opportunity" to acquire property at a reduced price cannot "belong" to anyone in the sense of literally amounting to a proprietary right in the opportunity itself. After all, you cannot assign it or transfer it; you cannot charge it; you cannot leave it by will. But Lord Neuberger, in speaking of "an opportunity or right which was properly that of the beneficiary" in paragraph 88 eschewed the language of proprietary ownership of the opportunity itself. It is true that in paragraph 89 he referred to opportunities "beneficially owned" by the principal; but he did not discuss further what that elusive concept might mean. Nor was the court referred to Bhullar v Bhullar in which this court decisively rejected the notion that it was necessary to identify some form of beneficial ownership of the opportunity itself. We have also seen that in Cook v Deeks the Privy Council did not say that the opportunity itself "belonged" to the company. What "belonged to it in equity" was the contract that came into existence as a result of the exploitation of the opportunity.

58. Accordingly, I do not consider that the question of tracing or following arises at the stage of the opportunity itself. It will arise once the court declares that an asset is held on constructive trust for the principal. It will then be possible to follow the asset held on constructive trust or to trace its value into identifiable substitutes.

Etherton C also agreed that the appeal should be allowed, but emphasised that Boardman v Phipps had received inadequate consideration in the reasoning underlying Sinclair. Pill LJ agreed with both judgments.

Cedar appealed the ruling to the Supreme Court.

=== Supreme Court ===
The Supreme Court dismissed the appeal, and held that Cedar (the defendants) held the €10m commission on constructive trust for FHR (the claimants). Lord Neuberger gave the leading judgment, with which the whole Court agreed.

1. This is the judgment of the Court on the issue of whether a bribe or secret commission received by an agent is held by the agent on trust for his principal, or whether the principal merely has a claim for equitable compensation in a sum equal to the value of the bribe or commission. The answer to this rather technical sounding question, which has produced inconsistent judicial decisions over the past 200 years, as well as a great deal of more recent academic controversy, is important in practical terms. If the bribe or commission is held on trust, the principal has a proprietary claim to it, whereas if the principal merely has a claim for equitable compensation, the claim is not proprietary. The distinction is significant for two main reasons. First, if the agent becomes insolvent, a proprietary claim would effectively give the principal priority over the agent's unsecured creditors, whereas the principal would rank pari passu, ie equally, with other unsecured creditors if he only has a claim for compensation. Secondly, if the principal has a proprietary claim to the bribe or commission, he can trace and follow it in equity, whereas (unless we develop the law of equitable tracing beyond its current boundaries) a principal with a right only to equitable compensation would have no such equitable right to trace or follow.

[...]

7. However, the centrally relevant point for present purposes is that, at least in some cases where an agent acquires a benefit which came to his notice as a result of his fiduciary position, or pursuant to an opportunity which results from his fiduciary position, the equitable rule (“the rule”) is that he is to be treated as having acquired the benefit on behalf of his principal, so that it is beneficially owned by the principal. In such cases, the principal has a proprietary remedy in addition to his personal remedy against the agent, and the principal can elect between the two remedies.

[...]

11. The respondents' formulation of the rule, namely that it applies to all benefits received by an agent in breach of his fiduciary duty to his principal, is explained on the basis that an agent ought to account in specie to his principal for any benefit he has obtained from his agency in breach of his fiduciary duty, as the benefit should be treated as the property of the principal, as supported by many judicial dicta including those in para 19 above, and can be seen to be reflected in Jonathan Parker LJ's observations in para 14 above.

[... Lord Neuberger reviewed the relevant cases and continued...]

19. [...] many of those cases contain observations which specifically support the contention that the rule applies to all benefits which are received by an agent in breach of his fiduciary duty.

[...]

33. The position adopted by the respondents, namely that the Rule applies to all unauthorised benefits which an agent receives, is consistent with the fundamental principles of the law of agency. The agent owes a duty of undivided loyalty to the principal, unless the latter has given his informed consent to some less demanding standard of duty. The principal is thus entitled to the entire benefit of the agent's acts in the course of his agency. This principle is wholly unaffected by the fact that the agent may have exceeded his authority. The principal is entitled to the benefit of the agent's unauthorised acts in the course of his agency, in just the same way as, at law, an employer is vicariously liable to bear the burden of an employee's unauthorised breaches of duty in the course of his employment. The agent's duty is accordingly to deliver up to his principal the benefit which he has obtained, and not simply to pay compensation for having obtained it in excess of his authority. The only way that legal effect can be given to an obligation to deliver up specific property to the principal is by treating the principal as specifically entitled to it.

[...]

35. The respondents' formulation of the rule has the merit of simplicity: any benefit acquired by an agent as a result of his agency and in breach of his fiduciary duty is held on trust for the principal. On the other hand, the appellant's position is more likely to result in uncertainty. Clarity and simplicity are highly desirable qualities in the law. Subtle distinctions are sometimes inevitable, but in the present case, as mentioned above, there is no plainly right answer, and, accordingly, in the absence of any other good reason, it would seem right to opt for the simple answer.

[...]

42. Wider policy considerations also support the respondents' case that bribes and secret commissions received by an agent should be treated as the property of his principal, rather than merely giving rise to a claim for equitable compensation.... one would expect the law to be particularly stringent in relation to a claim against an agent who has received a bribe or secret commission.

43. On the other hand, a point frequently emphasised by those who seek to justify restricting the ambit of the rule is that the wide application for which the respondents contend will tend to prejudice the agent's unsecured creditors, as it will serve to reduce the estate of the agent if he becomes insolvent. This was seen as a good reason in Sinclair [2012] Ch 453, para 83 for not following Reid. While the point has considerable force in some contexts, it appears to us to have limited force in the context of a bribe or secret commission. In the first place, the proceeds of a bribe or secret commission consists of property which should not be in the agent's estate at all, as Lawrence Collins J pointed out in Daraydan [2005] Ch 119, para 78 (although it is fair to add that insolvent estates not infrequently include assets which would not be there if the insolvent had honoured his obligations). Secondly, as discussed in para 37 above, at any rate in many cases, the bribe or commission will very often have reduced the benefit from the relevant transaction which the principal will have obtained, and therefore can fairly be said to be his property.

44. Lindley LJ in Lister ... appears to have found it offensive that a principal should be entitled to trace a bribe, but he did not explain why, and we prefer the reaction of Lord Templeman in Reid, namely that a principal ought to have the right to trace and to follow a bribe or secret commission.

== Previous jurisprudence ==
=== Fiduciary duties ===
The following general principles were summarized in Bristol and West Building Society v Mothew:

1. An agent owes a fiduciary duty to his principal because he is "someone who has undertaken to act for or on behalf of [his principal] in a particular matter in circumstances which give rise to a relationship of trust and confidence".
2. As a result, an agent "must not make a profit out of his trust" and "must not place himself in a position in which his duty and his interest may conflict." In that regard, the former proposition is "part of the [latter] wider rule".
3. "[A] fiduciary who acts for two principals with potentially conflicting interests without the informed consent of both is in breach of the obligation of undivided loyalty; he puts himself in a position where his duty to one principal may conflict with his duty to the other." Such "informed consent" is only effective if it is given after "full disclosure."

Where an agent receives a benefit in breach of his fiduciary duty, it is obliged to account to the principal for such a benefit, and to pay, in effect, a sum equal to the profit by way of equitable compensation. As Lord Russell explained in Regal (Hastings) Ltd v Gulliver:

The rule of equity which insists on those, who by use of a fiduciary position make a profit, being liable to account for that profit, in no way depends on fraud, or absence of bona fides; or upon such questions or considerations as whether the profit would or should otherwise have gone to the plaintiff, or whether the profiteer was under a duty to obtain the source of the profit for the plaintiff, or whether he took a risk or acted as he did for the benefit of the plaintiff, or whether the plaintiff has in fact been damaged or benefited by his action. The liability arises from the mere fact of a profit having, in the stated circumstances, been made.

Where an agent acquires a benefit in breach of his fiduciary duty, the relief accorded by equity is "primarily restitutionary or restorative rather than compensatory," representing a personal remedy for the principal against the agent. However, in some cases where an agent acquires a benefit which came to his notice as a result of his fiduciary position, or pursuant to an opportunity which results from his fiduciary position, the equitable rule is that he is to be treated as having acquired the benefit on behalf of his principal, so that it is beneficially owned by the principal. In such cases, the principal has a proprietary remedy in addition to his personal remedy against the agent, and the principal can elect between the two remedies. The equitable rule is strictly applied, and has its origins in the 1726 case of Keech v Sandford.

=== Other jurisdictions ===
Extensive debate occurred as to the limits and boundaries of the equitable rule, especially where a bribe or secret commission was obtained by an agent in breach of his fiduciary duty to his principal:

- Several commentators contended that it is not a benefit which can properly be said to be the property of the principal. This view has been supported in Sinclair.
- Others submitted that, where an agent receives a benefit, which is, or results from, a breach of the fiduciary duty owed to his principal, the agent holds the benefit on trust for the principal. This has received legal recognition in Reid.

Sinclair was seen to be the more controversial decision, and has attracted considerable debate in academic literature. The Court of Appeal of Singapore preferred to follow Reid instead, as has the Federal Court of Australia and the British Columbia Court of Appeal. In England and Wales, several judges have expressed a preference for Reid. United States jurisprudence has tended to be similar to Reid.

== Significance of FHR ==
FHR was significant in several respects:

- The view that an agent should not hold a bribe or commission on trust, because he could not have acquired it on behalf of his principal, is inconsistent with several long-standing English decisions.
- Tyrrell v Bank of London (upon which Heiron and Lister were based) was disapproved, as it failed to consider the previous decision in Fawcett v Whitehouse, and therefore should not be followed, and
- any subsequent decisions, at least in so far as they relied on or followed Heiron and Lister, should be treated as overruled.

=== Consequences ===
While Reid was concerned with a criminal situation, FHR arose from a commercial one. It is argued that a proprietary remedy for bribes and secret commissions can thus be awarded in a variety of situations:

- payments as disguised fees or loans by vendors or landlords to agents, and
- transfers of shares, or payments to a trustee, in order to induce a desired action.

The practical implications have been asserted as extending over a broad range:

1. It encompasses all manner of fiduciary relationships, including employer-employee, company-director, some categories of public official, and trustee-beneficiary.
2. While the proprietary remedy will allow tracing into the assets of the agent and any relevant third parties in order to claim any fruits of the fraud, a personal claim is still available where it may yield greater value.
3. The proprietary remedy also attracts ancillary measures, including freezing injunctions and Chabra relief.
4. Under English law, proprietary claims to bribes and secret commissions may not be time-barred under the Limitation Act 1980, as it may amount to a claim to recover trust property.
5. As the ruling will allow civil cases to conduct more factual enquiries into the circumstances surrounding secret payments, it will be necessary for agents to disclose such activities more extensively and to obtain appropriate approval from their principals.
6. As claimant-principals will now be able to assert title to bribes and secret commissions in their agent’s hands, unsecured creditors may lose out in any connected insolvency proceedings.

In its judgment, the Supreme Court addressed the divergence of opinions arising in the various common law jurisdictions:

As overseas countries secede from the jurisdiction of the Privy Council, it is inevitable that inconsistencies in the common law will develop between different jurisdictions. However, it seems to us highly desirable for all those jurisdictions to learn from each other, and at least to lean in favour of harmonising the development of the common law round the world.

It also gave guidance in assessing the relevance of prior jurisprudence:

... although Fawcett was cited in argument ... it was not considered in any of the three opinions in Tyrrell; indeed, no previous decision was referred to in the opinions, and, although the opinions were expressed with a confidence familiar to those who read 19th century judgments, they contained no reasoning, merely assertion.

== See also ==
- English trusts law
