= Pine tree (disambiguation) =

Pine trees are coniferous trees in the genus Pinus.

Pine tree or pinetree may also refer to:

== Art and entertainment ==
- Pine Tree (album), by South Korean singer Kangta, released in 2002
- "Pine Tree, Pine over Me", a popular American song written in 1953
- The Pine Tree at Saint Tropez, a 1909 painting by French painter Paul Signac
- The Pine Tree in the Mountain, a 1971 Croatian film

== Education ==
- Pine Tree Academy, a school in Freeport, Maine, U.S.
- Pine Tree High School, in Longview, Texas, U.S.
- Pine Tree Independent School District, in Longview, Texas, U.S.
- Pinetree Secondary School, in British Columbia, Canada

== Nature ==
=== Geographical features ===
- Pine Tree Arch, a large natural sandstone arch near Moab, Utah, U.S.
- Pine Tree Gulch, a valley in San Mateo County, California, U.S.
- Pine Tree Run, a tributary in New Jersey, U.S.
- El Pino (The Pine Tree), a large bunya pine in East Los Angeles, California, U.S.

=== Moths ===
- Pine tree emperor moth, non-scientific name for Nudaurelia cytherea, a moth of the family Saturniidae
- Pine-tree lappet, non-scientific name for Dendrolimus pini, a moth of the family Lasiocampidae

=== Vegetation ===
- African pine tree, Afrocarpus falcatus, a species in the family Podocarpaceae
- Ground pine (disambiguation), several plants
- Norfolk Island pine, Araucaria heterophylla, a coniferous tree
- Running pine, Lycopodium clavatum, a species of clubmoss
- Screw pine, various species of plants in the genus Pandanus
- Wollemi pine, Wollemia nobilis, a coniferous tree

== Places ==
- Pine Tree, Nova Scotia, a community in Canada
- Pine Tree Point, a camp area in northern New York State, U.S.

== Other uses ==
- Pine Tree Council, a group within Boy Scouts of America headquartered in Raymond, Maine, U.S.
- Pine Tree Flag, one of the flags used during the American Revolution
- Pine Tree Golf Club, in Boynton Beach, Florida, U.S.
- Pine Tree Legal Assistance, a nonprofit agency in Maine, U.S.
- Pine Tree Lumber Company Office Building, a historic building in Little Falls, Minnesota, U.S.
- Pine Tree Riot, an act of resistance in the British Province of New Hampshire in 1772
- Pine tree shilling, a type of coin minted and circulated in the Thirteen Colonies
- Pine Tree State, nickname of the U.S. state of Maine
- Pine Tree State, original name of USS Harris, a transport ship launched in 1921
- Pinetree, nickname of Colin Meads (1936–2017), New Zealand rugby union footballer
- Pinetree Line, a North-American radar system of the Cold War era

== See also ==
- Pine (disambiguation)
- Pines (disambiguation)
