= Pine Island, Florida =

Pine Island may refer to:

- Pine Island, Calhoun County, Florida, an unincorporated community near Blountstown
- Pine Island, Hernando County, Florida, a census-designated place near Spring Hill
- Pine Island (Lee County, Florida), an island near Cape Coral
  - Pine Island Center, Florida, a census-designated place on that island
  - Pine Island National Wildlife Refuge on that island
  - Pine Island Sound west of that island
- Pine Island Ridge, Florida, a former census-designated place, now part of Davie, Broward County
