= Pine Forest =

Pine forest may refer to:

- A forest of pine trees
  - Temperate coniferous forest, a terrestrial habitat type defined by the World Wide Fund for Nature
- Pine Forest, Texas, a city in Orange County, Texas, U.S.
- Pine Forest Charter School, in Flagstaff, Arizona, U.S.
- Pine Forest High School, in Pensacola, Florida, U.S.
- Pine Forest High School (North Carolina), in Fayetteville, U.S.

== See also ==
- Pine (disambiguation)
