= Pine Township, Indiana =

Pine Township, Indiana may refer to one of the following places:

- Pine Township, Benton County, Indiana
- Pine Township, Porter County, Indiana
- Pine Township, Warren County, Indiana

== See also ==
- Pine Township (disambiguation)
