= Pine Ridge =

Pine Ridge may refer to:

- Pine Ridge (region), of northwestern Nebraska and southwestern South Dakota
- Pine Ridge Indian Reservation of southwestern South Dakota
- Pine Ridge Campaign of the United States Army
- Pine Ridge, Alabama
- Pine Ridge, former name of Pineridge, California
- Pine Ridge, Citrus County, Florida
- Pine Ridge, Collier County, Florida
- Pine Ridge, Indiana
- Pine Ridge, Kentucky
- Pine Ridge, Michigan
- Pine Ridge, Mississippi
- Pine Ridge, Nebraska, the U.S. Census Bureau's name for the community more commonly called Whiteclay
- Pine Ridge, Dawes County, Nebraska
- Pine Ridge, Surry County, North Carolina
- Pine Ridge, Oklahoma
- Pine Ridge, South Carolina, in Lexington County
- Pine Ridge, Darlington County, South Carolina
- Pine Ridge, South Dakota
- Pine Ridge at Crestwood, New Jersey
- Pine Island Ridge, Florida
- Pine Ridge Secondary School, in Pickering, Ontario, Canada
- Pine Ridge (Lum and Abner), the fictional Arkansas location of the Lum and Abner radio and film series
- Pine Ridge Farm, a historic house in Raleigh, North Carolina
