= Attorney General for Hong Kong v Reid =

1993 Privy Council trust law case

The Attorney General for Hong Kong v Reid (New Zealand) (UKPC)
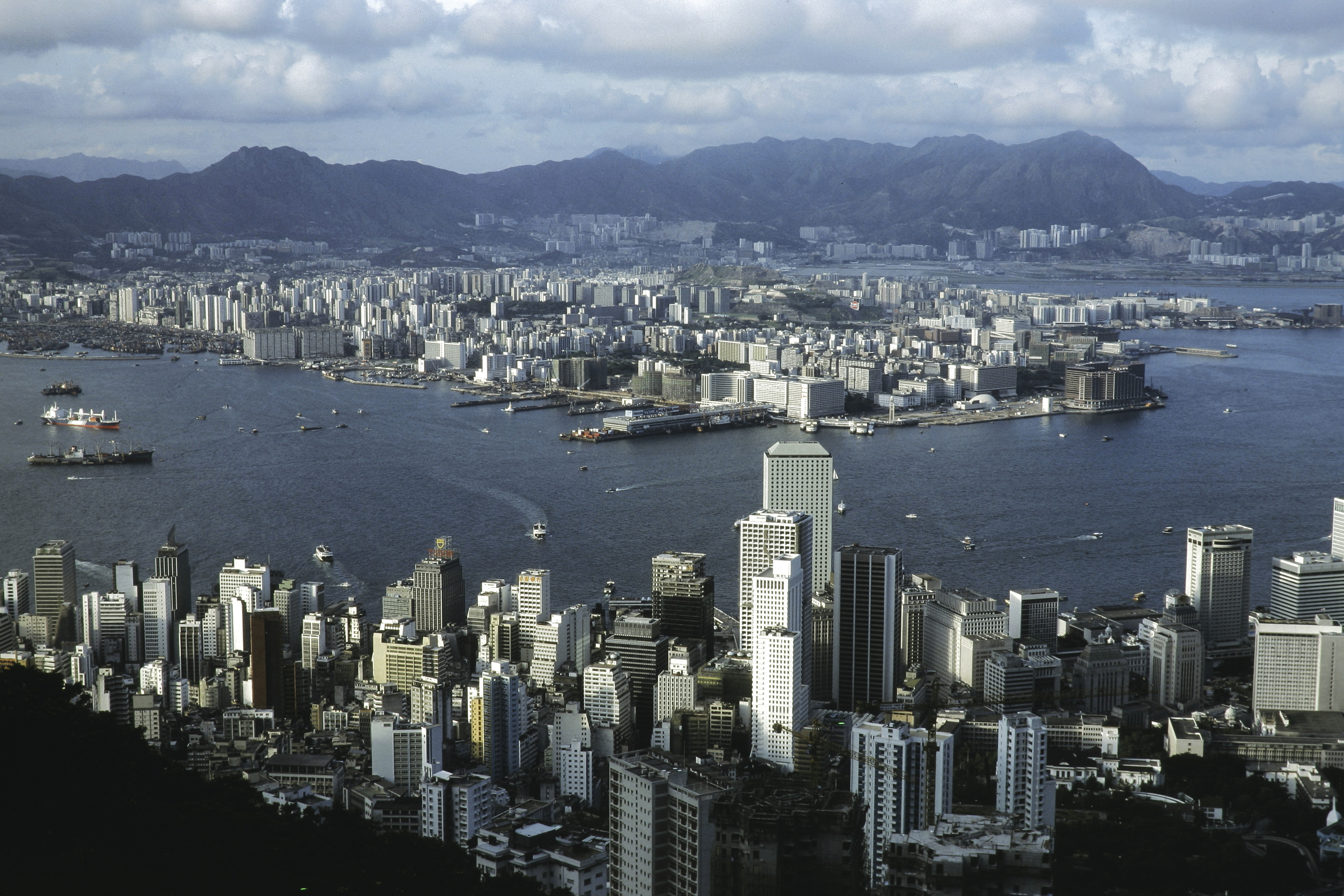
- Court: Judicial Committee of the Privy Council
- Full case name: The Attorney General for Hong Kong v Charles Warwick Reid (New Zealand) (UKPC) ([1993] UKPC 2) The Attorney General for Hong Kong v (1) Charles Warwick Reid and Judith Margaret Reid and (2) Marc Molloy (New Zealand) (UKPC) ([1993] UKPC 36)
- Decided: 1 November 1993
- Citations: [1993] UKPC 2, [1993] UKPC 36 ([1994] 1 AC 324, [1994] 1 All ER 1)
- Transcripts: Full transcript on bailii.org Full transcript on bailii.org

Court membership
- Judges sitting: Lord Templeman; Lord Goff of Chieveley; Lord Lowry; Lord Lloyd of Berwick; Sir Thomas Eichelbaum

Keywords
- Constructive trustee; breach of trust; bribery

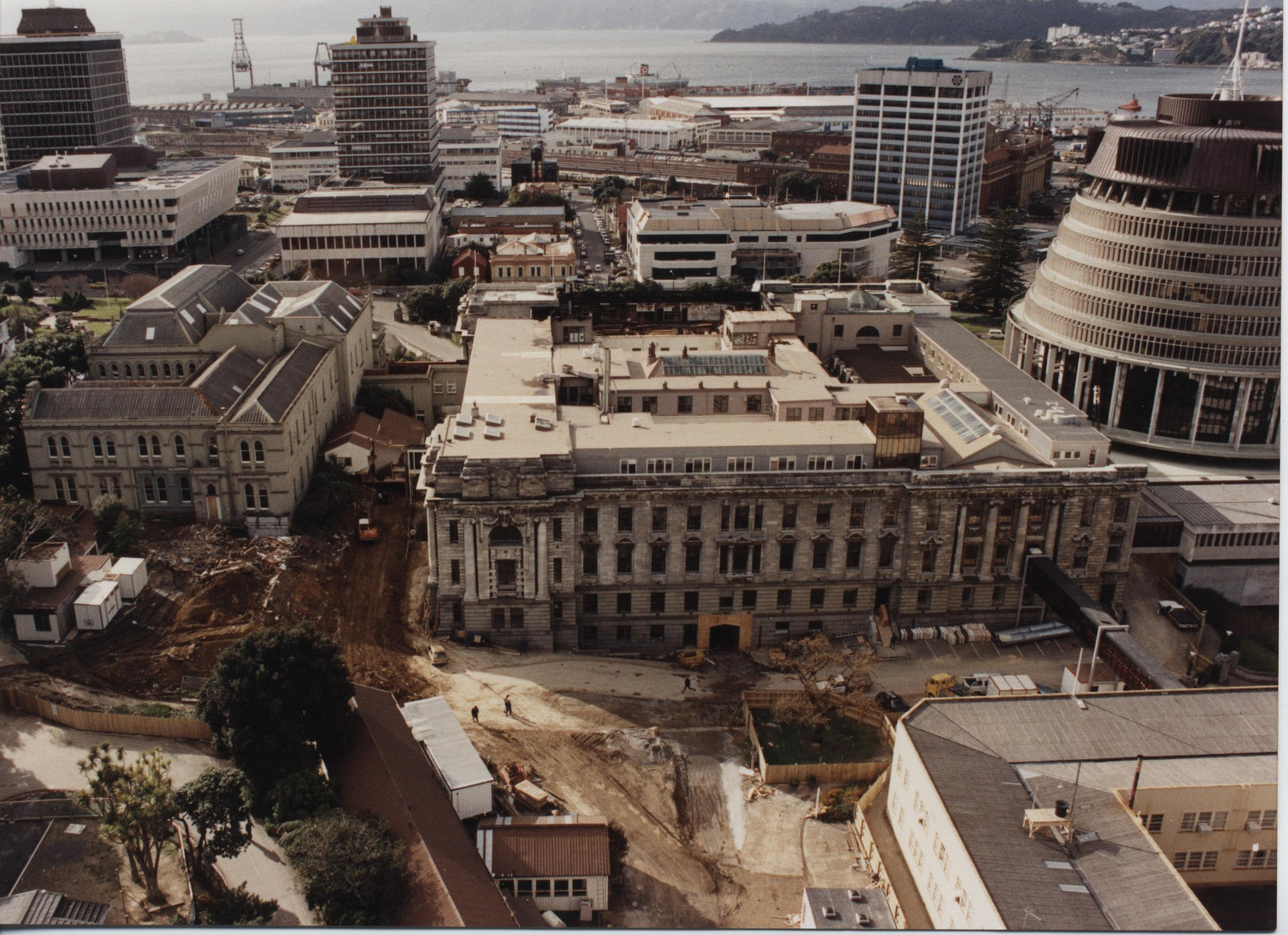
The case originated from New Zealand as an appeal from the Court of Appeal of New Zealand, Wellington.

The Attorney General for Hong Kong v Reid (New Zealand) (UKPC) [1993] UKPC 2 was a New Zealand-originated trust law case heard and decided by the Judicial Committee of the Privy Council, where it was held that bribe money accepted by a person in a position of trust, can be traced into any property bought and is held on constructive trust for the beneficiary.

After a period of legal uncertainty, this case was finally and unquestionably accepted and adopted into domestic English jurisprudence by the UK Supreme Court in FHR European Ventures LLP v Cedar Capital Partners LLC [2014] UKSC 45.

== Facts ==
Charles Warwick Reid was a New Zealand citizen who was employed as a Hong Kong Deputy Crown Prosecutor and then acting director of Public Prosecutions, so in a fiduciary relationship with the Hong Kong government. He took bribes to obstruct prosecution of some criminals, and used the money to buy land in New Zealand. Some was kept by Mr Reid and his wife, Mrs Judith Margaret Reid, some conveyed to Reid's solicitor. The Hong Kong government argued the land was held on trust for them.

== Held ==
The Privy Council advised the bribe money received by Reid, and the land acquired after, was held on constructive trust for the Hong Kong government. This meant that the land bought by Reid and his wife was held on trust, and had to be given over to the Hong Kong government. This was held to be necessary to ensure that people in positions of trust could in no way profit from their wrongdoing. If the property was badly invested, the fiduciary in breach would still be under a duty to make good the shortfall. Lord Templeman delivered the advice of the Board.

The false fiduciary who received the bribe in breach of duty must pay and account for the bribe to the person to whom that duty was owed. In the present case, as soon as the first respondent received a bribe in breach of the duties he owed to the Government of Hong Kong, he became a debtor in equity to the Crown for the amount of that bribe. So much is admitted. But if the bribe consists of property which increases in value or if a cash bribe is invested advantageously, the false fiduciary will receive a benefit from his breach of duty unless he is accountable not only for the original amount or value of the bribe but also for the increased value of the property representing the bribe. As soon as the bribe was received it should have been paid or transferred instanter to the person who suffered from the breach of duty. Equity considers as done that which ought to have been done. As soon as the bribe was received, whether in cash or in kind, the false fiduciary held the bribe on a constructive trust for the person injured. Two objections have been raised to this analysis. First it is said that if the fiduciary is in equity a debtor to the person injured, he cannot also be a trustee of the bribe. But there is no reason why equity should not provide two remedies, so long as they do not result in double recovery. If the property representing the bribe exceeds the original bribe in value, the fiduciary cannot retain the benefit of the increase in value which he obtained solely as a result of his breach of duty. Secondly, it is said that if the false fiduciary holds property representing the bribe in trust for the person injured, and if the false fiduciary is or becomes insolvent, the unsecured creditors of the false fiduciary will be deprived of their right to share in the proceeds of that property. But the unsecured creditors cannot be in a better position than their debtor. The authorities show that property acquired by a trustee innocently but in breach of trust and the property from time to time representing the same belong in equity to the cestui que trust and not to the trustee personally whether he is solvent or insolvent. Property acquired by a trustee as a result of a criminal breach of trust and the property from time to time representing the same must also belong in equity to his cestui que trust and not to the trustee whether he is solvent or insolvent.

[...]

It has always been assumed and asserted that the law on the subject of bribes was definitively settled by the decision of the Court of Appeal in Lister & Co v Stubbs (1890) 45 Ch.D. 1.

In that case the plaintiffs, Lister & Co., employed the defendant, Stubbs, as their servant to purchase goods for the firm. Stubbs, on behalf of the firm, bought goods from Varley & Co. and received from Varley & Co. bribes amounting to £5,541. The bribes were invested by Stubbs in freehold properties and investments. His masters, the firm Lister & Co., sought and failed to obtain an interlocutory injunction restraining Stubbs from disposing of these assets pending the trial of the *336 action in which they sought, inter alia, £5,541 and damages. In the Court of Appeal the first judgment was given by Cotton L.J. who had been party to the decision in Metropolitan Bank v Heiron, 5 Ex.D. 319 . He was powerfully supported by the judgment of Lindley LJ and by the equally powerful concurrence of Bowen LJ and Cotton LJ said, at p. 12, that the bribe could not be said to be the money of the plaintiffs. He seemed to be reluctant to grant an interlocutory judgment which would provide security for a debt before that debt had been established. Lindley LJ said, at p. 15, that the relationship between the plaintiffs, Lister & Co., as masters and the defendant, Stubbs, as servant who had betrayed his trust and received a bribe:

'is that of debtor and creditor; it is not that of trustee and cestui que trust. We are asked to hold that it is - which would involve consequences which, I confess, startle me. One consequence, of course, would be that, if Stubbs were to become bankrupt, this property acquired by him with the money paid to him by Messrs. Varley would be withdrawn from the mass of his creditors and be handed over bodily to Lister & Co. Can that be right? Another consequence would be that, if the appellants are right, Lister & Co. could compel Stubbs to account to them, not only for the money with interest, but for all the profits which he might have made by embarking in trade with it. Can that be right?'

For the reasons which have already been advanced their Lordships would respectfully answer both these questions in the affirmative. If a trustee mistakenly invests moneys which he ought to pay over to his cestui que trust and then becomes bankrupt, the moneys together with any profit which has accrued from the investment are withdrawn from the unsecured creditors as soon as the mistake is discovered. A fortiori if a trustee commits a crime by accepting a bribe which he ought to pay over to his cestui que trust, the bribe and any profit made therefrom should be withdrawn from the unsecured creditors as soon as the crime is discovered.

The decision in Lister & Co v Stubbs is not consistent with the principles that a fiduciary must not be allowed to benefit from his own breach of duty, that the fiduciary should account for the bribe as soon as he receives it and that equity regards as done that which ought to be done. From these principles it would appear to follow that the bribe and the property from time to time representing the bribe are held on a constructive trust for the person injured. A fiduciary remains personally liable for the amount of the bribe if, in the event, the value of the property then recovered by the injured person proved to be less than that amount.

Lord Goff, Lord Lowry, Lord Lloyd and Sir Thomas Eichelbaum concurred.

== Significance ==
In Sinclair Investments (UK) Ltd v Versailles Trade Finance Ltd [2011] EWCA Civ 347 the Court of Appeal declined to rely on this particular case from the Privy Council as precedent and instead preferred the original English legal position set out in Lister & Co v Stubbs (1890) LR 45 Ch D 1. However the Court of Appeal judgement was partially overturned by FHR European Ventures LLP v Cedar Capital Partners LLC [2014] UKSC 45.

== Subsequent events ==
Reid served a four-year prison sentence for the criminal charges relating to the bribes, after which he was deported to his native New Zealand. Although he was barred from practising as a lawyer, he set up a legal consultancy in 2013 which provoked anger in both New Zealand and Hong Kong.

== See also ==
- English trusts law
