= Pine Bluff (disambiguation) =

Pine Bluff, officially the City of Pine Bluff, is a city in the U.S. state of Arkansas.

Pine Bluff may also refer to:

== Places ==
- Pine Bluff, Arkansas, the county seat of Jefferson County
  - Pine Bluff Arsenal, a military installation in Arkansas
  - Pine Bluff Commercial Historic District, a downtown historic district in Pine Bluff, Jefferson County
- Pine Bluff, West Virginia, an unincorporated community in Harrison County, West Virginia
- Pine Bluff, Wisconsin, an unincorporated community in Dane County, Wisconsin

== Education ==
- Pine Bluff High School, a comprehensive public high school in Pine Bluff, Arkansas

== Events ==
- Battle of Pine Bluff, a battle of the American Civil War

== Sports ==
- Pine Bluff Judges, a minor league baseball team from Pine Bluff, Arkansas

== Other uses ==
- Pine Bluff (horse), an American Thoroughbred racehorse

== See also ==
- Pinebluff, North Carolina, a town in Moore County
- Pine Bluffs, Wyoming, a town in Laramie County
- Pine Bluffs High School, a comprehensive public high school in Pine Bluffs, Wyoming
