= Pines (disambiguation) =

Pines are any coniferous tree of the genus Pinus.

Pines may also refer to:

== People ==
- Alexander Pines (1945–2024), American chemist
- Burt Pines (born 1939), American attorney and politician
- David Pines (1924–2018), American theoretical physicist
- Dinora Pines (1918–2002), British physician and psychoanalyst
- Joseph I. Pines (1922–2009), American lawyer and Judge on the Supreme Bench of Baltimore City (renamed the Circuit Court of Maryland for Baltimore City)
- Leonard Pines (born Leonard Pinckowitz, 1911–2001), American businessman
- Lois Pines (born 1940), American politician from Massachusetts
- Ned Pines (1906–1990), American publisher
- Ophir Pines-Paz (born 1961), Israeli politician
- Shlomo Pines (1908–1990), Israeli scholar of Jewish and Islamic philosophy
- Yechiel Michel Pines (1824–1913), rabbi and Zionist writer

== Other uses ==
- Pines a name used to shorten Pembroke Pines, Florida
- PINES or Public Information Network for Electronic Services
- Pines (album), a 2012 album by A Fine Frenzy
- Pines (novel), a 2012 novel by Blake Crouch in The Wayward Pines Trilogy
- Pines, Queens, a part of the Little Neck neighborhood in the Queens borough of New York City, New York, United States
- Dipper and Mabel Pines, the main characters of the Disney Channel series Gravity Falls
  - Grunkle Stan (Stanley Pines) and Stanford Pines, Dipper and Mabel's great-uncles in the series

== See also ==
- Town of Pines, Indiana
- The Pines (disambiguation)
- Pine (disambiguation)
- Pinnes (c. 230–217 BC), son of Agron King of Illyria
