= Dinora Pines =

British physician and psychoanalyst

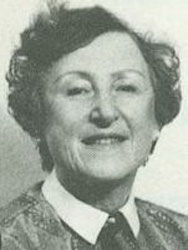
- Born: 30 December 1918; Lutsk, Ukrainian People's Republic
- Died: 26 February 2002 (aged 83)
- Education: London. The Sorbonne.
- Occupations: physician and psychoanalyst
- Spouse: Anthony Lewison
- Children: Kim Lewison

Dinora Pines Lewison (30 December 1918 – 26 February 2002), known by her maiden name Dinora Pines, was a Ukrainian born, British physician and psychoanalyst, who had specific interests in women's psychology and psychosomatic illness.

== Life ==
Pines was born in Lutsk, now in Ukraine, in 1918. Her family moved to Antwerp and her father, Noé Pines, who was an ophthalmic surgeon, was given a medal by the King of Belgium after a successful operation on his eyes. Shortly thereafter her father moved to London as he believed, erroneously, that his qualifications would be accepted there without further retraining. This not being the case he requalified, but not speaking English sufficiently well, he took the exams in Latin. Needing to feed his family and bring them to London he did not go on to take the higher Ophthalmic surgery exams and decided to practice as a General Practitioner, setting up his surgery in the East End of London.

Dinora Pines attended City of London School for Girls and went on to take a degree in Modern Languages at University College London. Qualified in four languages she went to the Sorbonne but returned to England as war broke out.

Between 1940 and 1945 she retrained as a physician and as a student was evacuated to Exeter. During the war she lost family members in the Holocaust in Europe. Pines married Anthony Lewison in 1946 and had two sons. She practiced as a General Practitioner and also ran dermatology clinics at the Elizabeth Garrett Anderson hospital and the South London Hospital for Women and Children

Finding that her patients responded better to talking than to any medicaments prescribed for their skin conditions led her to experiment with an emotional approach to reducing skin problems. She met Hilda Abraham and this led her to an interest in psychology. She enrolled at the Hampstead Child Therapy Course and Clinic in 1959 and she became a qualified psychoanalyst in 1965. She then went into private practice. She was a foundational member of the Brent Adolescent Centre set up by Moe and Egle Laufer and became chair of the B Group at the Institute of Psychoanalysis. She had interests in women's psychology and psychosomatic illness.

Pines was able to donate material to Karl Abraham's biography. He had analysed his daughter, Hilda, when she was six noting details of her reaction to enemas and masturbation. Hilda, who remained a long-standing friend of Dinora Pines, died in 1971 and as the analysis had been passed to Pines she was able to add it to the record of Karl Abraham's work in 1974.

Although she wrote extensively on subjects relating to the inner psychology of women Dinora Pines was also a pioneer in the psychoanalytic treatment of first and second generation survivors of the Holocaust. Her archives are deposited at the Institute of Psychoanalysis London.

== Selected works ==
- Pines, Dinora (December 1972). "Pregnancy and motherhood: interaction between fantasy and reality". British Journal of Medical Psychology. 45 (4): 333–343. doi:10.1111/j.2044-8341.1972.tb02216.x. PMID 4680578.
- Pines, Dinora (February 1980). "Skin communication: Early skin disorders and their effect on transference and countertransference". The International Journal of Psychoanalysis. 61 (3): 315–23. PMID 7440071.
- Pines, Dinora (1982). "The relevance of early psychic development to pregnancy and abortion". The International Journal of Psychoanalysis. 63 (3): 311–9. PMID 7129777.
- Pines, Dinora (1986). "Working with women survivors of the Holocaust: affective experiences in transference and countertransference". The International Journal of Psychoanalysis. 67 (3): 295–307. PMID 3744688.
- Pines, Dinora (1990). "Emotional aspects of infertility and its remedies". The International Journal of Psychoanalysis. 71 (4): 561–68. PMID 2074144.
- Pines, Dinora (1990). "Pregnancy, miscarriage and abortion: a psychoanalytic perspective". The International Journal of Psychoanalysis. 71 (2): 301–07. PMID 2365549.
- Pines, Dinora (1994). A woman's unconscious use of her body. New Haven: Yale University Press. ISBN 978-0300059601.
- Pines, Dinora (1997). Der weibliche Körper: eine psychoanalytische Perspektive (in German). Stuttgart: Klett-Cotta. ISBN 978-3608916652.
