= Pine City =

Pine City may refer to various communities in the United States:

- Pine City, California, a former mining camp
- Pine City, Minnesota
- Pine City Township, Pine County, Minnesota
- Pine City, New York
- Pine City, Oregon
- Pine City, Washington in Malden, Washington
