= Secret profit =

English legal terminology

In English law, a secret profit is a profit made by an employee who uses his employer's premises and business facilities in order to engage in unauthorised trade on his own behalf. A common example is a bar manager who purchases beer from a brewery in his own right and sells it in the bar in competition with, or in preference to, that of his employer. The profit made thereby is a secret profit.

Where the employee deceived a customer before 15 January 2007 he could be prosecuted for obtaining property by deception, the property being the customer's money and the deception that he was selling his employer's produce. Such offences were predicated on the presumption that a customer would not purchase illicit goods were he aware of their true provenance. The offence of obtaining property by deception has since been repealed and is now replaced by the offence of fraud by false representation.

The employee is a constructive trustee of the profit for the employer and the employer has proprietary interest in the profit. Hence, it is theft from the employer and the profit is not merely a civil debt owed by the employee to the employer, according to the case of FHR European Ventures LLP v Cedar Capital Partners LLC [2014] UKSC 45. Where more than one person is involved there could be a conspiracy to defraud and, since the coming into force of the Fraud Act 2006, the employee could be guilty of fraud by abuse of position.

== Bibliography ==
- J. C. S. (1986) "Theft: whether employee received property on account of his employer", Criminal Law Review, 476-379
- Law Commission (2002) Fraud, (Law Com No 276)
- Martin, J. E. (1987) "Constructive trusts of the beer money", Conveyancer and Property Lawyer, 209-211
