= Henry and Martha Litchford House =

Historic house in Raleigh, North Carolina

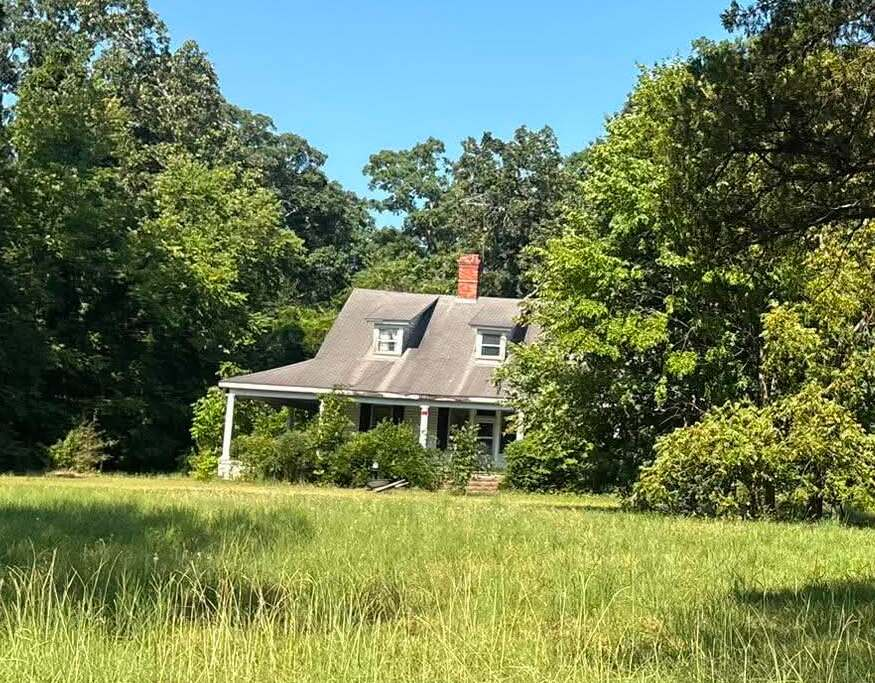
- Litchford House in 2026
- Interactive map of the Henry and Martha Litchford House area
- Alternative names: Pine Ridge Farm; Litchford House

General information
- Type: farmhouse
- Location: 6309 Litchford Road; Raleigh, North Carolina, U.S.
- Coordinates: 35.8661°N 78.5988°W
- Owner: Litchford family (former); Bashford family (former)

The Henry and Martha Litchford House, also known as Pine Ridge Farm, is a historic farmhouse in Raleigh, North Carolina. The house was originally at the center of the 168-acre country estate of Henry and Martha Dancy Litchford.

== History ==
The Henry and Martha Litchford House was built in 1904 near Millbrook, North Carolina by Martha (née Dancy) and Henry Evans Litchford, a banker and president of the Raleigh Chamber of Commerce. The house sat at the center of his 168-acre estate called Pine Ridge Farm in the Neuse River Township and was positioned near the railroad line. It is now located at 6309 Litchford Road in Raleigh, North Carolina.

The Litchfields lived in Raleigh, but used the farmhouse as a summer country home. The couple leased the farm to J. A. Richard or Richardson, a local farmer, who maintained the agricultural operations. The farm produced apples, barley, corn, hay, peaches, and plums. From 1908 to 1910, S. S. Richardson, Mollie Richardson, and Nina Richardson lived at Pine Rige Farm and hosted social events at at the farm.

The Litchfords hosted many gatherings and community events at the farm. In July 1911, Henry Litchford hosted a joint picnic for the Ancient Free and Accepted Masons Neuse Lodge no. 97 and the Junior Order of United American Mechanics Millbrook Council no. 335, an event that included orations and a speech by the North Carolina State Auditor W. P Wood. Martha Litchford hosted events for the Olla Podrida Club, a social and literary society based in Raleigh, who traveled to the farm by train. The Litcfields also hosted the annual picnic and barbeque for more than 100 Boyal-Pearce department store employees and their families, for at least eight years.

In 1913, Litchford took a position with the Old Dominion Trust Company in Richmond, Virginia, and later became president of the Federal Trust Company of Richmond. After the move to Richmond, Mary Litchford and the couple's children continued to use the house as a summer home, returning to North Carolina annually from Virginia. The Litchfords returned to the farm full-time in 1930, upon Henry's retirement. Litchford resumed farming and was elected chair of the Wake County Alcoholic Beverage Control Board, serving from July 1937 to July 1945. Litchford died on July 6, 1946.

In October 1952, Martha Litchford sold the property to J. C. Bashford of Raleigh. She died April 19, 1957. Bashford was a co-founder of Bashford Heating and Plumbing Company with his brother in Raleigh in February 1927. The two brothers also developed Sunset Hills in Raleigh.

Starting in 1953, Bashford, Inc. were developing Pine Forest Farm as the suburban Litchford Forest. Potential buyers could select lots or purches new houses that were under construction. By May 1956, the farm's rural route address had changed to Litchford Road. The Litcford House and Litchford Forest development were annexed into the City of Raleigh in 1974. Bashford's development of the area continued into the 1980s, leaving just over 100 houses and the Litchford House on 3.79 wooded acres.

Because the farmhouse was surrounded by a housing development in the 1950s through the 1980s and nearby Millbrook High School, the house became a local landmark. The City of Raleigh added the house to its Places Worthy of Preservation list for architectural reasons.

In July 2026, a real estate developer petitioned the Raleigh City Council to rezone the Litchford House and its remaining 3.79 acres of land to build 47 townhouses.

== Architecture ==
The Henry and Martha Litchford House is an example of an early-twentieth century vernacular North Carolina farmstead. The site was originally associated with various agricultural buildings, including a barn, corn crib, smoke house, and wagon shelter. The property also included additional house that the Litchfords rented.
