= ISO 26000 =

Set of international standards for social responsibility

ISO 26000 is a set of international standards for social responsibility. It was developed in November 2010 by International Organization for Standardization. The goal of these standards is to contribute to global sustainable development by encouraging business and other organizations to practice social responsibility to improve their impacts on their workers, their natural environments and their communities. The standards were designed to fit into an integrated management system.

An organization's relationship with the society and the environment in which it operates is a critical factor in its ability to continue operating effectively. This standard is used as a measure for an organization's performance as it provides guidance on how it should operate in a socially responsible way.

== Structure ==
The structure of ISO 26000 is as follows:

1. Scope
2. Terms and definitions
3. Understanding social responsibility
4. Principles of social responsibility
5. Recognizing social responsibility and engaging stakeholders
6. Guidance on social responsibility core subjects
7. Guidance on integrating social responsibility throughout an organization.

== Development ==
This standard was developed by ISO/TMBG Technical Management Board - groups. ISO chose the Swedish Standards Institute (SIS) and the Brazilian Association of Technical Standards (ABNT) to provide the joint leadership of the ISO Working Group on Social Responsibility (WG SR). The WG SR was given the task of drafting an International Standard for social responsibility that was published in 2010 as ISO 26000. The 2010 version was reviewed and confirmed by ISO in 2021 and remains current.

== Guidance Standard for All Organizations ==
ISO 26000 offers guidance on socially responsible behavior and possible actions. There are three ways in which it is different from the more widespread standards designed for companies to use to meet particular requirements for activities such as manufacturing, managing, accounting and reporting:

1. ISO 26000 is a guidance standard: it does not contain requirements such as those used when a standard is offered for "certification". There is a certain learning curve associated with using ISO 26000, because there is no specific external reward - certification - explicitly tied to ISO 26000. ISO recommends that users say, for example, that they have "used ISO 26000 as a guide to integrate social responsibility into our values and practices".
2. ISO 26000 is designed for use by all organizations, not only businesses and corporations. Organizations such as hospitals and schools, charities (not-for-profits), etc. are also included. ISO 26000 makes particular efforts to show that its flexibility means that it can be applied by small businesses and other groups as well So far, many of the earliest users of ISO 26000 have been multi-national corporations, especially those based in Europe, and East Asia, particularly Japan.
3. ISO 26000 was developed through a multi-stakeholder process, meeting in eight Working Group Plenary Sessions between 2005 and 2010, with additional committee meetings and consultations on e-mail throughout the five-year process. Approximately five hundred delegates participated in this process, drawn from six stakeholder groups: Industry, Government, NGO (non-governmental organization), Labour, Consumer, and SSRO (Service, Support, Research and Others - primarily academics and consultants). Leadership of various task groups and committees was "twinned" between "developing" and "developed" countries, to ensure viewpoints from different economic and cultural contexts. Since ISO operates on a parliamentary procedure form based on consensus, the final agreed-on standard was the result of deliberation and negotiations; no one group was able to block it, but also no one group was able to achieve its objectives when others strongly disagreed. The goal was to make ISO 26000 accessible and usable by all organizations, in different countries, precisely because it reflects the goals and concerns of each and all of the stakeholder groups in its final compromise form.

== Key Principles and Core Subjects of ISO 26000 ==
The Seven Key Principles, advocated as the roots of socially responsible behavior, are:

- Accountability
- Transparency
- Ethical behavior
- Respect for stakeholder interests (stakeholders are individuals or groups who are affected by, or have the ability to impact, the organization's actions)
- Respect for the rule of law
- Respect for international norms of behavior
- Respect for human rights

The Seven Core Subjects, which every user of ISO 26000 should consider, are:

- Organizational governance
- Human rights
- Labor practices
- Environment
- Fair operating practices
- Consumer issues
- Community involvement and development

Many of the 84 pages of the standard are devoted to definitions, examples, and suggestions on how to identify and communicate with stakeholders, and how to identify and address specific issues in each Core Subject area.

== To Obtain a Copy of ISO 26000 ==
ISO 26000 is available for sale by National Standards Bodies in many countries. Prices are set by the different National Standards Bodies, and vary widely. ISO 26000 is available in many national and international languages, including Arabic, Bulgarian, Czech, Dutch, English, French, German, Indonesian, Italian, Japanese, Kazakh, Korean, Montenegrin, Norwegian, Polish, Portuguese, Romanian, Russian, Serbian, Slovak, Spanish, Swedish, Thai, Vietnamese. ISO 26000 is copyrighted by ISO. See the ISO webpage at ISO - International Organization for Standardization for more information.

== User Guides to ISO 26000 ==
There is a growing number of user guides, many of which are significantly less expensive than the standard itself. Quality and applicability of these guides will vary widely. An assessment tool has been worked out e.g. by The Royal Norwegian Society for Development (Norges Vel), supported by the Asociatia Pentru Implementarea Democratiei (AID -Romania). The ISO's International Workshop Agreement IWA 26:2017 provides guidance on "using ISO 26000:2010 in management systems".

== Certification ==
ISO 26000 has not been developed with the intention for certification. ISO 26000 Scope states "This International Standard is not a management system standard. It is not intended or appropriate for certification purposes or regulatory or contractual use. Any offer to certify, or claims to be certified, to ISO 26000 would be a misrepresentation of the intent and purpose and a misuse of this International Standard. As this International Standard does not contain requirements, any such certification would not be a demonstration of conformity with this International Standard." This statement includes that ISO 26000 cannot be used as basis for audits, conformity tests and certificates, or for any other kind of compliance statements. It can however be used as a statement of intention by the CEO and this is seen as its main value.

The practical value of ISO 26000 has been debated. It might be limited if it merely provided a common understanding of social responsibility instead of also facilitating management routines and practices leading to social responsibility. Despite the non-certifiability, some scholars see distinct elements of a management system standard also in ISO 26000. Against this background, the potential benefits of the new standard, the managerial relevance, and specific limitations of ISO 26000 are currently being discussed. Critiques include the lack of any certification, the potential to "decouple" and isolate corporate social responsibility issues in an organization (Schwarz & Tilling 2009), the difficulty for smaller organizations to access the 100-plus-page "textbook" form of the standard, and the fact that the best practices represented by the standard tend to age; to address at least this last concern, interested parties are tracking the need and timing of a possible update. There is also a concern that ISO 26000 is just one among "too many" social impact reporting standards available to corporations.

As a guidance document the ISO 26000 is an offer, and encourages organizations to discuss their social responsibility issues and possible actions with relevant stakeholders. As service providers, certification bodies do not belong to an organization's stakeholders. ISO 26000 encourages its users to reconsider an organization's social responsibility or "socially responsible behaviour" and to identify/select from its recommendations those where the organization could/should engage in contributions to society. ISO 26000 encourages its users to report to their stakeholders, and get feedback, on actions taken to improve their social responsibility.

It is this identification of "stakeholders" that makes the ISO 26000 an important step forward in solving the dilemma presented by corporations still in pursuit of single bottom line accountability, moving the discussion beyond Triple Bottom Line Accountability. It is also an important step in the development of business-led social responsibility initiatives which evidence suggests is much more effective than government-regulated social responsibly policies.

== See also ==
- Social responsibility
