= Constructive trust =

Type of legal remedy

In trust law, a constructive trust is an equitable remedy imposed by a court to benefit a party that has been wrongfully deprived of its rights due to either a person obtaining or holding a legal property right which they should not possess due to unjust enrichment or interference, or due to a breach of fiduciary duty, which is intercausative with unjust enrichment and/or property interference. It is a type of implied trust (i.e., it is created by conduct, not explicitly by a settlor).

In the United States (in contrast to England), a constructive trust remedy generally does not recognize or create any continuing fiduciary relationship — that is, a constructive trust is not actually a trust except in name. Rather, it is a fiction declaring that the plaintiff has equitable title to the property at issue, and ordering the defendant to transfer legal ownership and possession to the plaintiff. For instance, in some states the slayer rule is implemented in the form of a constructive trust.

== Definition ==
Constructive trusts are imposed by operation of law. They are also referred to as implied trusts. They are not subject to formality requirements. Unlike a resulting trust, which also arises by operation of law, a constructive trust does not give effect to the imputed/presumed intention of the parties.

Instead, constructive trusts are largely said to be triggered by unconscionability. This is the idea that a defendant would be unjustly enriched if they were allowed to keep property for themselves. The main issue with this argument is that we would have to have a really broad approach to unjust enrichment in order for a constructive trust to come under that underpinning concept in order for us to understand constructive trust. This statement is incoherent and without any basis in law or fact.

== Events generating constructive trusts ==
=== Breach of fiduciary duty ===
In a constructive trust the defendant breaches a duty owed to the plaintiff. The most common such breach is a breach of fiduciary duty, such as when an agent wrongfully obtains or holds property owned by a principal. A controversial example is the case of Attorney General for Hong Kong v Reid, in which a senior prosecutor took bribes not to prosecute certain offenders. With the bribe money, he purchased property in New Zealand. His employer, the Attorney-General, sought a declaration that the property was held on constructive trust for it, on the basis of breach of fiduciary duty. The Privy Council awarded a constructive trust. The case is different from Regal (Hastings) Ltd v Gulliver, because there was no interference with a profit-making opportunity that properly belonged to the prosecutor.

Being a Privy Council decision, Reid did not overrule the previous decision of the Court of Appeal of England and Wales in Lister v Stubbs which held the opposite, partially because a trust is a very strong remedy that gives proprietary rights to the claimant not enjoyed by the defendant's other creditors. In the event of the defendant's insolvency, the trust assets are untouchable by the general creditors. Supporters of Lister suggested that there was no good reason to put the victim of wrongdoing ahead of other creditors of the estate. There was a tension in English law between Lister and Reid which was highlighted in Sinclair Investments (UK) Ltd v Versailles Trade Finance Ltd. The United Kingdom Supreme Court subsequently overruled Sinclair in FHR European Ventures LLP v Cedar Capital Partners LLC, holding that Lister was no longer good law.

=== Property interference ===
In Foskett v McKeown a trustee used trust money together with some of his own money to purchase a life insurance policy. Then he committed suicide. The insurance company paid out to his family. The defrauded beneficiaries of the trust sought a declaration that the proceeds were held on constructive trust for them. The House of Lords said that the beneficiaries could choose between either: (a) a constructive trust over the proceeds for the proportion of the life insurance payout purchased with their money; or (b) an equitable lien over the fund for the repayment of that amount.

There is controversy as to what the true basis is of this trust. The House of Lords said that it was to vindicate the plaintiffs' original proprietary rights. However, this reasoning has been criticized as tautologous by some scholars who suggest the better basis is unjust enrichment (see below). This is because there must be a reason why a new property right is created (i.e. the trust) and that must be because otherwise the family would be unjustly enriched by receiving the proceeds of the insurance policy purchased with the beneficiaries' money. "Interference with the plaintiff's property" can justify why the plaintiff can get its property back from a thief, but it cannot explain why new rights are generated in property for which the plaintiff's original property is swapped.

In Foskett v McKeown, the plaintiff's original property was an interest in the trust fund. The remedy they obtained was a constructive trust over an insurance payout. It is not obvious why such a new right should be awarded without saying it is to reverse the family's unjust enrichment.

=== Unjust enrichment ===
In Chase Manhattan Bank NA v Israel-British Bank (London) Ltd one bank paid another bank a large sum of money by mistake (note that the recipient bank did not do anything wrong – it just received money not owed to it). Goulding J held that the money was held on (constructive) trust for the first bank. The reasoning, in this case, has been doubted, and in Westdeutsche Landesbank Girozentrale v Islington London Borough Council the House of Lords distanced itself from the idea that unjust enrichment raises trusts in the claimant's favour. This remains an area of intense controversy.

These types of trusts are called '"institutional" constructive trusts'. They arise the moment the relevant conduct (breach of duty, unjust enrichment etc.) occurs. They can be contrasted with '"remedial" constructive trusts', which arise on the date of judgment as a remedy awarded by the court to do justice in the particular case.

An example is the Australian case Muschinski v Dodds. A de facto couple lived in a house owned by the man. They agreed to make improvements to the property by building a pottery shed for the woman to do arts and crafts work in. The woman paid for part of this. They then broke up. The High Court held that the man held the property on constructive trust for himself and the woman in the proportions in which they had contributed to the improvements to the land. This trust did not arise the moment the woman commenced improvements – that conduct did not involve a breach of duty or an unjust enrichment etc. The trust arose at the date of judgment, to do justice in the case.

In Bathurst City Council v PWC Properties, the High Court that as constructive trusts are the most severe remedy in cases of breach of fiduciary duty, they should only be imposed when other remedies are inappropriate in providing relief.

=== Common intention constructive trusts ===
Common intention constructive trusts were developed to fulfil the reasonable expectations of parties to family property disputes. Equity follows the law, the legal ownership will generally be regarded as the equitable ownership. However, where there are the cohabitants, the other cohabitant (the one who doesn't have title) may consider they have acquired a beneficial ownership interest through their contributions to the family or improvement of the property.

To advance a common intention constructive trust theory, it must be shown that:

- there is an agreement or common intention between the legal owner, on the one hand, and the claimant, on the other, that the owner intended that the claimant have a beneficial interest in the property; and
- the claimant acted in detrimental reliance on that agreement or common intention.

The question of quantum must also be addressed. There is a presumption of equal sharing which can be rebutted if there was common intention to hold the property in different proportions. Following Stack v Dowden equity will look at the entire course of dealing and distribute ownership in the appropriate proportions.

==== Actual, inferred and imputed intention ====
If there is no evidence of actual intention, the courts will search of inferred or imputed intention. In Jones v Kernott the Supreme Court inferred intention to the parties. Therefore, imputed intention involves a lot more judicial discretion, whereas inferred intention is still supposed to be based on the conduct between the parties. This kind of trust is based on bargain between the claimant and the defendant, as opposed to aspects such as proprietary rights which are based on the word of the defendant to the claimant leading to their reliance on the word hence leading to detriment suffered by the claimant.

=== Joint venture ===
The focus here is the joint venture between the claimant and the defendant. For there to be a joint venture it would be unconscionable for the defendant to deny the other party's beneficial interest in the property.

The three main requirements for a joint venture constructive trust are; (1) an arrangement or understanding between the parties; (2) reliance on that arrangement or understanding; and (3) an inconsistent act.

=== Vendor under a specifically enforceable contract for sale ===
The seller holds land on a constructive trust for the purchaser. However, this is limited. In Rayner v Preston the claimant had purchased a property from the defendant, but the house was then destroyed in the fire before they could move in. The defendant received a big payout from the insurance company and refused to give that money to the claimant. It was held that the claimant was not entitled to the payout because it was not the trust property, and because of the nature of the dispute, the trustee only had a low standard of care, particularly when you compare it to an express trustee.

The purchaser also cannot transfer their beneficial interest before receiving legal title.

=== Voluntary transactions made by mistake ===
The court can set aside a gift or disposition where the transfer was made by mistake. The property must have been transferred by deed not an oral agreement.

== Usefulness of constructive trusts ==
For example, if the defendant steals $100,000 from the plaintiff and uses that money to buy a house, the court can trace the house back to the plaintiff's money and deem the house to be held in trust for the plaintiff. The defendant must then convey title to the house to the plaintiff, even if rising property values had appreciated the value of the house to $120,000 by the time the transaction occurred. If the value of the house had instead depreciated to $80,000, the plaintiff could demand a remedy at law (money damages equal to the amount stolen) instead of an equitable remedy.

The situation would be different if the defendant had mixed his own property with that of the plaintiff, for example, adding $50,000 of his own money to the $100,000 stolen from the plaintiff and buying a $150,000 house or using plaintiff's $100,000 to add a room to defendant's existing house. The constructive trust would still be available but in proportion to the contributions, not wholly in the claimant's favour. Alternatively, the claimant could elect for an equitable lien instead, which is like a mortgage over the asset to secure repayment.

Because a constructive trust is an equitable device, the defendant can raise all of the available equitable defenses against it, including unclean hands, laches, detrimental reliance, and undue hardship.

== See also ==
- Constructive trusts in English law
