= Pine Island (Carp Lake, British Columbia) =

Small island in British Columbia, Canada

Coordinates: 54.790°N 123.334°W

Pine Island is a small island in Carp Lake in the Peace River watershed, about 100 km north of Prince George in the province of British Columbia, Canada.
