= The Pines Catholic Camp =

Coordinates: 32.583837°N 94.999403°W

The Pines Catholic Camp is located in Big Sandy, Texas, just north of Tyler and 2 hours east of Dallas, is a Catholic summer camp and retreat center. Accredited by the American Camp Association (ACA), The Pines seeks to “give youth the confidence and the strength they need to continue their faith journey and to help them foster healthy vocations.”

Although not affiliated with any diocese, The Pines has a close relationship with the Roman Catholic Diocese of Dallas and follows their Safe Environment Guidelines.

== Summer Camp Program (May – August) ==
The summer camp program at The Pines is one of the largest and most robust among all the faith-based, Catholic camps in the country. Around 3,500 campers participate in the summer camp program, which begins in late May and runs until early August.

Campers are kept busy all day with many different activities. These activities provide the youth with an opportunity to grow in their faith and friendships in an incredible outdoor setting.

Ages: 7-17 (rising 2nd - 12th grade students)

Sessions: Ten separate one-week sessions, with some opportunities for two-week sessions

Week 1

== Campsite Facilities and Activities ==
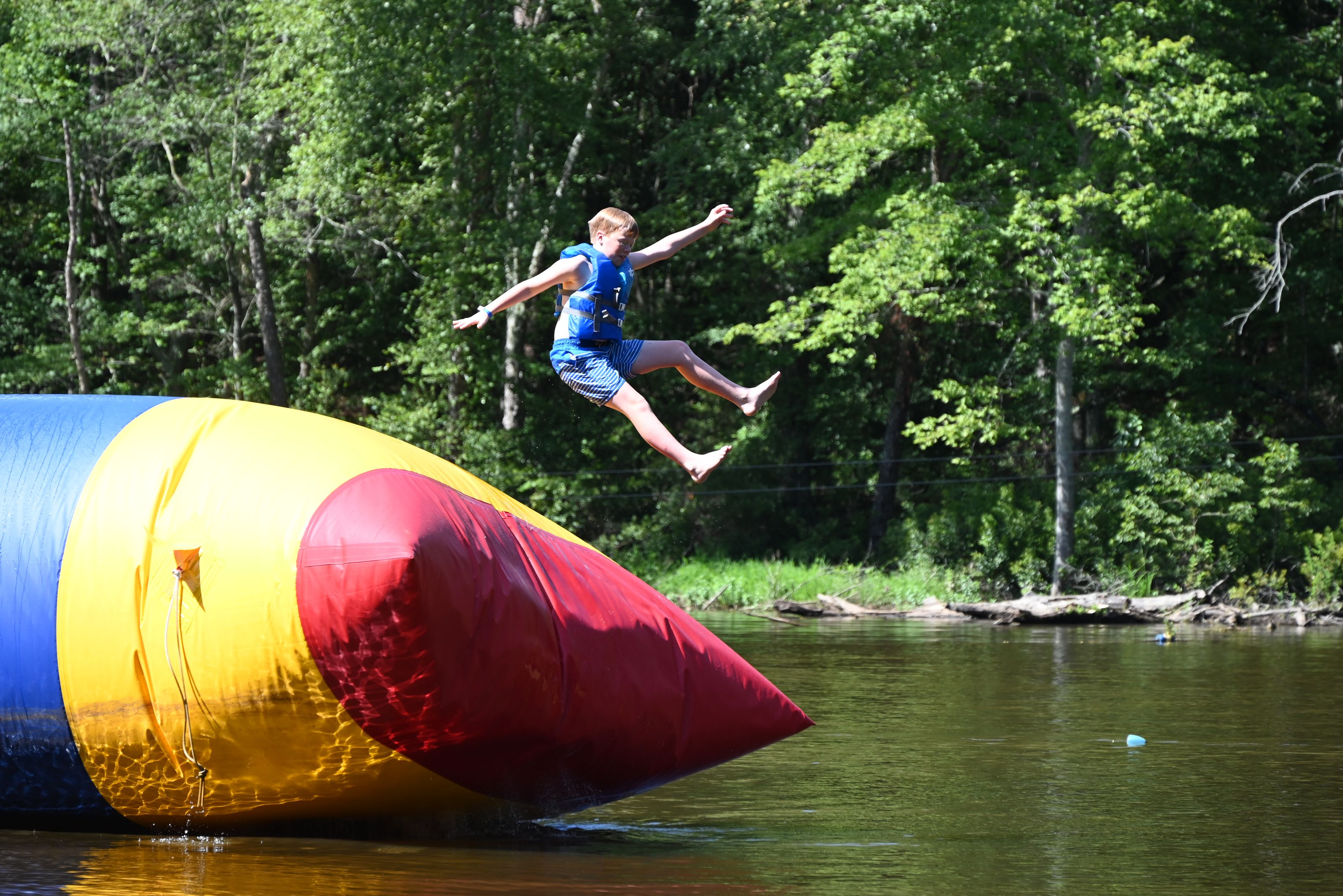

=== Camp Activities ===
- Arts & Crafts
- Low ropes elements
- Double zipline
- Adventure park (high ropes elements)
- Swimming at the pool and lake
- Two slides and diving board at the pool
- Giant waterslide into the lake
- Blob on the lake
- Kayaking and paddleboarding
- Archery tag

=== Sports at Camp ===
- Target sports: Archery and Riflery
- Gaga
- Volleyball
- Basketball
- Eagleball (played by passing a football on a basketball court to the baskets on either side)
- Ultimate Frisbee
- Soccer
- Bouldering
- Climbing wall

== Year-Round Programming (August–May) ==
During the year, The Pines Catholic Camp hosts campers and chaperones for an Environmental Education program, Confirmation Retreats, Spiritual Awakening Programs, Leadership Retreats and Rentals. The Pines' Staff and Missionaries plan, organize, direct, and facilitate these retreats.

=== Environmental Education Program ===
Many Catholic Schools from the Dallas and Tyler Dioceses send their 5th grade students to participate in the Environmental Education Program, where they study Archaeology, Orienteering, Limnology, Entomology, Forestry and Meteorology. The curriculum for this program is focused on the Texas TEKS Most groups also participate in activities on the Challenge Course which consists of high and low elements and is facilitated by certified staff. Together the year-round programs serve over 3,500 youth.

== History ==
The Pines Catholic camp was established in 1988. For six years prior to the founding of the non-profit organization, it operated as an outdoor youth ministry for several Dallas parishes under the direction of co-founder, Executive Director, Bonni Castellaw Brophy and Judi Brophy. Camp Natowa, a Campfire Girls and Boys property in East Texas, was purchased and in June 1989 the first group of campers entered the gates. The 446 campers that first summer came from thirty-seven parishes in four dioceses. Today the summer camp program at The Pines serves over 1,700 youth each summer. Hank Lanik, a current priest in the Diocese of Tyler, became the first full-time Camp Director for The Pines Catholic Camp in 1990 and continued as the Camp Director until 2005.
