= Pine Bluff, West Virginia =

- Unincorporated community
- Location within West Virginia Location within the United States
- Coordinates: 39°25′05″N 80°19′38″W
- Country: United States
- State: West Virginia
- County: Harrison
- Elevation: 951 ft (290 m)
- Time zone: UTC-5 (Eastern (EST))
  - Summer (DST): UTC-4 (EDT)
- Area codes: 304 & 681
- GNIS feature ID: 1555354

Pine Bluff is an unincorporated community in Harrison County, West Virginia, United States. Pine Bluff is 2 miles (3.2 km) northwest of Shinnston.

The community was named for a nearby bluff covered with pine trees.
