= Pine Township =

Pine Township may refer to the following places:

== Arkansas ==
- Pine Township, Cleburne County, Arkansas

== Indiana ==
- Pine Township, Benton County, Indiana
- Pine Township, Porter County, Indiana
- Pine Township, Warren County, Indiana

== Michigan ==
- Pine Township, Michigan

== Missouri ==
- Pine Township, Ripley County, Missouri

== Pennsylvania ==
- Pine Township, Allegheny County, Pennsylvania
- Pine Township, Armstrong County, Pennsylvania
- Pine Township, Mercer County, Pennsylvania
- Pine Township, Lycoming County, Pennsylvania
- Pine Township, Indiana County, Pennsylvania
- Pine Township, Crawford County, Pennsylvania
- Pine Township, Columbia County, Pennsylvania
- Pine Township, Clearfield County, Pennsylvania
