= Kim Lewison =

British judge

The Right Honourable Lord Justice Lewison
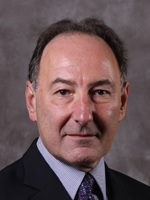

Lord Justice of Appeal
- Incumbent
- Assumed office 4 October 2011
- Monarchs: Elizabeth II; Charles III

High Court judge Chancery Division
- In office 29 April 2003 – 3 October 2011

Personal details
- Born: Kim Martin Jordan Lewison; 1 May 1952 (age 74)
- Education: Downing College, Cambridge
- Occupation: Barrister, judge
- Profession: Lawyer

Sir Kim Martin Jordan Lewison, PC (born 1 May 1952), styled The Rt Hon. Lord Justice Lewison, is a Lord Justice of Appeal. He is a graduate of Downing College, Cambridge, where he is an honorary Fellow.

== Early life and education ==
Lewison was born on 1 May 1952 to Anthony Frederick Lewison and Dinora Lewison (née Pines). He was educated at St Paul's School, an all-boys private school in London. He studied at Downing College, Cambridge.

== Legal career ==
Lewison was called to the bar (Lincoln's Inn) in 1975 and has been a Bencher since 2003. He became a Queen's Counsel in 1991. He was appointed an Assistant Recorder in 1994 and a Recorder in 1997. In 2000, he was appointed a Deputy High Court Judge. He was appointed to the High Court of Justice on 29 April 2003 and assigned to the Chancery Division, receiving the customary knighthood.

The following year, he was appointed to the Competition Appeal Tribunal. Lewison served as Chancery Supervising Judge from 2007 to 2009. On 3 October 2011, he was appointed a Lord Justice of Appeal, and received the customary appointment to the Privy Council.
