= Ground pine =

Ground pine or ground-pine may refer to:

- Ajuga, a genus of herbaceous flowering plants in the mint family Lamiaceae, with most species native to Europe, Asia, and Africa; also, specifically:
  - Ajuga chamaepitys, also known as yellow bugle, native to Europe, the Eastern part of the Mediterranean, and North Africa
- Diphasiastrum complanatum (syn. Lycopodium complanatum), also known as northern running-pine, a species of clubmoss native to dry coniferous forests throughout the Holarctic Kingdom
- Dendrolycopodium, a genus of clubmosses in the family Lycopodiaceae, a family of fern-allies; also, specifically:
  - Dendrolycopodium obscurum, also known as princess pine, native to eastern North America
