= Pine Island National Wildlife Refuge =

United States National Wildlife Refuge in Florida

- IUCN category V (protected landscape/seascape)
- Location within Florida Location within the United States
- Location: Lee County, Florida, United States
- Nearest city: Cape Coral, Florida
- Coordinates: 26°39′45″N 82°13′36″W
- Area: 601 acres (2.43 km^{2})
- Established: September 15, 1908
- Governing body: US Fish & Wildlife Service
- Website: Pine Island National Wildlife Refuge

The Pine Island National Wildlife Refuge is part of the United States National Wildlife Refuge System, located on the southwest coast of Florida south of Charlotte Harbor, north of Sanibel Island in Pine Island Sound on La Costa Island. The 601-acre (2.43 km^{2}) refuge was established on September 15, 1908. It is administered as part of the J. N. "Ding" Darling National Wildlife Refuge Complex.
