= Pine Island Ridge, Florida =

- neighborhood
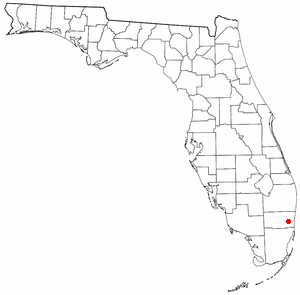
- Location of Pine Ridge, Florida
- Coordinates: 26°5′42″N 80°16′26″W
- Country: United States
- State: Florida
- County: Broward

Area
  - Total: 0.77 sq mi (2.0 km^{2})
  - Land: 0.77 sq mi (2.0 km^{2})
  - Water: 0 sq mi (0.0 km^{2})
- Elevation: 6.6 to 29.5 ft (2 to 9 m)

Population (2000)
  - Total: 5,199
  - Density: 6,648/sq mi (2,566.9/km^{2})
- Time zone: UTC-5 (Eastern (EST))
  - Summer (DST): UTC-4 (EDT)
- FIPS code: 12-56855
- GNIS feature ID: 1867186

Pine Island Ridge was a census-designated place (CDP) in Broward County, Florida, United States. The population was 5,199 at the 2000 census. Formerly a part of unincorporated Broward County, Pine Island Ridge was annexed into the town of Davie, Florida on the 15th of September 2006, and is now a neighborhood of that town.

The natural area was once the site of hunting camps of the Tequesta Native American tribe, as well as a refuge for the Seminoles during the Second Seminole War (1835-1842).

Broward County purchased Pine Island Ridge in 1989 as part of the $75 million Environmentally Sensitive Lands Bond Issue.

== Geography ==
Pine Island Ridge is located at 26°5′42″N 80°16′26″W (26.094927, -80.273884).

According to the United States Census Bureau, the CDP has a total area of .79 square miles (2.05 km^{2}). .78 square miles (2.02 km^{2}) of it is land and .01 square miles (0.03 km^{2}) is water (1.27%).

Pine Island Ridge contains the highest natural point in Broward County—29 feet (9 meters) above sea level.

== Demographics ==
As of the census of 2000, there were 5,199 people, 2,882 households, and 1,504 families residing in the CDP. The population density was 6,648.1/mi^{2} (2,573.5/km^{2}). There were 3,265 housing units at an average density of 4,175.1/mi^{2} (1,616.2/km^{2}). The racial makeup of the CDP was 94.67% White (86.2% were Non-Hispanice White,) 1.21% African American, 0.08% Native American, 1.50% Asian, 0.02% Pacific Islander, 1.12% from other races, and 1.40% from two or more races. Hispanic or Latino of any race were 10.33% of the population.

There were 2,882 households, out of which 11.5% had children under the age of 18 living with them, 42.0% were married couples living together, 8.0% had a female householder with no husband present, and 47.8% were non-families. 42.9% of all households were made up of individuals, and 24.1% had someone living alone who was 65 years of age or older. The average household size was 1.80 and the average family size was 2.41.

In the CDP, the population was spread out, with 10.3% under the age of 18, 4.0% from 18 to 24, 18.9% from 25 to 44, 24.6% from 45 to 64, and 42.2% who were 65 years of age or older. The median age was 59 years. For every 100 females, there were 76.2 males. For every 100 females age 18 and over, there were 73.1 males.

The median income for a household in the CDP was $35,476, and the median income for a family was $43,533. Males had a median income of $46,382 versus $31,494 for females. The per capita income for the CDP was $25,533. About 1.8% of families and 3.5% of the population were below the poverty line, including 3.6% of those under age 18 and 2.3% of those age 65 or over.

As of 2000, English as a first language accounted for 81.91% of all residents, while Spanish accounted for 12.90%, Yiddish made up 2.03%, German was at 1.52%, and both French and Italian were the mother tongues for 0.81% of the population.
