= English personal property law =

Law in England

English personal property law is a branch of English property law concerned with non-land based property interests.

== History ==
The division of property into real and personal represents the division into immovable and movable incidentally recognized in Roman law and generally adopted since. "Things personal", according to Blackstone, "are goods, money, and all other movables which may attend the owner's person wherever he thinks proper to go" (Comm. ii. 16). This identification of things personal with movables does not express the English law, owing to the anomalous position of chattels real. In England, real property is supposed to be superior in dignity to personal property, which was originally of little importance from a legal point of view. This view is the result of feudal ideas, and had no place in the Roman system, in which immovables and movables were dealt with as far as possible in the same manner, and descended according to the same rules.

== Types ==
Personal estate is divided in English law into chattels real and chattels personal; the latter are again divided into choses in possession and choses in action.

Interest in personal property may be either absolute or qualified. The latter case is illustrated by animals ferae naturae, in which property is only coextensive with detention. Personal property may be acquired by occupancy (including the accessio, commixtio, and confusio of Roman law), by invention, as patent and copyright, or by transfer, either by the act of the law (as in bankruptcy, judgment and intestacy), or by the act of the party (as in gift, contract and will).

There are several cases in which, by statute or otherwise, property is taken out of the class of real or personal to which it seems naturally to belong. By the operation of the equitable doctrine of conversion money directed to be employed in the purchase of land, or land directed to be turned into money, is in general regarded as that species of property into which it is directed to be converted. An example of property prima facie (on the face of it) real which is treated as personal is an estate pur autre vie, which, since the Common Recoveries, etc. Act 1740 (14 Geo. 2. c. 20), s. 9 (now replaced by the Wills Act 1837, s. 6) is distributable as personal property in the absence of a special occupant. Examples of property prima facie personal which is treated as real are fixtures, heirlooms, such as deeds to unregistered or foreign property in land (where these therefore improve or guarantee title) and family portraits, whereas shares in some of the older companies, such as the New River Company, are real estate by statute, requiring formalities such as a deed to pass them. In ordinary cases, which are the vast majority, shares in companies are personal property, unless the shareholders have individually some interest in the land as land. As to company shares for co-ownership leasing to co-tenants (co-leaseholders) such as where the owners wish to hold in such a way or exceed the number (4) the Land Registry will permit, or charitable companies, the property in the form of shares is hybrid real-personal – a completed stock transfer form rarely meets the law, and/or company's own articles as filed at its registry, to guarantee to pass the shares if not to the new owner of the land or (as to charities) charitable trusteeship it is associated with. A second real and equitable point is the addition of the owner's spouse to the leasehold will create an equitable interest, to the same percentage, in any share in the freehold which the linked share affords (in England this is an equitable incident of marriage rather than any more termed "dower"). Likewise the absence of blood or named heirs to any share at all (but not charities co-held by others) means it may surrender to the nation (escheat, become bona vacantia). A deed (such as transfer deed and/or deed of appointment (and retirement)) is not needed to transfer a co-freehold company's shares, unless it is subject to a governing trust or the articles say so.

== Comparison to real property ==
The main differences between real and personal property which still exist in England are these.

1. In real property there can be nothing more than limited ownership; there can be no estate properly so called in personal property, and it may be held in complete ownership. There is nothing corresponding to an estate-tail in personal property; words which in real property would create an estate-tail will give an absolute interest in personalty. A life-interest may, however, be given in personalty, except in articles quae ipso usu consumuntur. Limitations of personal property, equally with those of real property, fall within the rule against perpetuities.
2. Personal property is not subject to various incidents of real property, such as rent, dower or escheat.
3. On the death of the owner intestate real property descends to the heir; personal property is divided according to the Statute of Distributions.
4. Real property as a general rule must be transferred by deed; personal property does not need so solemn a mode of transfer.
5. Contracts relating to real property must be in writing by the Statute of Frauds (29 Cha. 2. c. 3), s. 4; contracts relating to personal property need only be in writing when it is expressly so provided by statute, as, for instance, in the cases falling under section 17 of the Statute of Frauds.
6. A will of lands need not be proved, but a will of personalty or of personal and real property together must be proved in order to give a title to those claiming under it.
7. Devises of real estate fall as a rule within the Mortmain Acts; bequests of personal property, other than chattels real, are not within the act.
8. Mortgages of real property need not generally be registered; mortgages of personal property for the most part require registration under the Bills of Sale Acts (see Pledge, and Bill of sale).

== Comparison to Scots law ==
The terms heritable and movable of Scots law to a great extent correspond with the real and personal of English law. The main points of difference are these.

1. Leases are heritable as to the succession to the lessee, unless the destination expressly exclude heirs, but are movable as to the fisk.
2. Money due on mortgages and securities on land is personalty in England. At common law in Scotland debts secured on heritable property are themselves heritable. But by the Titles to Land Consolidation (Scotland) Act 1868, s. 117, heritable securities are movable as far as regards the succession of the creditor, unless executors are expressly excluded. They still, however, remain heritable quoad fiscum, as between husband and wife, in computing legitim, and as far as regards the succession of the debtor.
3. Up to 1868 the heir of heritage succeeded to certain movable goods called heirship movables, which bore a strong likeness to the heirlooms of English law. This right of the heir was abolished by the Titles to Land Consolidation (Scotland) Act 1868, s. 160.
4. Annuities, as having tractum futuri temporis, are heritable, and an obligation to pay them falls upon the heir of the deceased.

== Comparison to US ==
The law in the United States agrees in most respects with that of England. Heirlooms are unknown, one reason being, no doubt, that the importance of title-deeds is much less than it is in England, owing to the operation of the Registration Acts. Long terms in some states have annexed to them the properties of freehold estates. In some states, estates pur autre vie descend like real property; in others an estate pur autre vie is deemed a freehold only during the life of the grantee; after his death it becomes a chattel real. In yet other states, the heir has a scintilla of interest as special occupant. In some states, railway rolling stock is considered as purely personal; in others, it has been held to be a fixture, and so to partake of the nature of real property. Shares in some of the early American corporations were, like New River shares in England, made real estate by statute, as in the case of the Cape Sable Company in Maryland. In Louisiana, animals employed in husbandry are, and slaves were, regarded as immovables. Pews in churches are generally real property, but in some states they are made personal property by statute. The assignment of choses in action is generally permitted, and is in most states regulated by statute.

== Cases ==
- Carrier's Case (1473) 13 Edw. IV, f. 9, pl. 5 (Star Ch. and Exch. Ch.) - on the crime of larceny.
- Armory v Delamirie (1722) K.B., 1 Strange 505, 93 ER 664
- Waverley Borough Council v Fletcher [1995] 4 All ER 756, council had the better right to a brooch found on its land
- Parker v British Airways Board [1982] 1 QB 1004, the finder of a bracelet in Heathrow airport could keep it and the Board did not own it
- Dearle v Hall (1828) 3 Russ 1
- R v Knowles, ex parte Somersett (Somersett's Case) (1772) 20 State Tr 1; (1772) Lofft 1 - concerning the illegality of property in people (i.e. slavery) in England.
- Thomas v Times Book Company [1966] 1 WLR 911, requirement to make a gift is a true intention, so a person told he could keep the manuscript of a play "if he could find it" was a gift

== See also ==
- English land law
- Trusts in English law
