= Jones v Kernott =

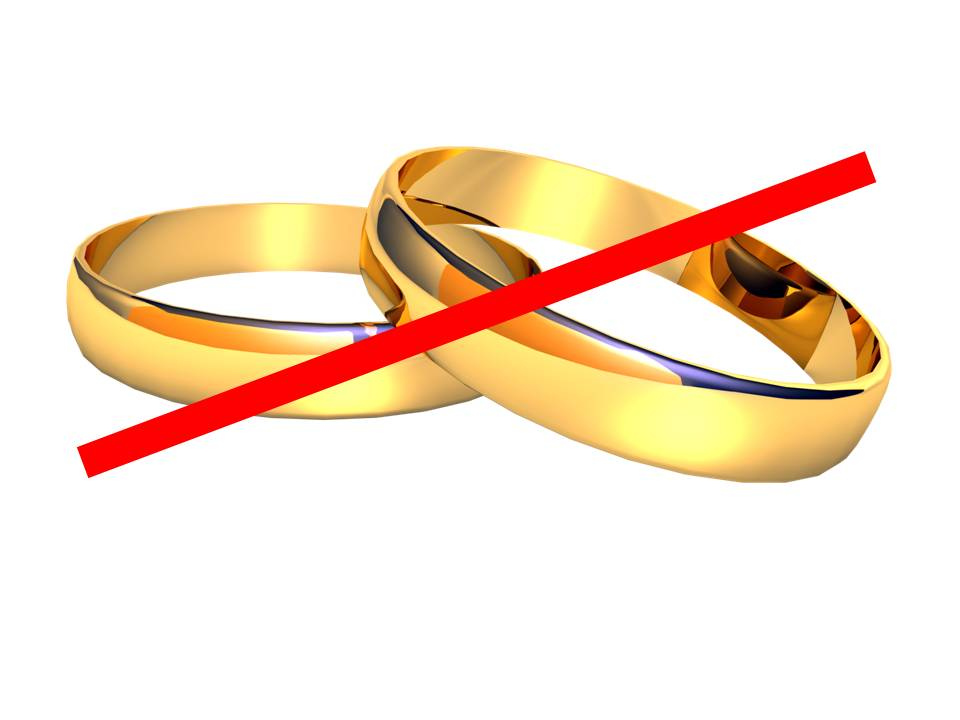
- Court: Supreme Court of the United Kingdom
- Decided: 9 November 2011
- Citation: [2011] UKSC 53

Case history
- Prior actions: [2010] EWCA Civ 578, [2010] 1 WLR 2401, [2010] 3 All ER 423, [2010] 2 FLR 1631, [2010] 2 FCR 372, with Wall LJ, Rimer LJ and Jacob LJ (dissenting)

Court membership
- Judges sitting: Lord Walker, Lady Hale, Lord Collins, Lord Kerr and Lord Wilson

Keywords
- Beneficial interests, Cohabitation, Contributions, Co-ownership, Intention, Unmarried couples, English land law, English family law

Jones v Kernott [2011] UKSC 53 is a decision by the UK Supreme Court concerning the beneficial entitlement to a co-owned family home under a constructive trust. The court ruled there was a 90:10 split of ownership in favour of the main child-caring partner who contributed 80% of the equity to the home in which she lived. The non-resident partner had also ceased to pay bills and maintenance for the children for a considerable time.

== Facts ==
Ms Jones and Mr Kernott met in 1980. In 1981 Ms Jones bought a caravan with the help of a bank loan, and in 1984 Mr Kernott moved into the caravan with her upon the birth of their first child. In May 1985 Ms Jones sold her caravan, and the parties bought 39 Badger Hall Avenue, Thundersley in Essex, for £30,000. Ms Jones contributed £6,000, and the balance was raised by an interest-only mortgage. The house was conveyed into their joint names. From this point on they shared payment of the household bills and the mortgage. In 1986 the couple's second child was born. The parties took out a loan for £2,000 for an extension which was mostly constructed by Mr Kernott.

In 1993 the couple separated, and Mr Kernott left Badger Hall Avenue. He stopped paying his share of the bills, and contributed little or nothing towards the maintenance of the children. In May 1996 the parties cashed in a life insurance policy and divided the proceeds. With his share of these Mr Kernott bought 114 Stanley Road, Benfleet in Essex, for £57,000.

In May 2006 Mr Kernott sought payment (realisation) of his alleged half-share in Badger Hall Avenue. Ms Jones responded by claiming under the Trusts of Land and Appointment of Trustees Act 1996 (TOLATA) for a declaration that she owned the entire beneficial interest in the property. Judge Dedman, after considering Oxley v Hiscock [2005] Fam 211 and Stack v Dowden [2007] 2 AC 432, held that while the interests of the parties at the outset might well have been that the property should be split jointly, those intentions had altered significantly over the years. He considered that the correct test was therefore what was "fair and just" between the parties, taking into account the whole course of dealing between them. He concluded, taking into account Mr Kernott's ceasing to pay any bills, the fact that Ms Jones contributed over 80% of the equity, and the lack of assistance provided by Mr Kernott relating to the maintenance of the children, that the correct split would be 90:10 in favour of Ms Jones.

== Judgment ==
=== High Court ===
The appeal from the decision of Judge Dedman in the Southend-on-Sea County Court on 21 April 2008 was heard on 12 May 2009, judgment handed down on 10 July 2009, by Mr Nicholas Strauss QC in the High Court of Justice, Chancery Division who dismissed the appeal, as before awarding beneficiary shares in the Badger Hall Avenue house to Jones and Kernott in the ratio of 90:10.

=== Court of Appeal ===
On 26 May 2010, Her Majesty's Court of Appeal in England upheld the appeal, finding that the house was held in shares of 50/50. Rimer LJ gave the judgment.

=== Supreme Court ===
On 9 November 2011, the Supreme Court of the United Kingdom, overturning the Court of Appeal, held that Mr Kernott and Ms Jones would hold the shares in the house on trust in a ratio of 10% to 90%, to reflect their contributions to the home. Although the Supreme Court unanimously reached the decision, their Lordships concurred on different grounds. Lord Walker, Lady Hale and Lord Collins concluded that there are situations where it would be permissible to impute common intention, while Lord Kerr and Lord Wilson preferred to base their opinions on the fact that the court had the discretion to acknowledge constructive trust in such a manner because it was fair.

Lord Kerr said the following.

76. Lord Walker and Lady Hale have concluded that the failure of the parties to sell their home in Badger Hall Avenue in late 1995, leading as it did to the cashing in of the life insurance policy, meant that Mr Kernott intended that his interest in the Badger Hall Avenue property should crystallise then. That may indeed have been his intention but, for my part, I would find it difficult to infer that it actually was what he then intended. As the deputy High Court judge, Nicholas Strauss QC put it in para 48 of his judgment, the bare facts of his departure from the family home and acquisition of another property are a slender foundation on which to conclude that he had entirely abandoned whatever stake he had in the previously shared property. 77. On the other hand, I would have no difficulty in concluding, as did Mr Strauss and as would Lord Wilson, that it was eminently fair that the property should be divided between the parties in the shares decreed by Judge Dedman. Like Lord Wilson, therefore, I would prefer to allow this appeal on the basis that it is impossible to infer that the parties intended that their shares in the property be apportioned as the judge considered they should be but that such an intention should be imputed to them.

Lord Wilson said the following.

87. The problem has lain in Lady Hale's third sentence. Where equity is driven to impute the common intention, how can it do so other than by search for the result which the court itself considers fair? The sentence was not obiter dictum so rightly, under our system, judges below the level of this court have been unable to ignore it. Even in these proceedings judges in the courts below have wrestled with it. Mr Strauss observed, at para 31, that it was difficult to see how – at that final stage of the inquiry – the process could work without the court's supply of what it considered to be fair. In his judgment on the second appeal Lord Justice Rimer went so far as to suggest, at para 77, that Lady Hale's third sentence must have meant that, contrary to appearances, she had not intended to recognise a power to impute a common intention at all.

88. I respectfully disagree with Lady Hale's third sentence.

89. Lord Walker and Lady Hale observe, at para 34 above, that in practice the difference between inferring and imputing a common intention to the parties may not be great. I consider that, as a generalisation, their observation goes too far – at least if the court is to take (as in my view it should) an ordinarily rigorous approach to the task of inference. Indeed in the present case they conclude, at paras 48 and 49, that, in relation to Chadwick LJ's second question the proper inference from the evidence, which, if he did not draw, the trial judge should have drawn, was that the parties came to intend that the proportions of the beneficial interests in the home should be held on a basis which in effect equates to 90% to Ms Jones and to 10% to Mr Kernott (being the proportions in favour of which the judge ruled). As it happens, reflective perhaps of the more rigorous approach to the task of inference which I prefer, I regard it, as did Mr Strauss at [48] and [49] of his judgment, as more realistic, in the light of the evidence before the judge, to conclude that inference is impossible but to proceed to impute to the parties the intention that it should be held on a basis which equates to those proportions. At all events I readily concur in the result which Lord Walker and Lady Hale propose.

== See also ==
- English land law
- Dyer v Dyer (1788) 2 Cox 92
- Pettitt v Pettitt [1970] AC 777
- Burns v Burns [1984] Ch 317
- Abbott v Abbott [2007] UKPC 53
- Geary v Rankine [2012] EWCA 555
