= Stack v Dowden =

Leading English property law case

- Court: House of Lords
- Decided: 25 April 2007
- Citations: [2007] UKHL 17; [2007] 2 AC 432; [2007] 2 WLR 831; [2007] 2 All ER 929

Court membership
- Judges sitting: Lord Hoffmann, Lord Hope, Lord Walker, Baroness Hale and Lord Neuberger

Keywords
- Constructive trust, family home, resulting trust

Stack v Dowden [2007] UKHL 17 is a leading English property law case concerning the division of interests in family property after the breakdown of a cohabitation relationship.

== Facts ==
Mr Stack and Ms Dowden were in a long-term relationship with four children, though they had never married. They had almost always kept their respective financial affairs separate. When they moved home in 1993 they registered the new house in their joint names, but did not specify on the Land Registry Form what their respective shares were. Generally, this would mean a presumption that they would share the property equally. However, in this case 65% of the purchase price had been provided by Ms Dowden (largely from the sale of their previous home which was in her sole name, and from her investments), and 35% by Mr Stack (who had lived in the previous home for 10 years and had made numerous improvements to it).

Nine years after purchasing the house, their relationship broke down and they agreed a court order to the effect that Mr Stack would move out and that Ms Dowden would pay for his alternative accommodation. Mr Stack then sought a declaration that the house was held upon trust by the couple as tenants in common, and an order for its sale.

The High Court declared that they owned the property in equal shares. Ms Dowden appealed.

=== Legal documents relating to the property ===
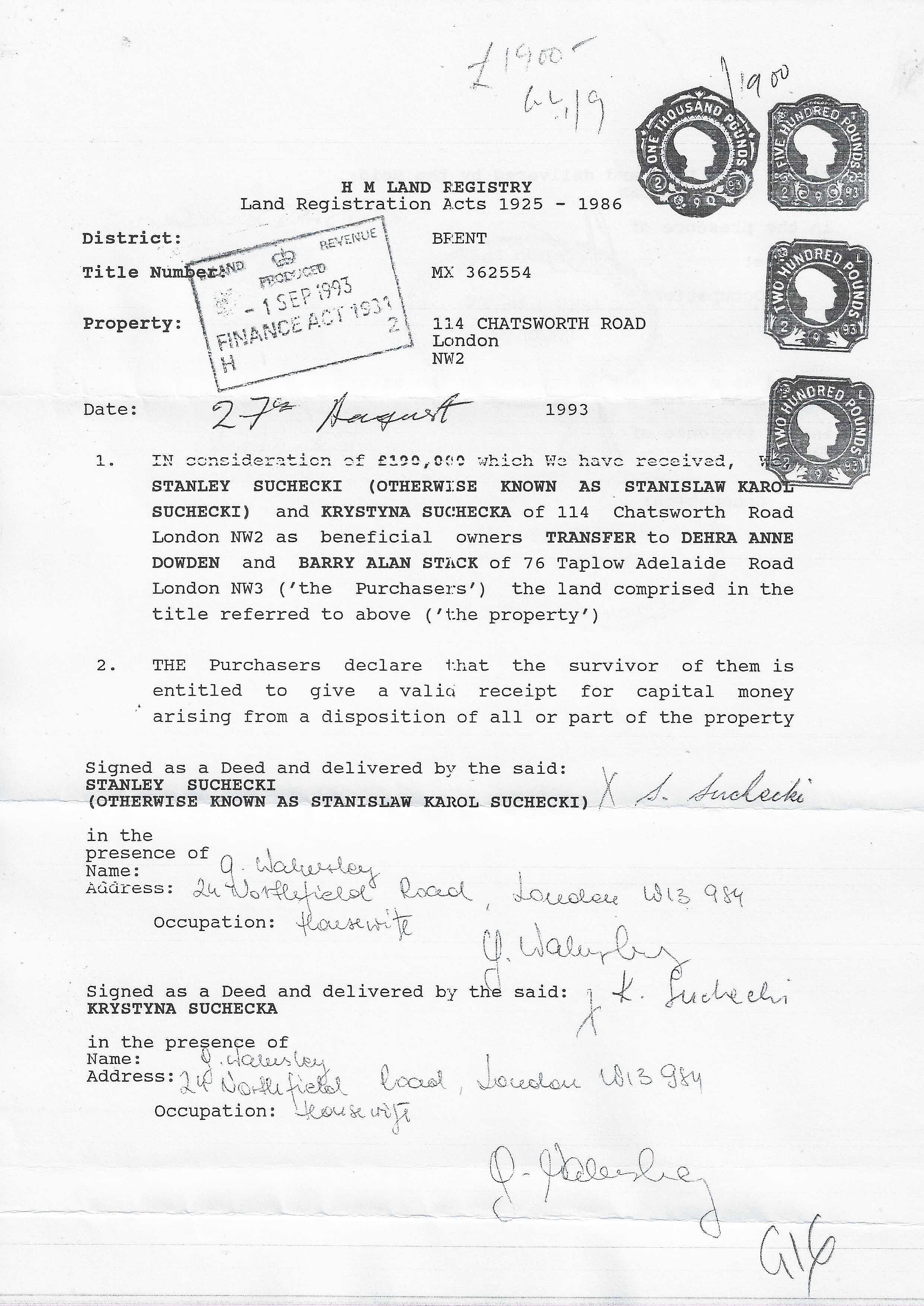

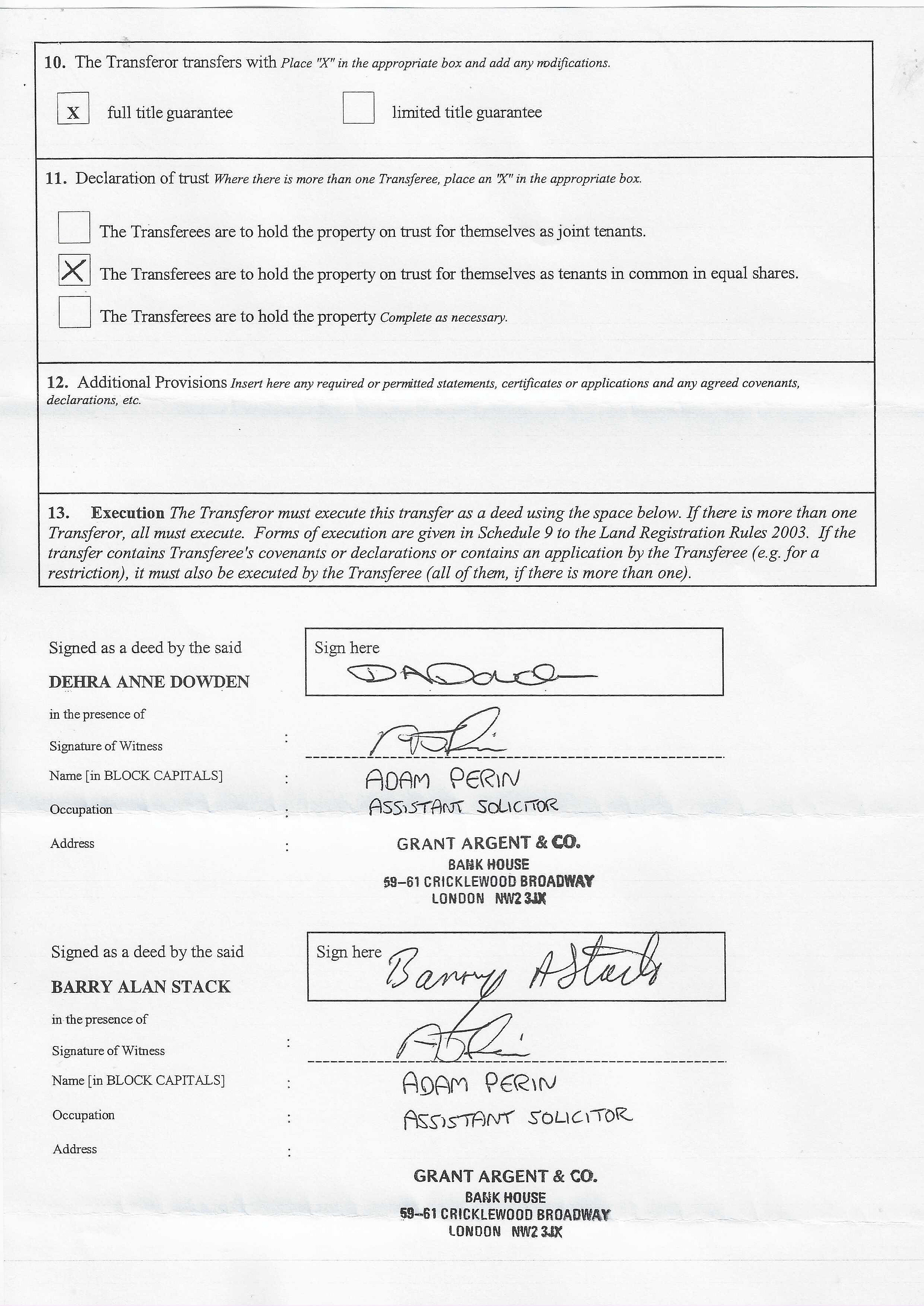

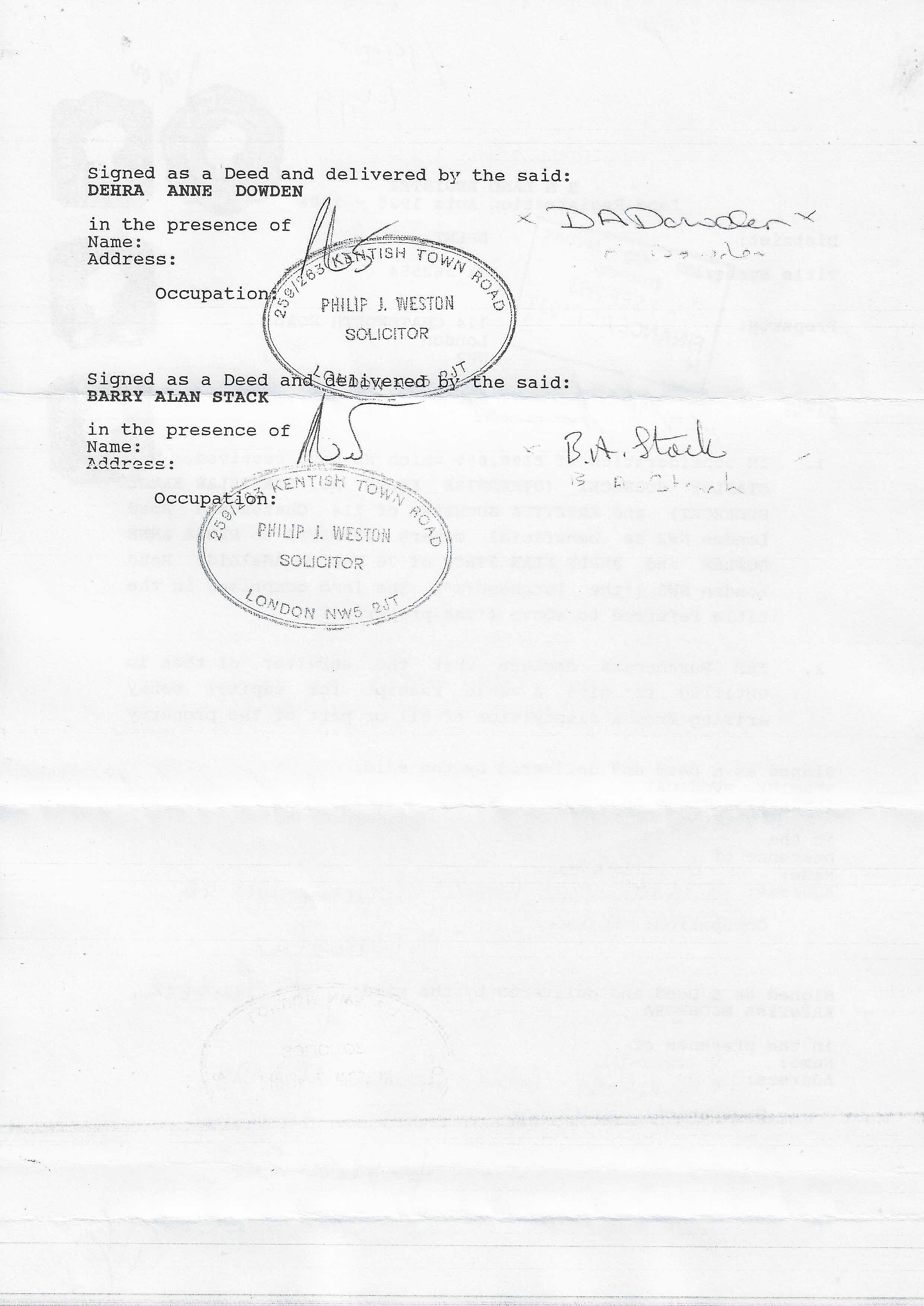

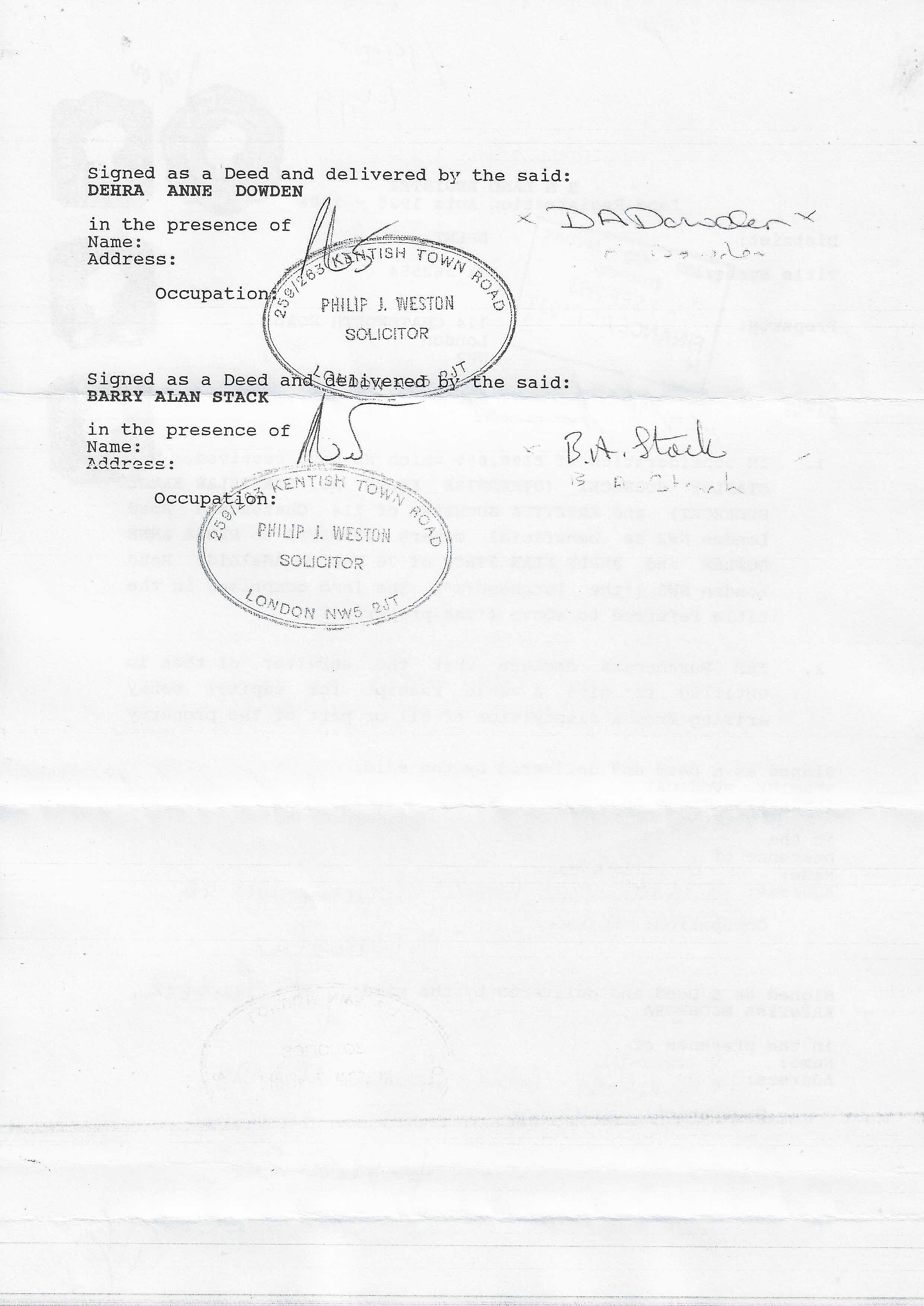

== Judgment ==
=== Court of Appeal ===
The Court of Appeal overturned the High Court and ordered that the net proceeds be divided 65 per cent to Ms Dowden and 35 per cent to Mr Stack. The declaration as to the receipt for capital money in the transfer document could not be taken as an express declaration of trust, nor could it infer an intention that the beneficial ownership be equal, because there was no evidence that either of them had understood the declaration to carry such significance. The issues were whether a conveyance into joint names established a prima facie case of joint and equal beneficial interests and whether the Court of Appeal had been correct to overrule the judge's order that Ms Dowden compensate Mr Stack for the cost of his accommodation. Mr Stack appealed.

=== House of Lords ===
The House of Lords held that Ms Dowden owned a greater share than half the equity, and so although she and Mr Stack were joint tenants of the legal estate, Ms Dowden was entitled to a 65 per cent interest. Lord Hoffmann said he concurred with Baroness Hale. Lord Hope, gave a short judgment also concurring with Baroness Hale. He emphasised that, departing from Lloyds Bank plc v Rosset, when deciding whether a constructive trust existed,

... indirect contributions, such as making improvements which added significant value to the property, or a complete pooling of resources in both time and money so that it did not matter who paid for what during their relationship, ought to be taken into account as well as financial contributions made directly towards the purchase of the property.

Therefore, because the couple had maintained their financial independence from each other throughout their relationship, Lord Hope reasoned that the appeal should be dismissed.

Lord Walker, agreeing with the reasons given by Baroness Hale, was also of the opinion that the appeal should be dismissed.

Baroness Hale said that the onus is upon the person seeking to show that the beneficial ownership is different from the legal ownership and that the key question in cases such as this is “did the parties intend their beneficial interests to be different from their legal interests?”, although she acknowledged that cases of this type would be very unusual. She stated that, contrary to Lloyd's Bank plc v Rosset, many factors other than financial contributions may be relevant to divining the parties' true intentions, such as any discussions at the time of the transfer which cast light upon their intentions; the reasons why the home was acquired in their joint names; the nature of their relationship; whether they had children for whom they both had responsibility to provide a home; how the purchase was financed, both the initial purchase price and the subsequent mortgage payments; how the parties arranged their finances, whether separately or together or a bit of both; how they discharged their household expenses. Baroness Hale stated that these and other factors should be taken into account when deciding whether the parties' beneficial interests should be different from their legal interests and whether a constructive trust existed.

Because the parties had kept their finances rigidly separate, Baroness Hale was of the opinion that, taking their entire course of conduct into account, the appeal by Mr Stack should be dismissed and the Court of Appeal's order of a 65/35 split in favour of Ms Dowden should stand. She further stated that the court can look at other elements such as the purpose for which the home was acquired, whether the parties have children for whom they both have a responsibility to provide a home, and how they managed outgoings on the property and other household expenses.

There cannot be many unmarried couples who have lived together for as long as this, who have had four children together, and whose affairs have been kept as rigidly separate as this couple's affairs were kept. This is all strongly indicative that they did not intend their shares, even in the property which was put into both their names, to be equal.

Lord Neuberger, dissenting in his reasoning (but not on the result of the 65 to 35 per cent split), advised against easy and frequent changes to law (especially by the judiciary rather than Parliament) that might give rise to new and unforeseen uncertainties and unfairnesses. He advocated the use of the resulting trust where evidence of factors other than direct financial contributions were absent and expressed concern about imputing intentions to the parties rather than inferring their intentions in light of their actions and statements - the former involves concluding what the parties would have intended whereas the latter involves concluding what they did intend. Lord Neuberger held that there were no grounds for varying the 65/35 split which he believed originated on the acquisition of the property and the establishment of a resulting trust. He was of the opinion that nothing other than "subsequent discussions, statements or actions, which can fairly be said to imply a positive intention to depart from that apportionment, will do to justify a change in the way in which the beneficial interest is owned." He thought that the facts that they lived together for a long time, have been in a loving relationship, have children, operated a joint bank account and shared the outgoings of the household could not of themselves indicate an intention to vary this unequal split, and that even payments on decoration, repairs, utilities and council tax did not suffice on their own without evidence of an express agreement to vary their shares. He stated that the appeal should be dismissed.

== See also ==
- English land law
- English trusts law
- English property law
- Dyer v Dyer (1788) 2 Cox 92
- Pettitt v Pettitt [1970] AC 777
- Burns v Burns [1984] Ch 317
- Oxley v Hiscock [2004] EWCA Civ 546
- Hapeshi v Allnatt [2010] EWHC 392 (Ch)
- Abbott v Abbott [2007] UKPC 53
- Jones v Kernott [2012] 1 All ER 1265, [2011] Fam Law 1338
- Geary v Rankine [2012] EWCA 555
