= Brown v Raindle =

- Citation: (1796) 3 Ves 296, 30 ER 998

Keywords
- Co-ownership

Brown v Raindle (1796) 30 ER 998 is an English land law case, concerning co-ownership of land. It confirmed that equity will not, in copyhold land for example, generally allow a widow the right to remain in a property where a mortgage remains in arrears.

== Facts ==
This was a standard repossession action. The legal question arose as to enforcing repossession against a widow — would it have to wait as with the rights of the lord of the manor in the custom of that manor, under the copyhold system, until her demise.

As such a bill was filed for foreclosure, and to compel a surrender of a copyhold estate for three lives, under a covenant in the mortgage deed of 1792 (to surrender those premises as an additional security). Did a covenant of the mortgagor bar the right of his widow "to free-bench"? The custom of the manor appeared by the evidence to be, that the copyholder could convey these estates by surrender; but where he dies seised of the estate, the widow "is entitled to the estate during her widowhood as her free-bench".

== Judgment ==
Sir RP Arden said the following in his judgment.

I had occasion lately to look into that case. I had no doubt about it. It is perfectly clear. The right of the widow of a copyholder arising out of her estate, which is in his power during his life, may be barred by him by any act done for valuable consideration; whether conveying a legal estate, or otherwise. It is very different from an estate-tail with remainders over; for those estates are not in the power of the party, till the recovery is suffered. They are estates not arising out of the estate of the tenant in tail. Upon the evidence, supposing this a widow's estate arising out of an estate, of which the husband was complete owner, and could bar her estate, I am of opinion, it is that sort of estate, which any equitable conveyance will bind. Any act of the husband for valuable consideration bars her equally with a legal surrender; and she is compellable in equity to surrender pursuant to such contract. A covenant by a joint-tenant to sell, though it does not sever the joint tenancy at law, will in equity. I have always understood this as a settled point, and have no difficulty upon it. Therefore let her convey all her estate and interest in the copyhold premises according to the deed of the 2nd of July 1792, subject to redemption.

== See also ==
- English trusts law
- English land law
- English property law
