= Oxley v Hiscock =

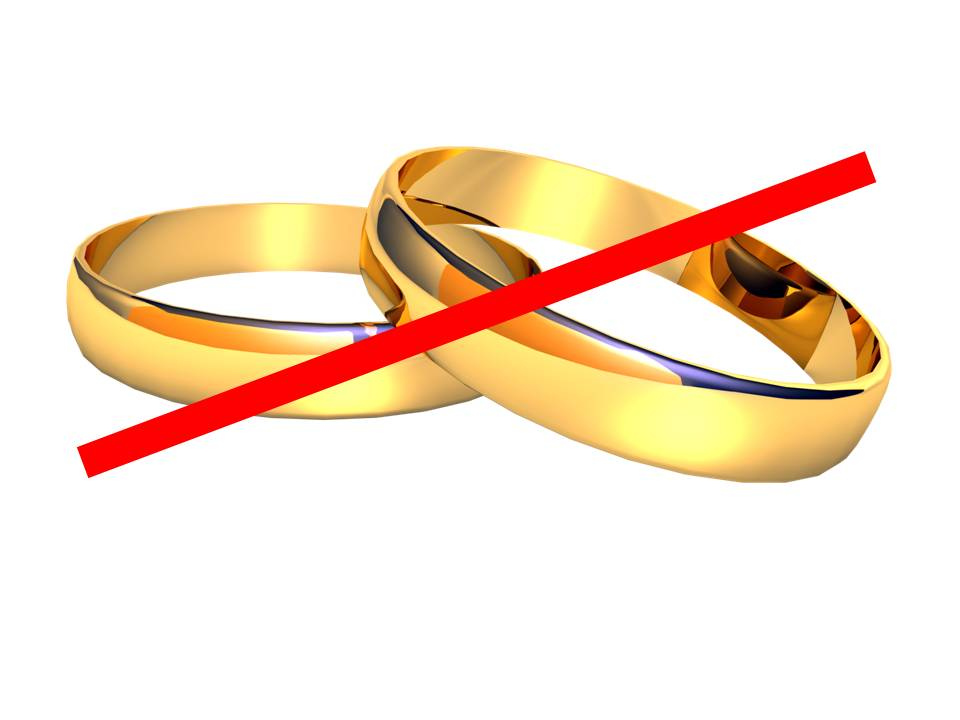
- Court: Court of Appeal
- Full case name: Elayne M T Oxley v Alan G Hiscock
- Decided: 6 May 2004
- Citations: [2004] EWCA Civ 546 [2005] Fam 211 [2004] Fam Law 569 [2004] 2 FLR 669 [2004] 20 EG 1 [2004] 2 FCR 295 [2004] 3 WLR 715 [2004] 3 All ER 703 [2004] WTLR 709 (2003-04) 6 ITELR 1091
- Transcript: BAILII

Case history
- Prior action: appellant lost as to a 50% share in the property at first instance.
- Subsequent action: none

Case opinions
- Chadwick LJ
- Decision by: Chadwick LJ
- Concurrence: Mance LJ; Scott Baker LJ

Keywords
- Cohabitants, family home, unequal contributions; joint tenancy; no deed of trust or co-ownership; legal constructions; constructive trust

Oxley v Hiscock [2004] EWCA 546 is a widely-reported English land law and family law case, concerning cohabitants' constructive trusts and their quantification in a home's equity value.

== Facts ==
Mrs Elayne Oxley had been living, renting in public housing in Page Close, Bean, near Dartford and under the Housing Act 1985 before leaving had lived there long enough to have the statutory right to buy. She quit the tenancy losing this valuable right, which on her own the court found she likely in a few years would have exercised. Instead she formed a new home with Mr Allan Hiscock, a First Iraq War soldier who had been captured in September 1987 at 35 Dickens Close. She paid 28%, he paid 48% of £25,200, a mortgage the balance. They both contributed to household expenditure, improvements, maintenance and paying off the mortgage. The parties fell out. Oxley claimed 50% of the proceeds. Hiscock claimed 22% to her would be appropriate taking into account also improvements he had made.

At trial in the Bromley County Court, HHJ Hallon held:

"The description given by the claimant, whose evidence I accept, shows that this was a classic pooling of resources, even though there was no joint bank account. . . . All of the evidence which I have heard clearly shows that both were evincing an intention to share the benefit and the burden of [35 Dickens Close] jointly and equally.

[...]

...from the analysis of the law and the facts in this case, it is clear that the order which the claimant sought in her notice of application is the only one that can properly be made, namely to declare that the claimant is equally entitled, with the defendant, to a half share in the proceeds of sale of the Hartley property ..."

== Judgment ==
Chadwick LJ held Oxley was entitled to a 40% share on the facts, not equal in light of the difference between their initial cash contributions. He said there were two questions (1) was there a constructive trust, and (2) how was it to be quantified. In particular, when there is no expression of what share each was (as in joint tenancy here) then it is up to the courts to decide.

69. It must now be accepted that (at least in this court and below) the answer is that each is entitled to that share which the court considers fair having regard to the whole course of dealing between them in relation to the property.’ Includes arrangements to meet outgoings like mortgage, council tax, utilities, repairs, insurance and housekeeping.

== See also ==
- English land law
- English property law
- Stack v Dowden [2007] UKHL 17
- Abbott v Abbott [2007] UKPC 53
- Geary v Rankine [2012] EWCA 555
