= Perfection (law) =

In law, perfection relates to the additional steps required to be taken in relation to a security interest in order to make it effective against third parties or to retain its effectiveness in the event of default by the grantor of the security interest. Generally speaking, once a security interest is effectively created, it gives certain rights to the holder of the security and imposes duties on the party who grants that security. However, in many legal systems, additional steps --- perfection of the security interest --- are required to enforce the security against third parties such as a liquidator.

== Concept ==
As a legal concept, perfection must be distinguished from:

- the grant or creation of the security interest, which creates its primary validity;
- attachment, which are steps that link the security interest to the underlying asset; and,
- priority, which is an ordering of competing security interests in same asset.

The same rule – the common law rule in Dearle v Hall, for instance – may govern both perfection against third parties (e.g., subsequent security holders) and prioritization of competing security interests.

In most legal systems, the need for perfection arises only in relation to security interests that are proprietary in nature (such as a mortgage or equitable charge). Other arrangements which constitute security in the loose sense of the word – for instance, title retention arrangements, hire purchase, and leasing transactions – need not in general be perfected in the legal sense.

In India, Section 125 of the Companies Act, 1956 provides that certain charges shall be void against liquidator or creditors unless registered. Thus, if a charge is not registered with Estado of Companies, and company happens to go for liquidation, even secured creditor shall be treated as unsecured.

== Types of perfection ==
There are three principal modes by which a security interest may be perfected (which method of perfection is applicable depends upon the nature of the security interest and the laws of the relevant country).

1. possession of the collateral;
2. statutory registration or filing; and/or
3. notice to the debtor or a fundholder.

=== Possession ===
Some security interests can be perfected only by the actual possession of the asset. For example, under a common-law pledge (or pawn), the right to enforce the sale of the asset is contingent upon the possession of that asset: an agreement that leaves the debtor in possession of the pledged collateral does not give rise to an enforceable security interest.

In certain cases, the possession does not need to be actual possession, but may be constructive possession. For example, possession of a document of title will often suffice where it is not possible to possess the goods. In many legal systems, there may also be constructive possession by attornment.

The law relating to perfection of security interests by taking of possession can sometimes be confused with the law relating to the granting of security interests, which provides that the deposit of certain assets (usually documents of title) can amount to an equitable mortgage of the goods.

=== Registration or filing ===
Certain security interests may be perfected by some kind of registration or filing. Although the terms are used interchangeably, it is more accurate to speak of registration as the lodgment of particulars, and filing as the lodgment of the security instrument itself.

Generally systems of registration divide into two types:

1. registration against a particular debtor; and
2. registration against a particular asset.

Each has its own advantages and disadvantages.

Registration against a particular asset only tends to be practical where the assets are of a nature and substance that makes it feasible to have a register for recording security interests against them. Most countries have systems for the registration of security relating to land, aircraft, ships and intellectual property rights. The advantage of a register relating to the asset is that if the debtor wishes to provide an asset as collateral, the proposed lender can swiftly check definitively whether the asset is encumbered or not. Issues arise when a secured creditor does not file with the correct office, leaving potential lenders without notice of encumbrances on potential collateral. One particular note regarding the perfection of security interests in a patent is an illustration of this issue of miscommunication. In order to perfect a security interest in a patent, it is not enough that you file a patent with the Patent and Trademark Office. A secured creditor, in order to perfect its interest, must file in the UCC Filing system. This is because the Patent act does not "preempt" the state requirements for filing. In other contexts, filing outside of the UCC filing system is appropriate to perfect a security interest. Specialist registers in some jurisdictions cannot always be considered "a one-stop source of information".

Registration against a debtor tends to operate by way of requiring the registration of certain security interests by the debtor. The advantage is that a lender can quickly see which assets of the debtor are encumbered and which are not. However, because many registration systems do not require all types of security interest to be registered gaps can remain. Also, systems which register security against the debtor do not act as a check that the debtor actually has title to any of the relevant assets, merely that he has not created any security interest over them.

However, the position is complicated by the fact that many legal systems employ both, interchangeably. A security interest granted by a debtor over a particular asset in any given country may need to be registered against the debtor, against the asset, both or neither.

=== Notice ===
In some legal systems, perfection of a security interest requires notice to be given to a relevant third party. This most commonly arises in relation to security over a debt or other chose in action, notice being required to be given to the party owing the debt or holding the fund. Under English law, an often cited example is the well-known rule in Dearle v Hall. Under the rule if A is owed money by X, and then A grants an equitable charge over that debt to B, and then grants a second equitable charge over the same debt to C, then the ability to enforce the charge by either B or C against the money in X's hands is dependent upon the giving of notice to X. The controversy in the rule relates to the fact that it is also a rule of priority, meaning that (if their rights are otherwise equal) the first one to give notice to X has the prior claim, irrespective of the order in which the equitable charges were granted.

Similarly, in many common law legal systems, where there is an assignment of a debt, the assignee cannot enforce the rights of the assigning creditor against the debtor unless notice of the assignment has been given, and until notice of the assignment has been given, the debtor can still discharge the debt by paying the money to the creditor, notwithstanding the assignment.

== See also ==
- Security interest: perfection
- Tacking (law)
