= Occupier with basic protection =

An occupier with basic protection is a term used in English property law that describes a type of licensee. The housing charity Shelter state that you are likely to be an occupier with basic protection is you live in the same building as your landlord but do not share living accommodation with them. Occupiers with basic protection have slightly greater security of tenure than excluded occupiers.
