= Manchester Airport plc v Dutton =

English land law case

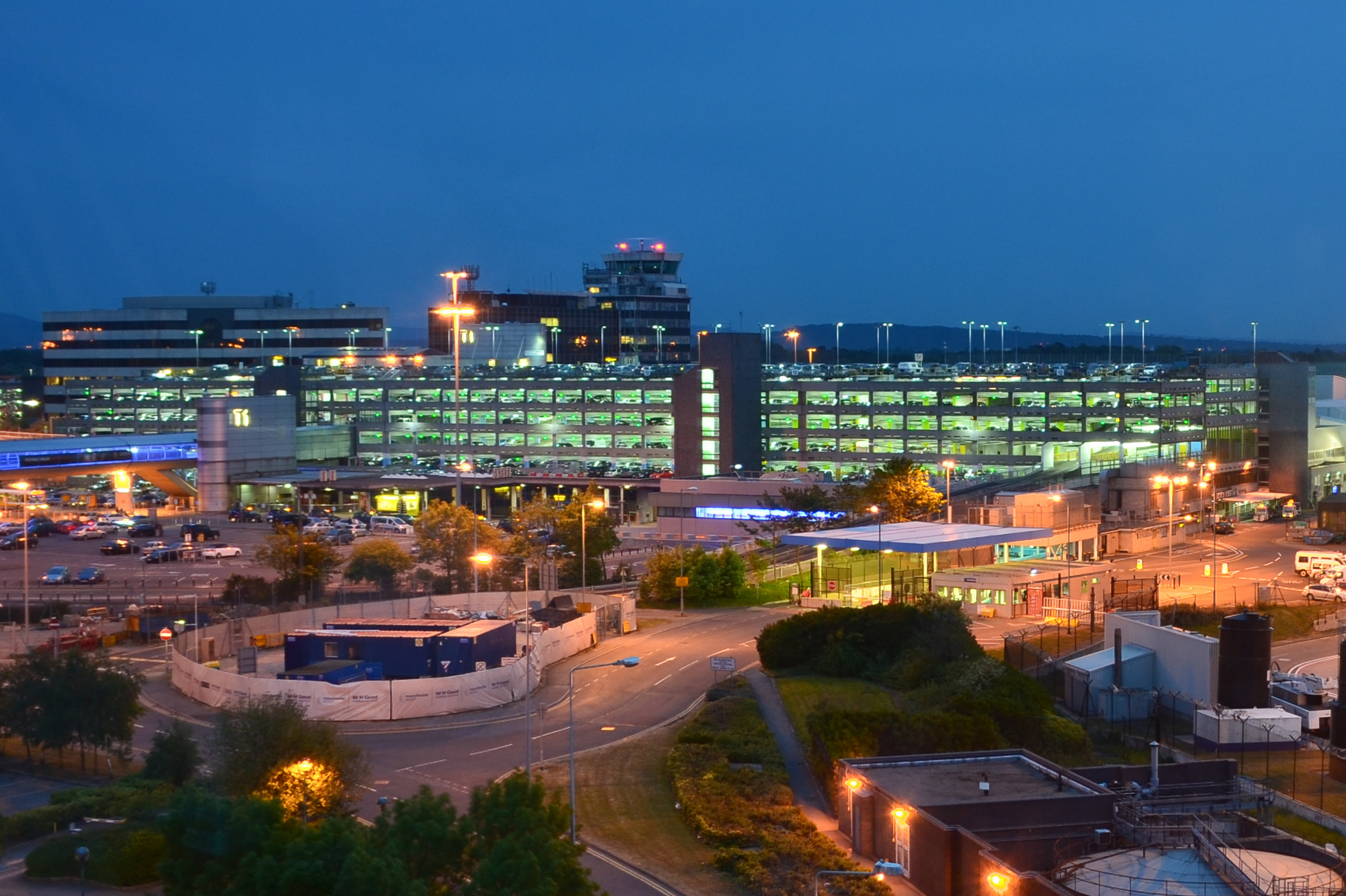
- Court: Court of Appeal
- Citations: [1999] EWCA Civ 844, [2000] QB 133

Court membership
- Judges sitting: Laws LJ; Kennedy LJ; Chadwick LJ

Case opinions
- Held, per Laws LJ: The court uses the contract to determine the control that arises from the contract. It then couples that with the right of occupation and then proceeds to grant relief as would vindicate licensee's rights of occupation arising out of the contract.
- Concurrence: Kennedy LJ
- Dissent: Chadwick LJ

Keywords
- Licence; right of licensee to occupy; building works; Trust technically prohibited from alienating title; environmental protesters

Manchester Airport plc v Dutton [1999] EWCA 844 is an English land law case, concerning licences in land. It confirmed the court will attach to licences, even where narrowly drawn to avoid giving away title, a right to occupy provided it meets with the clear commercial purposes of the contract. This means those third parties, in this case protestors, who interfered with such rights must be removed.

== Facts ==
A second runway was being built and trees had to go on National Trust land. The National Trust gave Manchester Airport plc authority to let subcontractors enter. Mr Dutton and environmental protestors tried to stop the work in protest, and occupied the land. Manchester Airport plc had not put any people on site yet, but still claimed an injunction under Order 113 of the Rules of the Supreme Court for their removal.

== Judgment ==
Laws LJ held that although the licensee could remove the protestors, ejectment (court bailiffs to assist) under settled law could only be claimed by someone with title or an estate in land. Also, the licensee (the Airport) was not in occupation, and did not have title, so the court could not grant any of the other possessory remedies (in trespass and nuisance).

But given that the licensee had brought a claim in possession, the court would first consider the extent of licensee's actual or right to occupation arising out of any term of the licence contract. Then the court would consider any element of control arising out of the licence contract. Then the court would give such remedies as would vindicate the licensee's rights under the licence contract.

But the licensee must first bring its claim under CPR 55 (then Ord 113) possession proceedings. That is the first step. The court does not then give possession back to the licensee (as licensee had no possession that was disturbed in the first place). The licensee was never entitled to possession only mere occupation. Indeed, the licensee could never obtain possession as National Trust was prohibited from alienating any of its land in possession.

The court gave relief as would vindicate the construction contract. Such relief in this case included an injunction to remove the trespassers from the trees, possibly a (costs) award for the actual removal and other (mainly their legal advocates') costs (to be determined later) and an injunction that would prevent the protesters return.

Relief is given not to put licensee in possession but to vindicate (uphold) such rights of occupation as are given by the contract. The court uses the contract to determine the control that arises from the contract. It then couples that with the right of occupation and then proceeds to grant relief as would vindicate licensee's rights of occupation arising out of the contract.

Kennedy LJ concurred.

Chadwick LJ dissented. ‘In the latter case (which is this case) the plaintiff must succeed by the strength of his title, not on the weakness (or lack) of any title in the defendant.’

== See also ==
- English trusts law
- English land law
- English property law
