= Eves v Eves =

- Court: Court of Appeal
- Full case name: Janet Eves v Stuart Eves
- Decided: 28 April 1975
- Citations: [1975] EWCA Civ 3 [1975] 1 WLR 1338

Case history
- Prior action: Appellant lost in the High Court on 10 April 1974 before the Vice Chancellor

Court membership
- Judges sitting: Lord Denning, Master of the Rolls; Browne LJ; Brightman J

Keywords
- constructive trust, family home, equity, cohabitation

Eves v Eves [1975] EWCA Civ 3 is an English land law case, concerning constructive trusts of the family home.

== Facts ==
Mr Eves bought a home and kept the legal title in his name using the proceeds of his old home and a mortgage loan. His cohabiting girlfriend for what would prove 4 1/2 years, Janet Eves, lived there and asked why she had not been made an owner. He said it was because she was not yet 21. They had not married as Mr Eves was already married but were estranged. Janet nonetheless took his surname by deed poll in late 1968 having moved into his earlier matrimonial house. Janet gave birth to their first child in April 1969. "The house was very dirty and dilapidated. They went in and made their home there. She did a great deal of work to the house and garden. She did much more than many wives would do. She stripped the wallpaper in the hall. She painted woodwork in the lounge and kitchen. She painted the kitchen cabinets. She painted the brickwork in the front of the house. She broke up the concrete [with a 14 lb sledgehammer] in the front garden. She carried the pieces to a skip. She, with him, demolished a shed and put up a new shed. She prepared the front garden for turfing. To add to it all, they had their second child, a girl, on 29th December 1970."

On 19 January 1973, Janet got an order from the magistrates giving her custody of the two children and ordering Stuart Eves to pay £5 a week maintenance for each. He did not keep up those payments.

The case came before the High Court in April 1974, before the Vice Chancellor. He accepted the evidence of Janet in preference to that of Stuart Eves, but held that she was not entitled to any share in the house. She appealed.

== Judgment ==
Lord Denning MR held Mr Eves held the house on constructive trust and Janet had a 25% share. Doing the improvement work manifested a common intention to share in the home's equity.

The other appeal judges concurred but with differing reasoning:

Browne LJ:

The Vice Chancellor accepted in his judgment that there had been some sort of arrangement between Janet and Stuart Eves that the house should be put in their joint names, but that Stuart Eves had tricked Janet Eves out of this by saying that the house could not be taken in her name because she was under 21. In fact, she was over 21 by the time the conveyance was executed. The Vice Chancellor said:

If this discussion and this arrangement had been in any way linked in the evidence to Mrs. Eves' activities after the purchase, the arrangement would, I think, afford considerable support for an inference of common ownership based on the contribution represented by these activities.

The Vice Chancellor, however, came to the conclusion that he was not able to find any such link. For reasons which will be more fully stated by Mr. Justice Brightman, I am prepared to draw the inference that there was such a link; and accordingly that the result is that Janet Eves is entitled to a share in the beneficial interest in this house. I agree with my Lord that the right figure in this case is one quarter. Accordingly, I agree, as I have said, that the appeal should be allowed and the order made in the form proposed by my Lord.

Brightman J:

The respondent sold the house at Romford. 39, Broadhurst Avenue was bought at the price of £5,600. £2,400 came from the net proceeds of sale of the Romford house, and the balance of £3,200 was raised on mortgage. The conveyance was taken in the name of the respondent alone and the mortgage deed was executed by him alone.

It is clear from the evidence, and was so found by the Vice Chancellor, that at the time of the purchase the respondent told the appellant that if she had been 21 years of age, he would have put the house into their joint names, because it was to be their joint home. He agrees that he used her age as an excuse to avoid this course. He was asked in cross- examination:

"Why did you make that comment to her about the house being in joint names but for the fact that she was under 21?" He replied:

"I suppose at the time it was an excuse that I did not have to put it in joint names."

It seems to me that this answer raises a clear inference that there was an understanding between them that she was intended to have some sort of proprietary interest in the house: otherwise no excuse would have been needed.

After the purchase, the appellant and respondent set about putting the house and garden in order. The Vice Chancellor accepted the following description of the work done by the appellant, most of which he found was carried out soon after the move...

A second daughter was born in December 1970. Unfortunately relations deteriorated, and in November 1972 the respondent left. He remarried in 1972. He and his wife now live in the house. The appellant was given custody of the two children, and an order has been made requiring the respondent to contribute to their maintenance. The appellant and her children now have a home elsewhere...

Gissing v Gissing [1971] is the principal authority which has been read to us to indicate the correct approach to this type of case...

The present case is different. The respondent clearly led the appellant to believe that she was to have some undefined interest in the property, and that her name was only omitted from the conveyance because of her age. This, of course, is not enough by itself to create a beneficial interest in her favour; there would at best be a mere "voluntary declaration of trust" which would be "unenforceable for want of writing": per Lord Diplock...

If, however, it was part of the bargain between the parties, expressed or to be implied, that the appellant should contribute her labour towards the reparation of a house in which she was to have some beneficial interest, then I think that the arrangement becomes one to which the law can give effect. This seems to be consistent with the reasoning...

Applying the law in a difficult field as best I can, I reach the conclusion, without great confidence, that the court should imply that the appellant was intended to acquire a quarter interest in the house. On this basis, the house is held by the respondent in trust as to three quarters for himself and as to one quarter for the appellant.

At the same time, I consider that so long as the respondent keeps down the mortgage payments, he should not be liable to the appellant for an occupation rent. Also, so long as he makes good the arrears of maintenance in respect of his children by the appellant within a reasonable time, and continues to pay the instalments due in the future, a sale ought not to be ordered at the instance of the appellant in order to realise her interest in the property. When the children are past the age at which maintenance payments are due, the court may have to consider whether it would be right to direct a sale at the instance of the appellant. But, of course, the respondent may be content to pay her out by agreement. Also when no mortgage payments are any longer due, it may be necessary for the court to consider the question of an occupation rent. However, these are future questions and it is to be hoped that they will be satisfactorily resolved by agreement between the parties before they actually arise.

== Considered in ==
R v Robson (Stephen) (1990) 92 Cr App R 1; The Times, 7 August 1990, CA (E&W)

== Applied in ==
Grant v Edwards [1986] Ch 638, CA (E&W)

== See also ==
- English land law
- English property law
