= Excluded occupier =

An excluded occupier is a term in English property law used to describe someone with limited rights to remain in a home. If you share your accommodation with your landlord you are likely to be an excluded occupier. An excluded occupier is only entitled to 'reasonable notice' before being asked to leave a property so does not have to be evicted using section 21 notice like if they were an assured shorthold tenant.

== See also ==
- Occupier with basic protection
