= Gissing v Gissing =

UK legal case

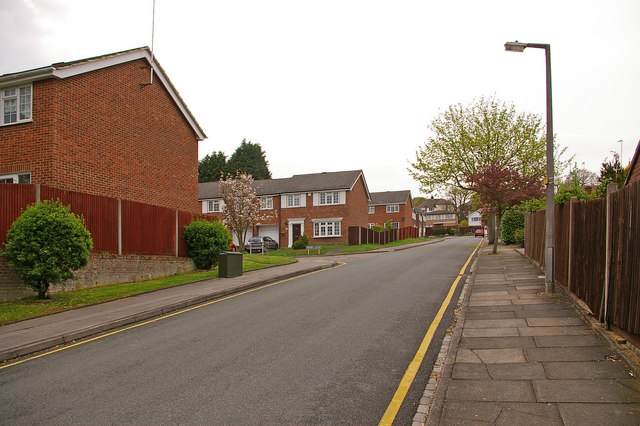
- Court: House of Lords
- Citations: [1970] UKHL 3, [1971] AC 886

Keywords
- Constructive trusts, common intention, family home

Gissing v Gissing [1970] UKHL 3 is an English land law and trust law case dealing with constructive trusts arising in relationships between married couple. It may no longer represent good law, since the decisions of Stack v Dowden and Jones v Kernott.

== Facts ==
Mr and Mrs Gissing were married in 1935, their early 20s. They had a son in 1939 while living in a flat in Tulse Hill. She worked as a printer (where she stayed as a secretary till 1957). He got a job with the same firm after the war, and they bought 28 Tubbenden Drive as a matrimonial home in 1951 for £2,695, £2,150 from a mortgage in Mr Gissing’s name, and conveyed into Mr Gissing’s sole name. Mrs Gissing spent £220 of her own money on buying furniture and the laying of the lawn. Mr Gissing always paid the mortgage instalments, but left to live with another woman in 1961. She claimed he told her then the house was hers. She succeeded in 1966 in getting a divorce on grounds of his adultery, with a maintenance order but later reduced to 1s a year, and she brought an action that she would be entitled to an equitable interest in the home.

== Judgment ==
=== Court of Appeal ===
The majority of the Court of Appeal held that Mrs Gissing was entitled to an equitable interest in the home. Lord Denning MR held that Mrs Gissing was entitled to a half equitable interest in the property, because the home was acquired as a joint venture, even though she contributed no money directly to buying the property. He said the following.

It comes to this: where a couple, by their joint efforts, get a house and furniture, intending it to be a continuing provision for them for their joint lives, it is a prima facie inference from their conduct that the house and furniture is a "family asset" in which each is entitled to an equal share. It matters not in whose name it stands: or who pays for what: or who goes out to work and who stays at home. If they both contribute to it by their joint efforts, the prima facie inference is that it belongs to them both equally: at any rate, when each makes a financial contribution which is substantial.

[...]

The Divorce Division has ample power to do what is fair and reasonable, having regard to the conduct of the parties: whereas, the Chancery Division is asked only to answer the cold legal question: what interest has the wife in the house? without regard to the conduct of the parties.

Phillimore LJ concurred.

Edmund Davies LJ dissented, denouncing the ‘palm tree justice’ of the majority.

=== House of Lords ===
The House of Lords held that Mrs Gissing had made no contribution to the house from which a beneficial interest could be inferred. No inference for a common intention to share in the home's equity could be inferred.

Lord Reid said the following.

I can see no good reason for this distinction and I think that in many cases it would be unworkable. Suppose the spouses have a joint bank account. In accordance with their arrangement she pays in enough money to meet the household bills and so there is enough to pay the purchase price instalments and their bills as well as their personal expenses. They never discuss whose money is to go to pay for the house and whose is to go to pay for other things. How can anyone tell whether she has made a direct or only an indirect contribution to paying for the house?

Lord Diplock said the following.

A resulting, implied or constructive trust - and it is unnecessary for present purposes to distinguish between these three classes of trust - is created by a transaction between the trustee and the cestui que trust in connection with the acquisition by the trustee of a legal estate in land, whenever the trustee has so conducted himself that it would be inequitable to allow him to deny to the cestui que trust a beneficial interest in the land acquired. and he will be held so to have conducted himself if by his words or conduct he has induced the cestui que trust to act to his own detriment in the reasonable belief that by so acting he was acquiring a beneficial interest in the land.

[...]

For such conduct is no less consistent with a common intention to share the day-to-day expenses of the household, while each spouse retains a separate interest in capital assets acquired with their own moneys or obtained by inheritance or gift. There is nothing here to rebut the prima facie inference that a purchaser of land who pays the purchase price and takes a conveyance and grants a mortgage in his own name intends to acquire the sole beneficial interest as well as the legal estate…
