= Hurst v Picture Theatres Ltd =

1915 English land law case

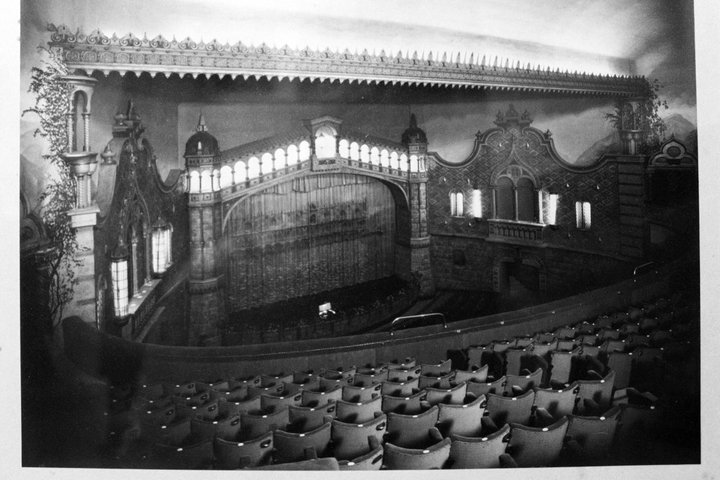
- Court: Court of Appeal
- Decided: 8 July 1914
- Citation: [1915] 1 KB 1

Case history
- Prior action: Appellant lost also at first instance in the High Court.

Keywords
- Licence; ticketed attendance; removal of people from events (revocation); mistake; law of trespass

Hurst v Picture Theatres Ltd [1915] 1 KB 1 is an English land law case, concerning licences "in" land, specifically ticketed events. The appeal court confirmed that there is no right, based on e.g. land owner's discretion as to determining trespassers, to remove the attendee if the venue operator is mistaken as to the attendee's right to attend.

== Facts ==
Mr Hurst bought a ticket for 17 March 1913's screening of Lake Garda in a London cinema of Picture Theatres Ltd. The manager honestly believed he had not paid for his seat. He was forced to leave, and then he claimed trespass to the person. The theatre argued that even though it revoked (breached) the licence, a contract relating to a person's right to be somewhere, its mistaken belief could render Hurst a trespasser (if so reasonable force could be used to remove him).

The issue was whether the claimant was entitled to damages under trespass to the person.

Channell J held, with a jury, Hurst could get damages.

== Judgment ==
Buckley LJ confirmed the award.

They committed an assault upon him in law. It was not of a violent kind, because, like a wise man, [Hurst] gave way to superior force and left the theatre... it was for the jury to give him such a sum as was right for the assault which was committed upon him, and for the serious indignity to a gentleman of being seized and treated in this way in a place of public resort.

== See also ==
- English property law
- English tort law
