= Lloyds Bank plc v Rosset =

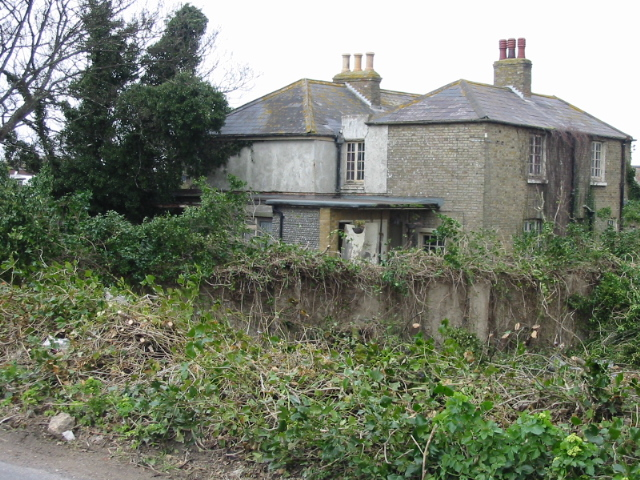
- The derelict Vincent Farmhouse
- Court: House of Lords
- Full case name: Lloyds Bank plc v Rosset and another (v Mr Rosset and Mrs Rosset)
- Decided: 29 March 1990
- Citations: [1990] UKHL 14 [1991] 1 AC 107 [1990] 2 WLR 867 [1990] 1 All ER 1111

Case history
- Prior actions: High Court before HHJ Scarlett: Bank succeeded in showing Rosset not in actual occupation on date of charge Court of Appeal overturned this. Both courts saw as fit to see an equitable contribution leading to an "implied common intention" interest of Mrs Rosset.
- Subsequent action: none

Court membership
- Judges sitting: Lord Bridge of Harwich; Lord Griffiths; Lord Ackner; Lord Oliver of Aylmerton; Lord Jauncey of Tullichettle

Case opinions
- Decision by: Lord Bridge
- Concurrence: Lord Griffiths; Lord Ackner; Lord Oliver of Aylmerton; Lord Jauncey of Tullichettle

Keywords
- Constructive trust in equity; actual occupation as overriding interest under the land registration acts; no direct financial contribution; sole legal ownership; no co-ownership promises or agreement; contribution by renovation works

Lloyds Bank plc v Rosset [1990] UKHL 14 is an English land law, trusts law and matrimonial law case. It specifically deals with the translation into money of physical contributions from a cohabitee or spouse (as regards each other), under which its principles have been largely superseded.

The case stood for the proposition that a no-owning cohabitee contributing to the cost of running a house and, even, quite common renovations to a derelict property did not, in itself, create a beneficial interest in that person's favour. All of the reasoning of the judgment was delivered by Lord Bridge, receiving four concurrences from the other judges who had read his judgment in advance. Its strict limits on equity flowing to a non-owning partner were doubted in Stack v Dowden, in which the final court of appeal sitting in 2007 said "the law has moved on".

In the lower court it dealt with a follow-on aspect of finding — instead — a valid contribution: the question of whether, in a repossession scenario the pre-purchase home improver who is not the borrower nor the legal owner (in this case it was the spouse/partner of the borrower) is in "actual occupation". If so that would override and outrank the lender's interests in the property. That court's panel found (2-1) that Rosset's renovation works during the school day, including on the date of making of the mortgage/secured overdraft, did amount to actual occupation.

== Facts ==
Mr and Mrs Rosset had bought a semi-derelict house called Vincent Farmhouse on Manston Road, in Thanet, Kent, with Mr Rosset’s family trust money. The trustees had insisted on his sole ownership as a condition for taking the trust money. He had funded the cost of the renovations to the house. She had made no financial contributions to the acquisition or renovations, but had done decorating and helped by assisting in the professional building works in the immediate two months before their full-time moving in (including at night). Mrs Rosset was in possession of the home on 7 November 1982, but contracts were not exchanged until 23 November. Mr Rosset took out a loan from Lloyds Bank and secured it with a mortgage on the home. The charge was executed on 14 December, without Mrs Rosset’s knowledge, and completion took place on 17 December. The charge was registered on 7 February 1983. Then Mr Rosset defaulted on the loan. Lloyds Bank sought possession of the home in the late 1980s as the loan fell into arrears.

Mrs Rosset argued that she had a right to stay because she had not consented to the mortgage, and she had an overriding interest in the property. Under the Land Registration Act 1925 section 70(1)(g) (now Land Registration Act 2002 Schedule 3, paragraph 2) the bank's interest, therefore, ranked behind hers.

The bank contended she had no property rights in the home, amongst other things, because the work she had done was not enough to give her an equitable proprietary right. Secondly, as found in the lower courts, she was not "in actual occupation" at the relevant date.

== Judgment ==
=== Court of Appeal ===
The Court of Appeal, by 2—1, held that Mrs Rosset was in actual occupation of her home. Nicholls LJ held that it had been a common intention, on the facts, that she would share in the property. She had done acts to her detriment, and she was in actual occupation at the relevant date through the builders, agreeing with the court below. The term ‘actual occupation’ does not require physical presence, and daily visits of Mrs Rosset to the semi-derelict house was enough. He also suggested builders for Mrs Rosset were also occupying on her behalf.

Purchas LJ agreed. He clarified in his view the meaning of actual occupation should reflect equitable rules, and so undiscoverable people’s interests would not bind. Further in his view, Mrs Rosset's occupation was "discoverable".

Mustill LJ dissented, finding Rossett not, in his view in actual occupation.

=== House of Lords ===
The court decided Mrs Rosset had no beneficial interest in the property. There were no discussions to that effect, and the work Mrs Rosset did was not enough for a constructive trust.

The court also held, obiter, the date to determine whether Mrs Rosset was in occupation under LRA 1925 section 70 was the date the charge was created, i.e. 17 December just as Scarlett J had interpreted the law at trial; however, it abjectly refused to be drawn into whether Rosset was "in actual occupation" (clarifying this would need to be before completion). In this court's view, finding unlike the courts below, no equitable interest of Rosset, it would be unnecessary to look at her actual occupation as she, in reality, had no strict economic right to be there so as to outrank the lender.

Lord Bridge gave the only legal opinion, holding that because there had never been any express agreement that she would have a share, nor any contributions to the purchase price, Mrs Rosset could establish no right in the home. The other judges said they had pre-read this judgment and they approved it. He said:

The first and fundamental question which must always be resolved is whether, independently of any inference to be drawn from the conduct of the parties in the course of sharing the house as their home and managing their joint affairs, there has at any time prior to acquisition, or exceptionally at some later date, been any agreement, arrangement or understanding reached between them that the property is to be shared beneficially. The finding of an agreement or arrangement to share in this sense can only, I think, be based on evidence of express discussions between the partners, however imperfectly remembered and however imprecise their terms may have been. Once a finding to this effect is made it will only be necessary for the partner asserting a claim to a beneficial interest against the partner entitled to the legal estate to show that he or she has acted to his or her detriment or significantly altered his or her position in reliance on the agreement in order to give rise to a constructive trust or a proprietary estoppel.

In sharp contrast with this situation is the very different one where there is no evidence to support a finding of an agreement or arrangement to share, however reasonable it might have been for the parties to reach such an arrangement if they had applied their minds to the question, and where the court must rely entirely on the conduct of the parties both as the basis from which to infer a common intention to share the property beneficially and as the conduct relied on to give rise to a constructive trust. In this situation direct contributions to the purchase price by the partner who is not the legal owner, whether initially or by payment of mortgage instalments, will readily justify the inference necessary to the creation of a constructive trust. But, as I read the authorities, it is at least extremely doubtful whether anything less will do.

[...]

Outstanding examples on the other hand of cases giving rise to situations in the first category are Eves v Eves [1975] 1 WLR 1338 and Grant v Edwards [1986] Ch 638. In both these cases, where the parties who had cohabited were unmarried, the female partner had been clearly led by the male partner to believe, when they set up home together, that the property would belong to them jointly. In Eves the male partner had told the female partner that the only reason why the property was to be acquired in his name alone was because she was under 21 and that, but for her age, he would have had the house put into their joint names. He admitted in evidence that this was simply an "excuse." Similarly in Grant v Edwards the female partner was told by the male partner that the only reason for not acquiring the property in joint names was because she was involved in divorce proceedings and that, if the property were acquired jointly, this might operate to her prejudice in those proceedings.

[...]

If Mrs. Rosset had become entitled to a beneficial interest in the property prior to completion it might have been necessary to examine a variant of the question regarding priorities which your Lordships have just considered in Abbey National Building Society v Cann and, subject to that question, to decide whether, as a matter of fact, she was in "actual occupation" of the property on 17 December 1982. Since these questions have now become academic, I do not think any useful purpose would be served by going into them.

Lord Griffiths, Lord Ackner, Lord Oliver and Lord Jauncey concurred.

== Significance ==
Lloyds Bank plc v Rosset was subjected to heavy criticism for failing to recognise that work might generate an equitable interest in a family home. It was said in Stack v Dowden by Lord Walker that:

Whether or not Lord Bridge's observation was justified in 1990, in my opinion the law has moved on, and your Lordships should move it a little more in the same direction, while bearing in mind that the Law Commission may soon come forward with proposals which, if enacted by Parliament, may recast the law in this area.

However, Stack can be distinguished from Rosset as it was a case involving two legal owners and not a single legal owner and a person claiming a beneficial interest. In that regard Lord Walker's criticism was forceful obiter dicta and did not repeal Rosset. Lloyds Bank plc v Rosset, which as House of Lords authority, must be repealed by a later cases of equal authority (i.e. now in the Supreme Court), must, according the doctrine of stare decisis, still be seen as the leading case on constructive trust claims regarding single legal owner properties.

== See also ==
- English trusts law
- Stack v Dowden
- Common intention (Property law)
