= Geary v Rankine =

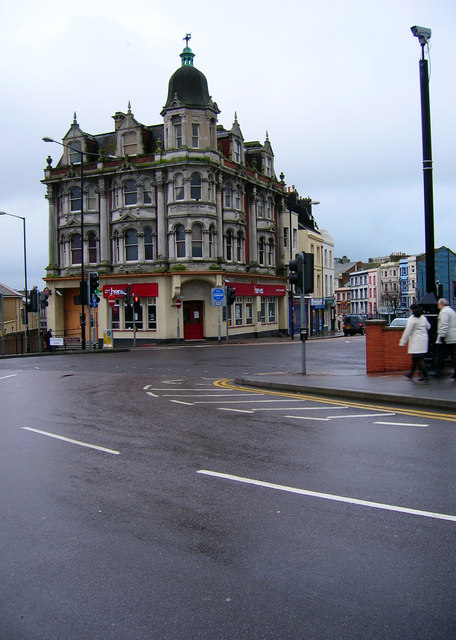
- The corner of Devonshire Road, Hastings. The guest house was at number 7, Castle View
- Court: Court of Appeal
- Decided: 29 March 2012
- Citation: [2012] EWCA Civ 555

Case history
- Prior action: Failed appeal at the High Court

Court membership
- Judges sitting: Lewison LJ, Etherton LJ, Thorpe LJ

Keywords
- trust, family home

Geary v Rankine [2012] EWCA Civ 555 is an English land law case, concerning constructive trusts, and the establishment of a beneficial interest in an enterprise between a business owner and his or her lover and co-worker. It specifically concerned a case where the latter person received no formal wages and had entered no formal ownership nor partnership agreement nor directly or indirectly contributed in money to the purchase price.

== Facts ==
Mrs Geary and Mr Rankine had been in a relationship since 1990. In 1996, Rankine purchased a guest house with his own savings. The parties had not intended to live in the property or run it themselves; instead having it run by a manager. Difficulties with the manager led Rankine to run the business himself. He realised that he could not run it alone. Geary became involved in the business: cleaning, cooking and looking after guests. Rankine did not pay Geary wages, and she asked for money when she needed it. The relationship deteriorated. Geary brought a claim for an interest in the guest house. She claimed she either had a business Partnership (as defined under the Partnership Act 1890) or a constructive trust as defined by case law.

== Judgment ==
At first instance, the Judge rejected Geary's claim. She appealed.

The Court of Appeal dismissed the appeal, holding that the legal title was solely in Rankine's name and so the burden of establishing a constructive trust was on Geary. The relevant question was whether there was a common intention for Geary to have a beneficial interest in the property, applying Jones v Kernott [2011] UKSC 53, which must be determined objectively from the parties' conduct. Geary had shown there was a common intention to run the business together, but it was not correct to therefore reach a conclusion of a common intention that the property in which the business was run, bought by only one of them, would if so belong to both of them. The judge at first instance had not erred in probing the evidence and concluding there was no constructive trust.

Lewison LJ's summative paragraph reads:

22. What Mrs Geary was saying was that the common intention was that she and Mr Rankine would run the business together, but in my judgment it is an impermissible leap to go from a common intention that the parties would run a business together to a conclusion that it was their common intention that the property in which the business was run, and which was bought entirely with money provided by one of them, would belong to both of them. In addition, Mrs Geary's own evidence makes it clear to my mind that Mr Rankine had no intention that she should have an interest in the property itself. First, as I have said, her evidence was, as was his, that he would refuse to recognise her unless she got divorced. She did not get divorced until 2002, some six years after the acquisition. That refusal to recognise her is in my judgment inconsistent with an intention on his part that she should have a beneficial interest in the property. I might add that his given reason, namely that he feared that her husband might make a claim on the property, is a perfectly rational reason even if it might not have been given effect. Second, Mrs Geary's evidence was that as the years went by she asked what security she had for her and her son and that Mr Rankine either said the business should remain in his sole name or was non-committal. Those passages are also, in my judgment, inconsistent with an intention on Mr Rankine's part that Mrs Geary should have a beneficial interest in the freehold of Castle View.

== See also ==
- Jones v Kernott [2011] UKSC 53
- Oxley v Hiscock [2004] EWCA Civ 546
- Stack v Dowden [2007] UKHL 17
