= John Chadwick (judge) =

English Lord Justice of Appeal

The Right Honourable Sir John Chadwick ED
- Royal coat of arms of the United Kingdom

Lord Justice of Appeal
- In office 1997–2007

Personal details
- Born: John Murray Chadwick; 20 January 1941 (age 85) Cheltenham, Gloucestershire, England
- Spouse: Diana Mary Blunt (m. 1975)
- Occupation: Judge
- Profession: Barrister

Sir John Murray Chadwick, ED, PC (born 20 January 1941) is a retired English Lord Justice of Appeal. He also served as the President of the Court of Appeal of the Cayman Islands, and as a judge of the Dubai International Financial Centre court. Sir John was also standing Counsel to the DTI, and sat as a Judge of the Courts of Appeal of Jersey and Guernsey. He also works as an arbitrator.

== Biography ==
He was born in Cheltenham to Hector George Chadwick and Margaret Corry Laing. He was educated at Rugby School and Magdalene College, Cambridge. He was called to the bar aged 25 in 1966 as a member of the Inner Temple; he became a Queen's Counsel in 1980.

He was appointed as a High Court judge in 1991 and received the customary knighthood. He then sat in the Chancery Division for 6 years. He was promoted to the Court of Appeal in 1997, where he was appointed to the Privy Council. He retired from the English Court of Appeal in November 2007.

== Notable decisions ==
Notable decisions of Lord Justice Chadwick included:

- Wilson v Secretary of State for Trade and Industry [2001] EWCA 633 (reversed on appeal by the Supreme Court)
- Morphitis v Bernasconi [2003] EWCA 289
- Penrose and Another v The Official Receiver (1995)
- Midland Bank plc v Cooke [1995] 4 All ER 562
- Oxley v Hiscock [2004] EWCA 546
- Manchester Airport plc v Dutton [1999] EWCA 844 (dissenting)
- Ropaigealach v Barclays Bank plc [1998] EWCA 1960
- Kent v Kavanagh [2006] EWCA 162
- Governing Body of Clifton Middle School v Askew [1999] EWCA 1892 (dissenting)

== Equitable Life ==
In 2009, Sir John Chadwick was also appointed to lead an inquiry into the failure of The Equitable Life Assurance Society, and to recommend compensation for the victims. This led ultimately to the passing of the Equitable Life (Payments) Act 2010.

== Controversy ==
Sir John was appointed as chair of a public inquiry in relation to allegations of feeding fox cubs to hounds. It later emerged that he had been filmed whilst he was involved in a hunt which clashed with protesters, and it was alleged that he was filmed using his horsewhip in the direction of protesters.
