= Dyer v Dyer =

1788 English trusts law case

- Court: Exchequer Court
- Decided: 27 November 1788
- Citation: 2 Cox Eq Cas 92, [1775-1802] All ER Rep 205, (1788) 2 RR 14, 30 ER 42, [1788] EWHC Exch J8

Court membership
- Judges sitting: L. C. Baron, B. Hotham, B. Thompson

Dyer v Dyer [1788] EWHC Exch J8, (1788) 2 Cox Eq Cas 92 is an English trusts law case which held that where property is purchased by one person in the name of another there is the presumption of a resulting trust.

== Facts ==
A person provided money to purchase a legal estate in land in the name of another person, and there was no evidence that the purchaser intended to advance a loan or make a gift. It was therefore assumed that the legal title holder holds the property on resulting trust for the person who provided the funds.

== Judgment ==
Eyre CB stated "the trust of a legal estate, whether freehold, copyhold, or leasehold; whether taken in the names of the purchasers and other jointly, or in the names of others without that of the purchaser; whether in the one name or several; whether jointly or successive - results to the man who advances the purchase-money".

== See also ==
- English property law
