= Morphitis v Bernasconi =

UK insolvency and company law case

- Court: Court of Appeal
- Citations: [2003] EWCA Civ 289, [2003] 2 WLR 1521

Keywords
- Fraudulent trading

Morphitis v Bernasconi [2003] EWCA Civ 289 is a UK insolvency law and company law case, concerning fraudulent trading.

== Facts ==
TMC Transport (UK) Ltd's former directors were Mr Bernasconi and Mr Monti. Mr Morphitis was the liquidator. They hired a group of solicitors who advised that the Insolvency Act 1986 rules on trading while insolvent could be circumvented by setting up a new company, resigning, and transferring the assets but not the liabilities there. The case turned on whether knowingly failing to pay a final instalment to their landlord was enough to constitute fraudulent trading under the Insolvency Act 1986, section 213.

== Judgment ==
Chadwick LJ held that there was not enough to constitute fraud in this case on this single instance. Not every fraudulent transaction makes the business a business carried on with intent to defraud. Moreover, there must be a causal connection between the fraud and the loss, or ‘some nexus between (i) the loss which has been caused to the company’s creditors generally by the carrying on of the business in the manner which gives rise to the exercise of the power and (ii) the contribution which those knowingly party to the carrying on of the business in that manner should be ordered to make to the assets in which the company’s creditors will share in the liquidation.’ Then, obiter he said it could not have been the intention of Parliament to allow more than compensatory claims under section 213. Disapproving the order of the judge below, he said that the provision for criminal charges in Companies Act 1985, section 458 (now Companies Act 2006, s 993) precluded any necessity for a punitive element.

== See also ==
- UK insolvency law
- UK company law
