= Ropaigealach v Barclays Bank plc =

- Court: Court of Appeal
- Decided: 18 December 1998
- Citations: [1998] EWCA Civ 1960 [1999] 4 All ER 235 [2000] QB 263 [1999] 3 WLR 17 [1998] EG 189 (2000) 32 HLR 234,
- Transcript: EWCA Civ 1960

Case history
- Prior action: Appellant also failed on earlier appeal in the Cardiff District Registry of the High Court before Longmore J.
- Subsequent action: none

Case opinions
- Held: "if it were possible to construe section 36 by affording mortgagors protection whether or not the mortgagee chose to obtain possession by self-help or legal action, I for my part would do so. I have however been persuaded that it is not possible."
- Decision by: Chadwick LJ
- Concurrence: Henry LJ; Clarke LJ

Keywords
- Mortgage; arrears; sections 8 & 36 Administration of Justice Act 1970; court discretion; mortgage excluding section 103 of the Law of Property Act 1925 (and entitling rapid sale after unsettled demand if property could be entered); self-help of lender

Ropaigealach v Barclays Bank plc [2000] QB 263 is an English land law case, concerning mortgage arrears and a rare mortgage over a family home which had a right to enter a home (temporarily vacant) and sell it without a court order.

== Facts ==
On 8 October 1996, the bank informed Mr Ropaigealach by letter that it was taking steps to realise its security. A letter in the same terms was sent to Mrs Ropaigealach at a different address. The bank wrote again, on 7 November to Mr and Mrs Ropaigealach at their home, the security, 16 Windsor Esplanade. Before the end of the year the bank sold it at auction.

The Ropaigealachs did not receive the last letter from Barclays (with final demand for payment, as earlier, warning the property would be sold but more imminently) because they were having it renovated and were away. They heard of the impending nature of the sale through a neighbour.

== Judgment ==
Chadwick LJ gave the leading judgment, he said that it was impossible to be satisfied that Parliament had intended, when enacting section 36 of the Administration of Justice Act 1970, that the mortgagee's common law right to take possession by virtue of his estate should be exercisable only with the assistance of the court. The only conclusion as to Parliament's intention which the court could properly reach was that which could be derived from the circumstances in which the section had been enacted, the statutory context in which it appeared, and the language used, and all pointed in the same direction.

This meant there would be no declaration to stop Barclays' repossession (taking place without a court order). The legislation could not be "otherwise construed", that is interpreted to provide that protection.

It does however strike me as very curious that mortgagors should only have protection in the case where the mortgagee chooses to take legal proceedings and not in the case where he chooses simply to enter the property.

It was not possible to infer that Parliament intended to cover such a case (i.e. use creative purposive interpretation).

Clarke LJ held under statute at the time, borrowers only have protection in the case where the lender has begun legal proceedings and not in the case of arrears where the lender simply has the right reserved where a demand is unpaid and chooses [if legally entitled] to enter. He added

the problem... in a case where the mortgagee has already exercised his power of sale, without having taken possession...The Law Commission has made proposals to reform the law in this field. It is for Parliament to decide whether to accept those or other proposals.

== Significance ==
The common law doctrine of peaceable entry by a mortgagee into mortgaged premises (allowed by mortgages which exclude section 103 of the Law of Property Act) may have been tempered by

1. The law of trespass; and
2. If a private home, incompatibility with Article 8 of the Human Rights Act 1998.

The judgment of the Court of Appeal in Ropaigealach may no longer be regarded as good law. An academic practitioner has devoted an article in a land law journal explaining that in a county court action his client-borrowers had, since 1998, sued their mortgagee (secured lender) who have exercised their purported rights to sell their home without any court order. The lender quickly agreed to pay damages and costs to the borrower rather than defend a claim in trespass. Decisions of the final court of appeal demonstrate that the application of the convention to the property relations of non-governmental persons is a challenging task, requiring the clearance of multiple hurdles.

In Manchester City Council v Pinnock the Supreme Court eventually accepted that HRA Art 8 created a freestanding statutory defence to a possession claim in respect of a person's home. It clarified that the meanings of Art 8 ECHR and Art 8 HRA 1998 Sch.1 in the context of lender's repossession as to a home are identical and therefore perhaps also any sale. It used Section 3 of the Human Rights Act 1998 to interpret a pre-1998 statute purposively.

This latter case was made trite law by the European Court of Human Rights in: Kay v United Kingdom [2011] H.L.R. 2 stating:

68. As the Court emphasised in McCann the loss of one's home is the most extreme form of interference with the right to respect for the home. Any person at risk of an interference of this magnitude should in principle be able to have the proportionality of the measure determined by an independent tribunal in light of the relevant principles under Article 8 of the Convention, notwithstanding that, under domestic law, his right to occupation has come to an end.’

The human rights incompatibility will be removed by:

1. Lending a new meaning to the Administration of Justice Act 1970 s.36;
2. Amending or abolishing the common law rule.

The High Court (Mr Justice Briggs) refused to remove the apparent incompatibility in 2008.

Completely obiter (in a landlord and tenant case) the unanimous panel (writing by two Supreme Justices) in the final court of appeal in a decision in 2016 said:

There are a number of types of residential occupiers who are not protected by the Protection from Eviction Act 1977, and who can therefore be physically (albeit peaceably) evicted, such as trespassers, bare licensees, sharers with the landlord and some temporary occupiers, as well, it appears, as mortgagors - see Ropaigealach v Barclays Bank plc [2000] QB 263.

== See also ==
- English land law
  - Mortgage law
- Human Rights Act 1998 (not considered in this decision as Act commenced 2 October 2000)
