= Governing Body of Clifton Middle School v Askew =

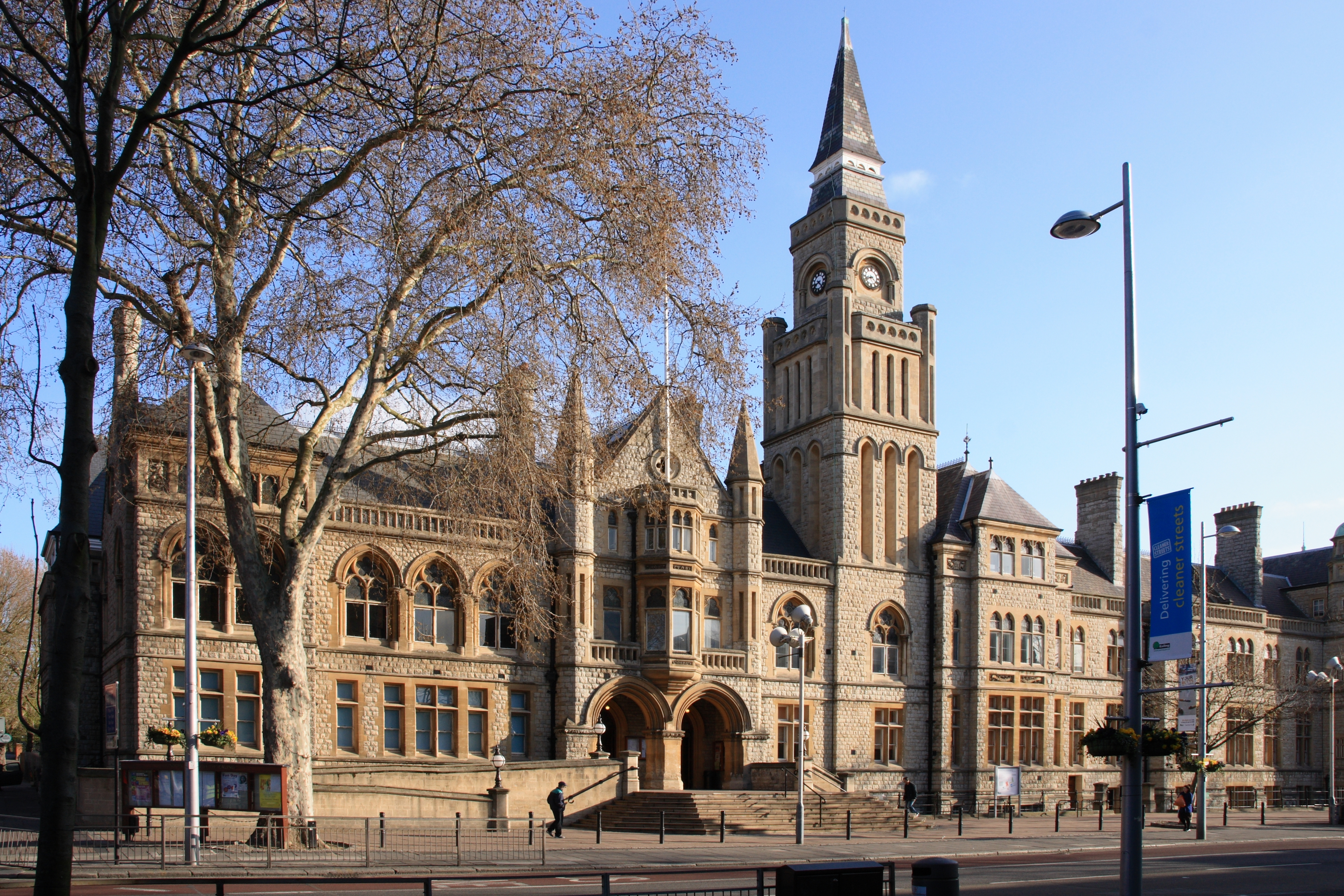
- London Borough of Ealing were named as respondents
- Court: Court of Appeal
- Full case name: Christopher Askey v (1) Governing Body of Clifton Middle School, and (2) London Borough of Ealing
- Decided: 20 July 1999
- Citation: [1999] EWCA Civ 1892, [2000] ICR 286
- Transcript: BAILII

Court membership
- Judges sitting: Peter Gibson LJ, Ward LJ, Chadwick LJ

Keywords
- Employee, TUPE regulations

Governing Body of Clifton Middle School v Askew [1999] EWCA 1892 is a UK labour law case, concerning the scope of protection for employees.

== Facts ==
Teachers had contracts of employment with the council. Their services were managed by the governors of the school, operating through the head teacher. The school was reorganised, to eliminate the first and middle schools, and create a new primary school. Mr Chris Askew was dismissed for redundancy and not offered a job at the replacement primary school. He argued there was a transfer under the Transfer of Undertakings Directive 77/187/EC. He said that although he had no employment contract with the governing body, he did have an employment relationship under the Directive. The Council argued that it was the employer in both the old and new school so there was no transfer.

== Judgment ==
The Court of Appeal held that there was no employment relationship. Peter Gibson LJ said an employment relationship comprised a contractual relation, but not necessarily one of employment. Ward LJ said it required the existence of legal rights and obligations that are capable of transfer. But they did not need to come from a contract, rather than some other source.

Chadwick LJ dissented in part, and thought that a source for Mr Askew's rights were found in the Education (Modification of Enactments Relating to Employment) Order 1989 (SI 1989/901).

== See also ==
- UK labour law
