= Waverley BC v Fletcher =

Waverley Borough Council v Fletcher [1995] 4 All ER 756 is an English Court of Appeal case.

== Facts ==
The defendant was using a metal detector in a park owned by the claimant, Waverley Borough Council. The defendant found a brooch and reported this to the authorities. The Coroner decided that it was not treasure trove. The issue was then who could claim the brooch—the claimant or the defendant.

== Judgment ==
The Court of Appeal held that the council had the better right to the brooch. As it had been found within or attached to the land, rather than on the surface, it belonged to the person who owned the soil.

== See also ==
- English property law
