= Parker v British Airways Board =

1982 English property law case

- Court: Court of Appeal
- Full case name: Parker v British Airways Board
- Decided: 21 December 1981
- Citations: [1982] 1 QB 1004; [1982] 2 WLR 503; [1982] 1 All ER 834

Case history
- Appealed from: County Court

Court membership
- Judges sitting: Donaldson LJ; Eveleigh LJ; Sir David Cairns

Parker v British Airways Board [1982] 1 QB 1004 is an English property law case ordered by the Court of Appeal.

== Background ==
A passenger named Parker discovered a gold bracelet on the floor of an executive lounge at Heathrow airport. He handed it to the owners of the land (British Airways Board) in order to search for the original owner, requesting that the item be returned to him should they fail to do so. When British Airways Board sold the unclaimed bracelet for £850, Mr Parker sued for damages, challenging their claim to the bracelet. During the first instance he was successful, and was awarded £850 as damages along with £50 as interest.

== Court of Appeal decision ==
=== Judgment ===
The judgment of Lord Donaldson begins the facts in a rather poetic manner:

On 15 November 1978, the plaintiff, Alan George Parker, had a date with fate - and perhaps with legal immortality. He found himself in the international executive lounge at terminal one, Heathrow Airport. And that is not all he found. He also found a gold bracelet lying on the floor.

We know very little about the plaintiff, and it would be nice to know more. He was lawfully in the lounge and, as events showed, he was an honest man. Clearly he had not forgotten the schoolboy maxim "Finders keepers." But, equally clearly, he was well aware of the adult qualification "unless the true owner claims the article".

=== Result ===
The court upheld Mr Parker's claim, as the bracelet was noticed in an area frequented by the public that British Airways Board did not exercise sufficient jurisdiction upon. British Airways Board were thus unable to assert superior title over the bracelet.

Donaldson LJ held that this was a case of "finders keepers".

The defendants could not assert any title to the bracelet based upon the rights of an occupier over chattels attached to a building. Here, the bracelet was lying on the floor.

There was no sufficient manifestation of any intention of the defendant to exercise control over lost property before it was found, which would otherwise give the defendants a right superior to that of the plaintiff or indeed any right over the bracelet.

The judgement laid out clear rules for both the Finder, and the Occupier of the Premises:

=== Rights and Obligations of Finder ===
1. No rights are acquired unless (a) the item is abandoned or lost and (b) the finder must take the item under their care and control to gain rights.
2. If the finder takes it into their care with dishonest intent or in the course of trespassing, then they acquire only limited rights
3. The finder only acquires any rights against the world as a whole. The true Owner, and anyone with a prior right to keep the item that existed when the finder took it into their care have better rights to the item.
4. Employees finding items in the course of their employment are finding it on behalf of their employer (unless there is agreement otherwise).
5. The finder has an obligation to inform the true owner that the item has been found and where it is by whatever means are reasonable in the circumstances. In the meantime, they have to take care of the item. (Note: Reasonable steps)

=== Rights and liabilities of the occupier ===
1. The occupier has better rights than the finder to the things embedded in or attached to land. Likewise the occupier has superior rights to things attached to a building, even if they did not know it was there. (Note: Embedded and Fixtures)
2. With regard to items in (or on top of) the building: The occupier has better rights only if they have manifested an intention to exercise control over the building and the things in it. (Note: Examples of exercising control)
3. If an occupier has manifested an intention to control they must maintain a Lost and Found facility. (In the manner that is reasonable under the circumstances.)
4. "Occupiers" of vehicles like boats, cars, airplanes, etc. are treated like the occupiers of buildings for these rules.

=== Clarifying Comments ===
- Reasonable Steps: Reasonable steps are not defined in the case, but there are usual methods such as lost and found boxes (which was the subject of the dispute), leaving word that you have it with people who inhabit or occupy the area, Craigslist, posters on telephone poles, classifieds in the newspaper, etc.
- Occupier: An occupier is a person occupying the building, land, etc. They could be the owner, tenant, etc.
- Embedded and Fixtures: If you find buried treasure on someone else's land, it is theirs. Likewise, the antique doorknob on the door in the cellar you found while exploring the tunnels no one has visited since grandma died is also owned by the property occupier (or is possessed to a greater degree; an actual property owner has even better rights to it than a renter.)
- Examples of Exercising Control: This can be viewed as a spectrum ranging from most control to lesser: Bank Vault, private home, commercial storeroom, airport lounge, then picnic table under a roof structure in a public park, to a public park. Some actual guiding examples are Grafstein where the occupier exercised control of the store room and all the items in it and succeeded against his employees as finders on several counts; versus Bridges v Hawkesworth, where a traveller found a package on the floor of a shop which the shopkeeper was not actively controlling at the time, and succeeded in his claim against the store owner.

== See also ==
- English property law
