= Copyhold =

Customary land tenure in a manorial estate

Copyhold was a form of customary land ownership common from the Late Middle Ages into modern times in England. The name for this type of land tenure is derived from the act of giving a copy of the relevant title deed that is recorded in the manorial court roll to the tenant, rather than the actual land deed itself. The legal owner of the manor land remained the mesne lord, who was legally the copyholder, according to the titles and customs written down in the manorial roll. In return for being given land, a copyhold tenant was required to carry out specific manorial duties or services. The specific rights and duties of copyhold tenants varied greatly from one manor to another and many were established by custom. By the 19th century, many customary duties had been replaced with the payment of rent.

Copyhold was directly descended from the feudal system of villeinage which involved giving service and produce to the local lord in return for land. Although feudalism in England had ended by the early 1500s, forms of copyhold tenure continued in England until being completely abolished by the Law of Property Act 1925.

== Principles ==
The privileges granted to each tenant, and the exact services he was to render to the lord of the manor and/or lord paramount in return for them, were described in the roll or book kept by the steward, who gave a copy of the relevant entry to the tenant. Consequently, these tenants were afterwards called copyholders, in contrast to freeholders. The actual term "copyhold" is first recorded in 1483, and "copyholder" in 1511–1512. The specific rights and duties of copyholders varied greatly from one manor to another and many were established by custom. Initially, some works and services to the lord were required of copyholders (four days' work per year for example), but these were commuted later to a rent equivalent. Each manor custom laid out rights to use various resources of the land such as wood and pasture, and numbers of animals allowed on the common. Copyholds very commonly required the payment of a type of death duty called a heriot to the lord of the manor upon the decease of the copyholder.

== Inheritance ==
Two main kinds of copyhold tenure developed:

- Copyhold of inheritance: with one main tenant landholder who paid rent and undertook duties to the lord. When he died, the holding normally passed to his next heir(s) – who might be the eldest son or, if no son existed, the eldest daughter (primogeniture); the youngest son or, if no son existed, the youngest daughter ("Borough English" or ultimogeniture); or all sons or all children in equal or otherwise prescribed shares (partible inheritance or "gavelkind"), depending upon the custom of that particular manor. In practice, local rules of inheritance were often applied with considerable flexibility. During their life the tenant could usually 'sell' the holding to another person by formally surrendering it to the lord of the manor on the condition that the lord regrant it to the 'buyer'. This three-party transaction was recorded in the manorial roll and formed the new 'copyhold' for the purchaser.
- Copyhold for lives: where several (usually three) named persons held the premises for the duration of their lives. The first-named life tenant acted as tenant and paid rent and heriots; while the other two were said to be "in reversion and remainder" and effectively formed a queue. When the first life died, the second-named inherited the property and nominated a new third life for the end of the new queue. These were recorded in the court rolls as the "copyhold" for this type of tenant. It was possible to exchange the reversion and remainder lives with different ones during a lifetime upon payment of a fine to the lord. However, it was not usually possible for these holdings to be sold, as there were three lives with an entitlement. Copyhold for lives is therefore regarded as a less secure tenancy than copyhold of inheritance.

Copyhold land often did not appear in a will. This is because its inheritance was already pre-determined by custom, as just described. It could not therefore be given or devised in a will to any other person. In some instances, the executor of the estate held the copyhold for the term of one year after the decease of the testator, which was called the "executor's year", in parallel with the same concept in common law. Language regarding the disposal of the profits of the executor's year or of a heriot often indicates a copyhold.

== Abolition ==
Copyhold Act 1841 (Note: Section 54 of the Copyhold Act 1852 (15 & 16 Vict. c. 51).)
- Act of Parliament
- Parliament of the United Kingdom
- Long title: An Act for the Commutation of certain Manorial Rights in respect of Lands of Copyhold and Customary Tenure, and in respect of other Lands subject to such Rights, and for facilitating the Enfranchisement of such Lands, and for the Improvement of such Tenure.
- Citation: 4 & 5 Vict. c. 35
- Territorial extent: United Kingdom

Dates
- Royal assent: 21 June 1841
- Commencement: 21 June 1841 (Note: The Acts of Parliament (Commencement) Act 1793.)
- Repealed: 25 August 1894

Other legislation
- Amended by: Copyhold Act 1843; Copyhold Act 1844; Copyhold Act 1852; Copyhold Act 1858; Copyhold Act 1887; Public Authorities Protection Act 1893
- Repealed by: Copyhold Act 1894

Status: Repealed

Text of statute as originally enacted

Copyhold Act 1843
- Act of Parliament
- Parliament of the United Kingdom
- Long title: An Act to amend and explain an Act for the Commutation of certain Manorial Rights in respect of Lands of Copyhold and Customary Tenure, and in respect of other Lands subject to such Rights and for facilitating the Enfranchisement of such Lands, and for the Improvement of such Tenure.
- Citation: 6 & 7 Vict. c. 23
- Territorial extent: United Kingdom

Dates
- Royal assent: 27 June 1843
- Commencement: 27 June 1843
- Repealed: 25 August 1894

Other legislation
- Amends: Copyhold Act 1841
- Amended by: Copyhold Act 1844; Copyhold Act 1852; Copyhold Act 1858; Copyhold Act 1887
- Repealed by: Copyhold Act 1894

Status: Repealed

Text of statute as originally enacted

Copyhold Act 1844
- Act of Parliament
- Parliament of the United Kingdom
- Long title: An Act to amend and explain the Acts for the Commutation of certain Manorial Rights in respect of Lands of Copyhold and Customary Tenure, and in respect of other Lands subject to such Rights; and for facilitating the Enfranchisement of such Lands, and for the Improvement of such Tenure.
- Citation: 7 & 8 Vict. c. 55
- Territorial extent: United Kingdom

Dates
- Royal assent: 29 July 1844
- Commencement: 29 July 1844
- Repealed: 25 August 1894

Other legislation
- Amends: Copyhold Act 1841; Copyhold Act 1843
- Amended by: Copyhold Act 1852; Copyhold Act 1858; Statute Law Revision Act 1874 (No. 2); Copyhold Act 1887
- Repealed by: Copyhold Act 1894

Status: Repealed

Text of statute as originally enacted

Copyhold Act 1852 (Note: Section 54.)
- Act of Parliament
- Parliament of the United Kingdom
- Long title: An Act to extend the Provisions of the Acts for the Commutation of Manorial Rights, and for the gradual Enfranchisement of Lands of Copyhold and Customary Tenure.
- Citation: 15 & 16 Vict. c. 51
- Territorial extent: United Kingdom

Dates
- Royal assent: 30 June 1852
- Commencement: 30 June 1852
- Repealed: 25 August 1894

Other legislation
- Amends: Copyhold Act 1841; Copyhold Act 1843; Copyhold Act 1844
- Amended by: Copyhold Act 1858; Statute Law Revision Act 1875; Copyhold Act 1887
- Repealed by: Copyhold Act 1894

Status: Repealed

Text of statute as originally enacted

Copyhold Act 1858 (Note: Section 52.)
- Act of Parliament
- Parliament of the United Kingdom
- Long title: An Act to amend the Copyhold Acts.
- Citation: 21 & 22 Vict. c. 94
- Territorial extent: United Kingdom

Dates
- Royal assent: 2 August 1858
- Commencement: 1 October 1858 (Note: Section 1.)
- Repealed: 25 August 1894

Other legislation
- Amends: Copyhold Act 1841; Copyhold Act 1843; Copyhold Act 1844; Copyhold Act 1852
- Amended by: Copyhold Act 1887
- Repealed by: Copyhold Act 1894

Status: Repealed

Text of statute as originally enacted

Copyhold Act 1887 (Note: Section 50.)
- Act of Parliament
- Parliament of the United Kingdom
- Long title: An Act to amend the Copyhold Acts, and for the Enfranchisement of Copyhold and Customary Lands.
- Citation: 50 & 51 Vict. c. 73
- Territorial extent: United Kingdom

Dates
- Royal assent: 16 September 1887
- Commencement: 16 September 1887
- Repealed: 25 August 1894

Other legislation
- Amends: Copyhold Act 1841; Copyhold Act 1843; Copyhold Act 1844; Copyhold Act 1852; Copyhold Act 1858
- Repealed by: Copyhold Act 1894

Status: Repealed

Text of statute as originally enacted

Copyholds were gradually enfranchised (turned into ordinary holdings of land – either freehold or 999-year leasehold) as a result of the Copyhold Acts during the 19th century. By this time, servitude to the lord of the manor was merely token, discharged on purchasing the copyhold by payment of a "fine in respite of fealty". The Copyhold Act 1841 (4 & 5 Vict. c. 35), Copyhold Act 1843 (6 & 7 Vict. c. 23), Copyhold Act 1844 (7 & 8 Vict. c. 55), Copyhold Act 1852 (15 & 16 Vict. c. 51), Copyhold Act 1858 (21 & 22 Vict. c. 94) and Copyhold Act 1887 (50 & 51 Vict. c. 73) were consolidated in the Copyhold Act 1894 (57 & 58 Vict. c. 46).

Part V of the Law of Property Act 1925 (15 & 16 Geo. 5. c. 20) finally abolished all remaining statutes.

== See also ==
- Feudal land tenure
- History of English land law, including:
  - Grand and petty serjeanty, rent in various services
  - Knight-service, rent in military service
  - Frankalmoin or free alms, rent in religious service
  - Socage, rent in goods or cash, including such forms as:
    - Gavelkind, partible inheritance
    - Borough English, inheritance by the youngest son
    - Burgage, urban property, often including voting rights, with various rent conditions
  - Villein (a type of tenure which preceded copyhold)
