= Abbott v Abbott =

- Court: Judicial Committee of the Privy Council
- Citations: [2007] UKPC 53, [2008] 1 FLR 1451

Case history
- Prior action: Court of Appeal of Antigua and Barbuda

Keywords
- trust, family home

Abbott v Abbott [2007] UKPC 53 was a decision by the Privy Council on a case from the Court of Appeal of Antigua and Barbuda that became important for English land law and constructive trusts.

The case involved a married couple disputing their respective ownership shares in property, where the husband held legal title but the wife claimed a beneficial interest. The Privy Council's ruling was significant because it established that courts should consider the parties' entire course of conduct when determining property rights, rather than focusing narrowly on direct financial contributions. This broader approach made it easier for individuals to establish equitable interests in property where they had contributed through non-financial means, marking an important shift away from the more restrictive principles established in Lloyds Bank plc v Rosset. The decision has particular relevance for protecting the property rights of spouses and cohabiting partners.

== Facts ==
Mr. and Mrs. Abbott were in Antigua and Barbuda and were married. There the shares would still be determined by property law. Mr Abbott was the registered owner. Mr Abbott did not dispute that Mrs Abbott had a share, but disputed the amount.

== Judgment ==
Baroness Hale, delivering the opinion of the Board, said the following.

19. The Court of Appeal appears to have attached undue significance to the dictum of Lord Bridge in Lloyds Bank plc v Rosset, in particular as to what conduct is to be taken into account in quantifying an acknowledged beneficial interest. The law has indeed moved on since then. The parties' whole course of conduct in relation to the property must be taken into account in determining their shared intentions as to its ownership.

== See also ==
- English land law
- English property law
