= Thomas v Times Book Co =

Thomas v Times Book Company
- Court: High Court, Chancery Division
- Full case name: Thomas v Times Book Company Limited, Cox and Cleverdon
- Citation: [1966] 1 WLR 911

Court membership
- Judge sitting: Plowman J

Keywords
- Gift

Thomas v Times Book Company [1966] 1 WLR 911 is an English law case, in which the legal requirements of making gifts were explored.

== Facts ==
On Monday 19 October 1953, writer Dylan Thomas told BBC producer Douglas Cleverdon that he could keep the original manuscript of the play Under Milk Wood – if he could find it. Thomas had lost the manuscript a few days earlier in a London pub, but Cleverdon had made copies. Thomas made the promise to Cleverdon as he handed over three copies in London's Victoria Station, from where Thomas was due to journey to America to promote the play - Thomas suggested a number of likely locations for the manuscript, and a day or two later, Cleverdon successfully found it. Unfortunately Thomas died whilst still abroad. His wife claimed the manuscript back, originally from the Times Book Company who had possession of it. Mr Cleverdon and another party were later added as defendants to the claim.

The overall issue was the question of what is required to make a gift. The judge analysed this into what is required to deduce intention to make a gift, and what is required to make effective delivery of the manuscript as a gift.

== Judgement ==
Plowman J found that there was intention to make a gift and there was satisfactory delivery, and therefore a valid gift was made. Because Mr Thomas had told Mr Cleverdon that the manuscript was his to keep, there was intention to make a gift and because Mr Thomas had told Mr Cleverdon where he might find the manuscript, and as Mr Cleverdon succeeded in finding it from one of those locations within two days, there was effective delivery. Although there were evidential difficulties about who said what at a railway station over twelve years before, and one of the parties was now dead, the judge did not dismiss the claim as being out of time. The judge followed the advice of Brett MR in Re Garnett that he should be suspicious of claims made against dead men, as they are unable to argue for themselves, yet need not place any undue "corroborative" burden on the evidence of those still alive. He did however give more weight to Mr Cleverdon's statements than those of Ruthven Todd, whom Mr Thomas met shortly on arriving in America, in finding that Mr Todd's evidence was second hand. The judge accepted Mr Cleverdon's evidence through logical inference. The day after the promise was made at Victoria Station, Mr Cleverdon told his secretary the story, even though Mr Thomas was still alive and due back in a few days. The judge reasoned that Mr Cleverdon would have not lied, as such a lie would have been quickly exposed if, as expected, Mr Thomas had returned safe and well.

== Significance ==
Plowman J did not give a wide ratio. It is not clear whether a gift would have been made if Mr Thomas had not listed locations, or if the manuscript was not at those locations, or if it took much longer to find.
