= Carrier's Case =

English court case

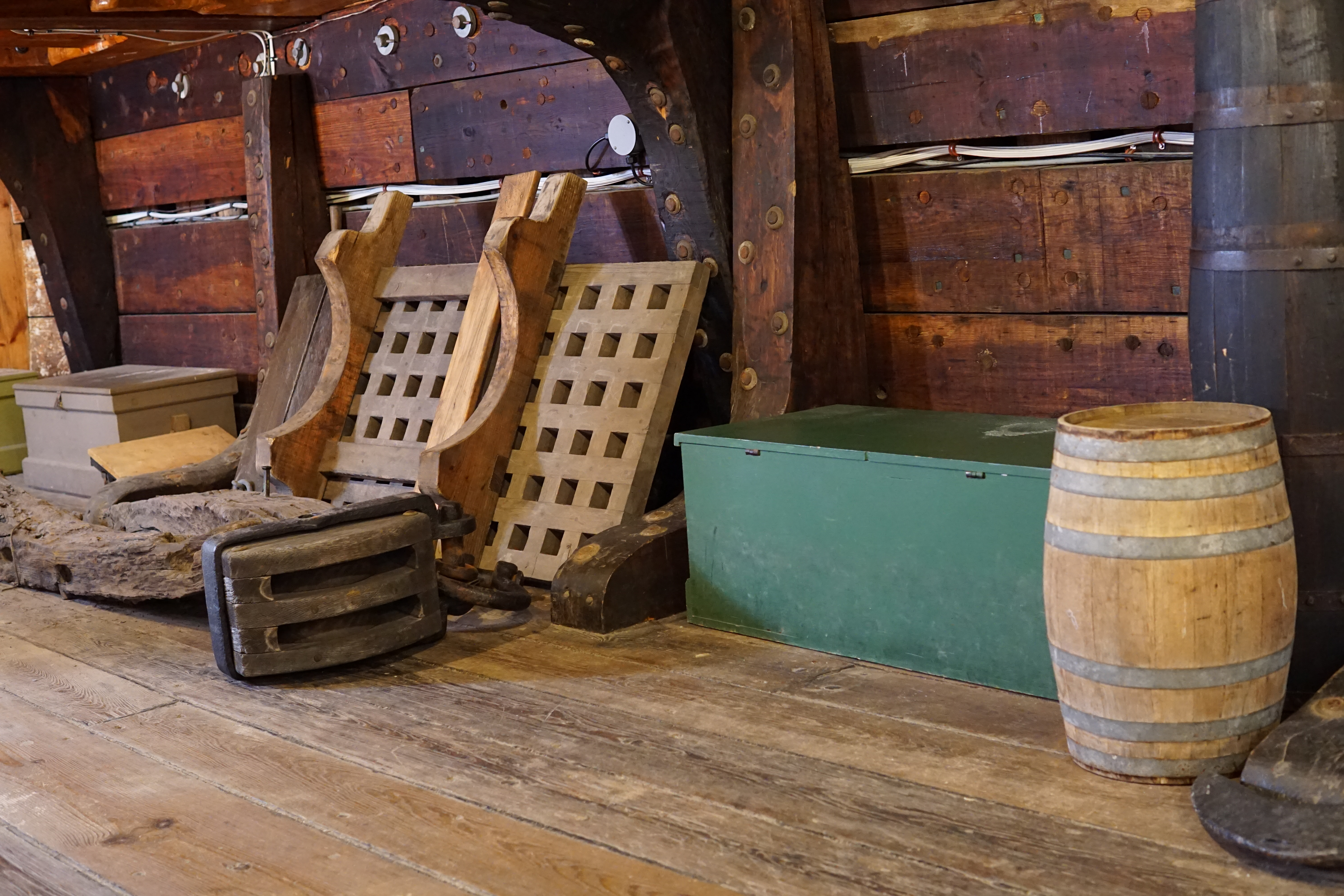
- Court: Star Chamber
- Full case name: Anonymous v. The Sheriff of London
- Decided: 1473
- Citations: YB. Pasch. 13 Edw. IV, f. 9., pl. 5 (1473). 64 Selden Soc. (1945)

Case history
- Subsequent action: none

Court membership
- Judges sitting: Lord Chokke and others

Keywords
- Breaking bulk; larceny by unlawful conversion; duties of bailees; royal safe conduct

Carrier's Case (Anonymous v. The Sheriff of London, The Case of Carrier Who Broke Bulk) (1473) was a landmark English court case in the history of the definition of larceny. Until this ruling, when an owner voluntarily handed over physical possession of property to the custody of another, and it was then converted (in title: made that of another), there was no felonious larceny as larceny required trespass of the owner's or bailee's place or person (violence or the threat of violence).

The English courts henceforth adopted the "breaking bulk" doctrine. If someone transporting a bulk or bale (bundle) of merchandise (the carrier) on behalf of someone else, and breaks it open without permission, express or implied, (thus converts them to the carrier's own use), it is the crime of larceny. The case was significant because in common law at that time, larceny required a trespass by force and arms (vi et armis) or against the peace, which did not occur if the person was willingly handed the bulk or bales of items. The breaking of the bulk was found to be the required force needed in the element of trespass. In the underlying case, one justice (Chokke [J.C.P]) stated that if the carrier sold the entire bale unbroken, then kept the proceeds for his own use, the act would not have the (at the time) element of (violent) trespass, so would not be larceny, but the breaking of the bulk satisfied the trespass element.

== Facts ==
A carrier was hired by a Flemish merchant to transport bales of woad (a type of dye) to the port in Southampton. He opened the bales and took the goods for himself. Some of it came into possession of the Sheriff of London. The sheriff gave it to the King (forfeited as "waif", a word to signify runaways or stolen goods). The merchant sued the sheriff to return the goods; he argued that the goods were not stolen, that the carrier only had temporary property rights and so the goods could not be given to the King. The Sheriff argued that the goods were stolen, that it was a felony and therefore properly forfeited to the King as waif.

The legal relationship between the carrier and the merchant, as now, would have been seen as one of bailee and bailor, such that bailees have a duty of reasonable care for others' property they possess. The merchant had royal safe conduct covering his goods. This meant that if the goods were stolen, they would not be given to the Crown by the use of a waif. This happened in medieval times when a good was stolen. When the stolen goods were found, they became property of the King.

== Judgment ==
The judges all agreed that the actions of the carrier constituted larceny, but they could not agree on a rationale. The prevailing reason was provided by Lord Chokke who concluded that the carrier had lawful possession of the bales only. The merchant retained constructive possession of the contents. Therefore, when the carrier broke open the bales and removed the contents, he committed the crime of larceny because he had taken the contents from the possession of the merchant. The merchant had a royal safe conduct covering his goods. The merchant argued that this protection meant that even if his goods were stolen, as the court had determined, they would not be forfeited to the King as waif. The court agreed with the merchant on this second point and the Sheriff was required to return the goods to the merchant.

The carrier had temporary possession of the goods with permission of the merchant so had no right to 'break bulk', i.e., he broke up the bales and began to sell them. The fact that he broke bulk shows the intention to commit larceny. He was therefore guilty; the goods would ordinarily forfeit to the king absolutely (in that era). However, due to the royal safe conduct that the merchant had, he was entitled to his goods back.

== See also ==
- English law
