= Burns v Burns =

English legal case on cohabiting couples

Burns v Burns ([1984] EWCA Civ 4) is a case in English property law dealing with the beneficial entitlements of unmarried cohabittees.

== Facts ==
The plaintiff, Valerie Burns, lived with the defendant for 19 years, Patrick Burns, whom she never married. The house had been bought in the name of the defendant who also paid the purchase price with the plaintiff making no financial contributions to the purchase price or mortgage installments and had acted as a homemaker performing domestic duties. She had however made financial contributions to the household with regards to household bills and redecorating.

== Judgment ==
The judgment of the case was that in the absence of a financial contribution which could be related to the acquisition to the property such as mortgage installments there is no right to a beneficial entitlement to a family home. This decision was affirmed by the Lords Justice Waller, Fox and May in the Court of Appeal.

It has been widely discussed in the debate over the fairness of the law as it applies to cohabitants.
