= Rule in Dearle v Hall =

1828 rule in English common law

Rule in Dearle V. Hall
- Court: English Common Law
- Decided: 1828
- Citation: 3 Russ 1

Case history
- Related action: Trust Law

Court membership
- Judge sitting: Lord Macnaghten

Case opinions
- Decision by: 1893

Keywords
- Equity law

The rule in Dearle v Hall (1828) 3 Russ 1 is an English common law rule to determine priority between competing equitable claims to the same asset. The rule broadly provides that where the equitable owner of an asset purports to dispose of his equitable interest on two or more occasions, and the equities are equal between claimants, the claimant who first notifies the trustee or legal owner of the asset shall have a first priority claim.

Although the original decisions related to interests under a trust, most modern applications of the rule relate to the factoring of receivables or multiple grants of equitable security interests.

The rule has been subject to some scathing criticism, and has been abrogated in a number of common law countries in the Commonwealth.

== History ==
The rule in Dearle v Hall has been controversial almost since its inception. In 1893, Lord Macnaghten said "I am inclined to think that the rule in Dearle v Hall has on the whole produced at least as much injustice as it has prevented." But this has not stopped it from being extended from a rule regulating the priority of interests in trusts to the regulation of the priority of proprietary interests in debts and other similar intangibles, such as rights under contracts, which is considerably more important in terms of modern commerce.

The actual decision in Dearle v Hall, on its facts, is relatively uncontroversial. The beneficial owner of a trust fund assigned it first by way of security to A, and then outright to B, in each case for valuable consideration. A had not given notice of his assignment to the trustees of the fund and, accordingly, when B made enquiries of them, he did not discover the existence of the assignment to A because the trustees were not aware of it. B did give notice of the assignment to the trustees, and then A subsequently also gave notice to them. Plumer MR and, on appeal, Lord Lyndhurst LC each decided that B took priority over A.

Judgment was given in favour of B for two reasons. The first was based on the general proposition, that, as between two equitable interests, the first in time will only take priority "if the equities are equal". In this case, by failing to give notice to the trustees, A had allowed the beneficiary of the trust to be able to hold himself out as being the unencumbered owner of the beneficial interest and had therefore enabled the beneficiary to hoodwink B into thinking he had not encumbered it. This is a perfectly straightforward application of the principle that the first in time will only prevail if the equities are equal and is not considered controversial.

The second ground for the decision was that A's failure to give notice had left the beneficiary of the trust in apparent possession of the trust fund, and A could not, therefore, rely on this assignment in a dispute with B. This latter ground has been criticised as it appears to be based on the concept of reputed ownership in bankruptcy law, which had never previously been employed in determining priority between competing equitable claims. Nevertheless, on the facts of the case most commentators feel that justice was done; A had allowed the beneficiary to commit a fraud on B, and therefore A should rank behind B.

== Development ==
However, it was in subsequent developments that the rule was turned from an example of the principle that the first in time rule will not apply if the equities are not equal into an absolute rule that the first to give notice will take priority unless the later assignee was a volunteer or was aware of the earlier assignment at the time he obtained his assignment. The rule applies even if the later assignee made no enquiries of the trustees and even if the first assignee was not negligent in failing to give notice, for instance because he was not aware of it or because there was no one to whom notice could be given. In Ward v Duncombe [1893] AC 369, the House of Lords decided that the rule that notice determines priority of dealings applied regardless of the conduct of the competing assignees.

== Criticisms ==
In spite of the criticisms of the way in which the rule in Dearle v Hall has developed, there is much to be said for the concept that the priority of assignments or charges over debts should, as a general rule, depend on the date notice is given to the person who owes the debt. Not least, this is because the person who owes the debt will get a good discharge by paying the creditor unless he has been notified of the assignment or charge. Once a debt has been paid, it ceases to exist, and the priority rule recognises this fact. That is not to say that, in appropriate cases, it would not be possible for one creditor to trace the proceeds of the debt into the hands of another. But a simple rule that both priority and discharge depend on notice has much to recommend it.

Most of the academic criticism of the rule is to the effect that it has been carried too far. Whilst it is generally accepted for a subsequent assignee for value to take priority over an earlier assignee by giving notice before he becomes aware of the earlier assignment, it seems harsh for the earlier assignee to lose priority where the notice is given by the subsequent assignee after he is aware of the earlier assignment. The net result is the priority depends upon the subsequent speed of response of the parties once one or both of them becomes aware of the problem.

== Reform ==
The Law Commission of England and Wales, as part of a wider view of priority rules relating to security interests has recommended the abolition of the rule in Dearle v Hall in relation to security interests and assignments of receivables only, and its replacement with a system of registration. To date, such recommendations have not been implemented.
