= Pur autre vie =

In property law of countries with a common law background, including the United States and some Canadian provinces, pur autre vie (Law French for "for another['s] life") is a duration of a proprietary freehold interest in the form of a variant of a life estate.

While it is similar to a standard life estate pur sa vie (for his or her own life), it differs in that a person's life interest will last for the life of another person, the cestui que vie, instead of his or her own. For example, if Bob is given use of the family house for as long as his mother lives, he has possession of the house pur autre vie. A life estate pur autre vie can be created when a contingent remainder is destroyed, in a Doctrine of Merger situation, where one person acquires the life estate of another and thereby destroys a remainder not already vested. It can also arise when a life tenant alienates his life estate to another, whereby the person to whom the estate is devised gains a life estate pur autre vie of the original life tenant.
