= English trust law =

Creation and protection of asset funds

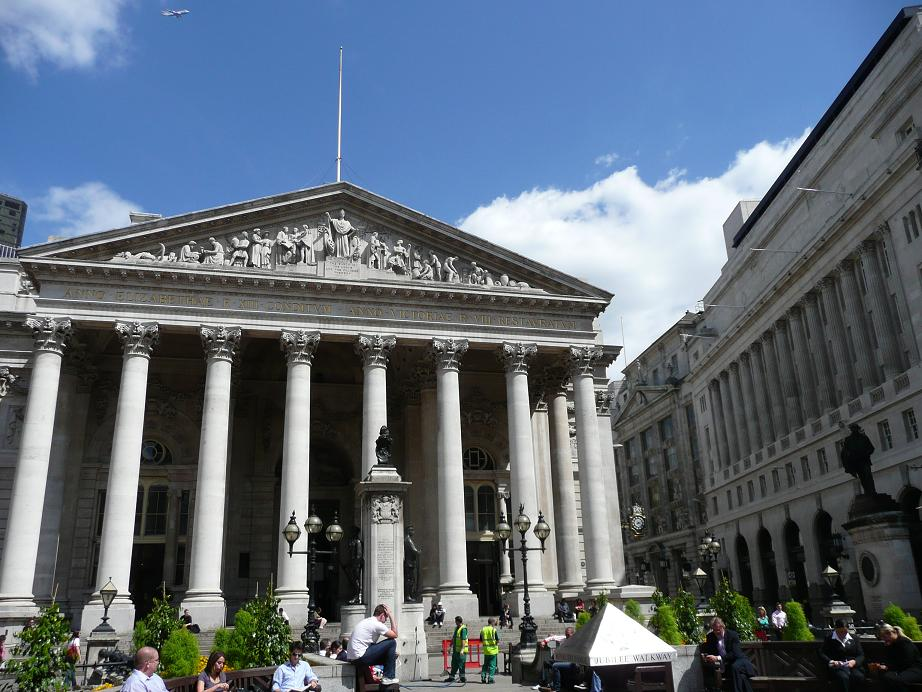
Trusts and fiduciary duties matter when property is managed by one person for another's benefit. Most trust money comes from people saving for retirement. In 2011, UK pension funds held over £1 trillion of assets, and unit trusts held £583.8 billion.

English trust law comprises the statutory and case law that govern the formation and operation of trusts, and the associated remedies for breach or failure of trust, in England and Wales. In English law, a trust is a legal relationship that involves one or more trustees holding an asset for a set of beneficiaries.

Trusts were a creation of the courts of equity in Medieval and early modern England, originating in the law of property and obligations. Historically, trusts were primarily used where people left money in a will, or created family settlements, charities, or some types of business venture. Today, trusts also play an important role in financial investment, especially in unit trusts and in pension trusts.

Express trusts are created by a settlor, who transfers assets to one or more trustees (which may include themselves), who undertake to use the assets for the benefit of beneficiaries. Subject to certain exceptions (e.g. charitable trusts and some non-charitable purpose trusts), English law requires a trust to have ascertainable beneficiaries. Beyond these expressly created trusts, English law recognises resulting and constructive trusts, which are imposed by the operation of law.

If trustees breach their duties, beneficiaries may seek restoration of trust property or compensation for loss caused by the breach. They may also follow trust property or trace its proceeds and, where the requirements of the relevant claim are met, recover property or pursue personal claims against third parties.

Legislation that regulates English trust law include Trustee Act 1925, Trustee Investments Act 1961, Recognition of Trusts Act 1987, Financial Services and Markets Act 2000, Trustee Act 2000, Pensions Act 1995, Pensions Act 2004 and Charities Act 2011.

== History ==
"The same thing, then, is just and equitable, and while both are good the equitable is superior. What creates the problem is that the equitable is just, but not the legally just but a correction of legal justice. The reason is that all law is universal but about some things it is not possible to make a universal statement which shall be correct.... And this is the nature of the equitable, a correction of law where it is defective owing to its universality.... the man who chooses and does such acts, and is no stickler for his rights in a bad sense but tends to take less than his share though he has the law on his side, is equitable, and this state of character is equity".

— Aristotle, Nicomachean Ethics (350 BC) Book V, pt 10

Statements of equitable principle stretch back to the Ancient Greeks in the work of Aristotle, while examples of rules analogous to trusts were found in the Roman law testamentary institution of the fideicommissum. However, English trusts law is a largely indigenous development that began in the Middle Ages, from the time of the 11th and 12th century crusades.

The "common law" of all England traces its origin to the Norman Conquest of 1066. During the crusades, landowners who went to fight would transfer title to their land to a person they trusted so that feudal services could be performed and received, but many who returned found that the people they entrusted refused to transfer their title deed back. Sometimes, common law courts would not acknowledge that anybody had rights in the property except the holder of the legal title deeds. So claimants petitioned the King to sidestep the common law courts. The King delegated hearing of petitions to his Lord Chancellor, who established the Court of Chancery as more cases were heard. Where it appeared "inequitable" to let someone with legal title hold onto land, the Lord Chancellor could declare that the real owner in equity was another person.

=== Uses (before c. 1535) ===
The Court of Chancery determined that the true "use" or "benefit" of property did not belong to the person on the title (or the feoffee who held seisin). The cestui que use, the owner in equity, could be a different person. So English law recognised a split between legal and equitable owner, between someone who controlled title and another for whose benefit the land would be used. It was the beginning of trust law. The same logic was useful for Franciscan friars, who would transfer title of land to others as they were precluded from holding property by their vows of poverty.

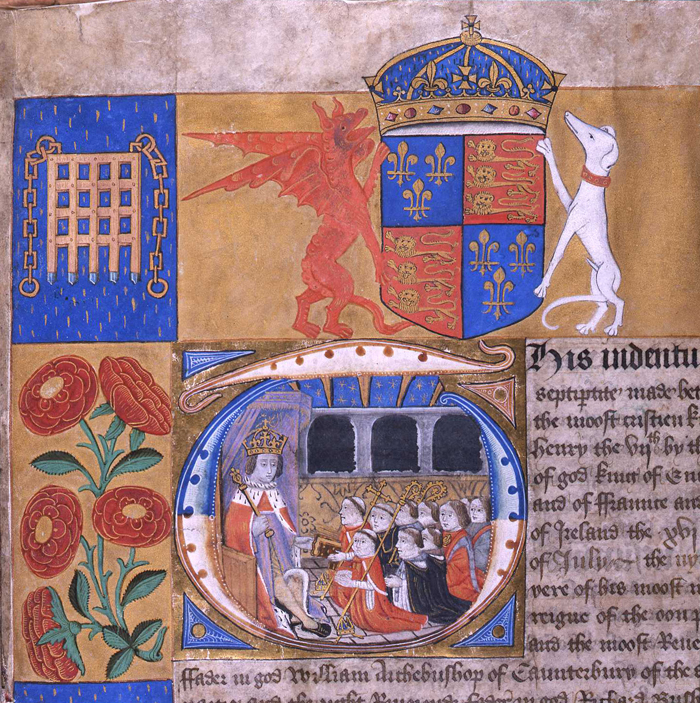
The Star Chamber (est. circa 1398) played the role of a criminal court of "equity", where judges on the king's authority could impose punishments that deviated from the law. It was abolished by the Habeas Corpus Act 1640, although in civil matters the Court of Chancery continued operation until 1875.

During the 15th century and 16th century, "uses" or "trusts" were also employed to avoid the payment of feudal taxation. If a person died, the law stated a landlord was entitled to money before the land passed to an heir, and the landlord got all of the property under the doctrine of escheat if there were no heirs. Transferring title to a group of people for common use could ensure this never happened, because if one person died he could be replaced, and it was unlikely for all to die at the same time.

=== Statute of Uses (c. 1535) ===
King Henry VIII saw that this deprived the Crown of revenue, and so in the Statute of Uses 1535 he attempted to prohibit uses, stipulating all land belonged in fact to the cestui que use. Henry VIII also increased the role of the Court of Star Chamber, a court with criminal jurisdiction that invented new rules as it thought fit, and often this was employed against political dissidents. However, when Henry VIII was gone, the Court of Chancery held that the Statute of Uses 1535 had no application where land was leased. People started entrusting property again for family legacies.

Trusts grew more popular, and were tolerated by the Crown, as new sources of revenue from the mercantile exploits in the New World decreased the Crown's reliance on feudal dues. By the early 18th century, the use had formalised into a trust: where land was settled to be held by a trustee, for the benefit of another, the Courts of Chancery recognised the beneficiary as the true owner in equity.

=== Merger of law and equity (c. late 1800s) ===
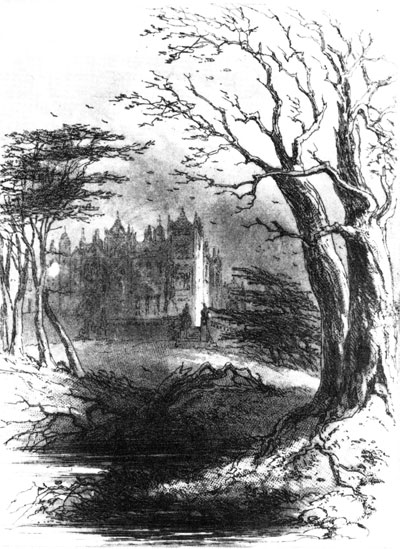
In his book Bleak House (1853), Charles Dickens pilloried the Court of Chancery's arcane and tedious practices, exemplified in his fictional case of Jarndyce v Jarndyce. Within two decades, Parliament abolished the court, and merged equity with the common law through the Supreme Court of Judicature Act 1873, and its successor Judicature Acts.

Parliament merged the common law and equity courts into one system with the Supreme Court of Judicature Act 1873. Equitable principles would prevail over common law rules in case of conflict. The trust largely continued as before. In other parts of the Commonwealth (or the British Empire at the time) trust law principles, as then understood, were codified for the purpose of easy administration.

== Concept and theory ==
Hanbury and Martin define the trust as:

[A] relationship recognised by equity which arises where property is vested in a person or persons called the trustees, which those trustees are obliged to hold for the benefit of other persons called the beneficiaries.

Other doctrinal characteristics of trust law include the trust instrument; that the subject matter of the trust is property; and that equitable interests to trust property are not binding on bona fide purchasers ("equity's darling"). Trusts also involve a fiduciary relationship between the trustee and beneficiary, with the trustee having a legal interest in the property and the owner having an equitable one. As equitable remedies, trusts can also be imposed where a court finds it equitable to do so, or they may be imposed by the operation of law. Trusts can also be distinguished from bailments, agents, contracts, debts, charges, wills, and choses.

English law generally recognises two broad categories of trusts: private trusts and public (charitable) trusts. Three kinds of private trusts are also generally recognised by the courts: express trusts, constructive trusts, and resulting trusts. Sub-types of express trusts include discretionary trusts, testamentary trusts, inter vivos trusts, and employee trusts. Constructive and resulting trusts are sometimes called implied trusts (as opposed to express trusts), but the use of the term is controversial. Mutual wills, bare trusts, quistclose trusts, secret trusts, and some forms of purpose trusts have also been recognised as types of trusts.

=== Fusion debate ===
Because trust law derived from the Lord Chancellor and courts of equity, there has been debate over the extent to which that common law and equity have and should be fused. Before the Supreme Court of Judicature Act 1873 and 1875, Edward Coke and William Blackstone had disapproved the notion that equitable jurisdiction was in some way distinct from the law. Per the Acts, where there was a conflict, the precedents of the courts of equity would prevail. But there remained disagreement about whether this was meant to achieve fusion in substance or merely in procedure.

In Australia, equity represents a distinctive set of principles and its own logic, as manifested in the institutions it created, such as the trust. In England, Andrew Burrows has argued that, when the situations are functionally identical, the courts should treat like cases alike in both common law and equity, such that the rules in equity and common law ought not to conflict.

In practice, the debate about the fusion of law and equity has waned in importance in debates about private law and the law of trusts.

=== Categorisation in private law ===
There has been debate about the appropriate taxonomy that underlies the law of trusts. When English law was being codified and exported through the British Empire, for example in the Indian Trusts Act 1882, the authors thought it was thought appropriate to describe a trust as "an obligation annexed to the ownership of property", implying a view often restated, that "equity acts in personam". On the other hand, it has been consistently held that the beneficiary of a trust holds a proprietary right. This enables the beneficiary to claim priority over some (but not all) non-proprietary creditors in insolvency, or the beneficiary to bring a direct action in tort against a defendant who has damaged trust property. It is also acknowledged that the beneficiary may trace money that has wrongly been dissipated from the trust, but unlike a legal property owner, perhaps not against a bona fide purchaser. Peter Birks, on this ground, has suggested that beneficial interests trusts are a slightly weaker form of proprietary right.

Ben McFarlane and Robert Stevens have alternatively suggested that beneficial interests are neither personal nor proprietary, but instead a "right against a right". One of the difficulties underpinning the debate is that it assumes the distinction between obligations (which operate only between persons) and property (which either operate against a thing, or bind third parties) is a coherent one: "proprietary" rights do not ultimately operate against "things" rather than people, while supposedly "personal" obligations bind third parties who would interfere with them as much as proprietary rights are thought to. It would follow that a "right against a right" is conceptually incomplete, because a right is an abstract thing that cannot bear a duty: a person does. On this view the function of trusts is to form part of a system of priorities among all rights (regardless of their historical status as personal or property right) when faced of conflicts over assets, particularly against other creditors of an insolvent debtor.

A second aspect of the debate among those who favour substantive fusion is (beyond whether rights in trusts are personal or proprietary) which underlying "event" to which different trusts "respond". Adding to the scheme of Gaius, that saw obligations as coming from contracts and wrongs, unjust enrichment lawyers emphasised that their field was a neglected tertium quid. According to the most influential scheme advocated by Peter Birks, obligations divide into consents, wrongs, unjust enrichments, and "miscellaneous" other events. On this view, express trusts (like contracts, gifts, or estoppels) were consent based, some constructive trusts were too, while other constructive trusts produced rights (proprietary, or with priority in insolvency) for wrongs, and other constructive trusts and all resulting trusts were founded in unjust enrichment.

==== Constructive trusts ====
It is generally accepted that constructive trusts have been created for reasons, and so the more recent debate has therefore turned on which constructive trusts should be considered as arising to perfect a consent based obligation (like a contract), which ones arise in response to wrongdoing (like a tort) and which ones (if any) arise in response to unjust enrichment, or some other reasons. Consents, wrongs, unjust enrichments, and miscellaneous other reasons are usually seen as being at least three of the main categories of "event" that give rise to obligations in English law, and constructive trusts may straddle all of them.

==== Resulting trusts ====
Considerable disagreement exists about why resulting trusts arise, and also the circumstances in which they ought to, since it carries property rights rather than simply a personal remedy. The most prominent academic view is that resulting trust respond to unjust enrichment.

However, this analysis was rejected in the controversial speech of Lord Browne-Wilkinson in Westdeutsche Landesbank Girozentrale v Islington LBC. This case involved a claim by the Westdeutsche bank for its money back from Islington council with compound interest. The bank gave the council money under an interest rate swap agreement, but these agreements were found to be unlawful and ultra vires for councils to enter into by the House of Lords in 1992 in Hazell v Hammersmith and Fulham LBC partly because the transactions were speculative, and partly because councils were effectively exceeding their borrowing powers under the Local Government Act 1972.

There was no question about whether the bank could recover the principal sum of its money, now that these agreements were void, but at the time the courts did not have jurisdiction to award compound interest (rather than simple interest) unless a claimant showed they were making a claim for property that they owned. So, to get more interest back, the bank contended that when money was transferred under the ultra vires agreement, a resulting trust arose immediately in its favour, giving it a property right, and therefore a right to compound interest.

The minority of the House of Lords, Lord Goff of Chieveley and Lord Woolf, held that the bank should have no proprietary claim, but they should nevertheless be awarded compound interest. This view was actually endorsed 12 years later by the House of Lords in Sempra Metals Ltd v IRC so that the courts can award compound interest on debts that are purely personal claims.

However, the majority in Westdeutsche held that the bank was not entitled to compound interest at all, particularly because there was no resulting trust. Lord Browne-Wilkinson's reasoning was that only if a recipient's conscience were affected, could a resulting trust arise. It followed that because the council could not have known that its transactions were ultra vires until the 1992 decision in Hazell, its "conscience" could not be affected. Theoretically this was controversial because it was unnecessary to reject that resulting trusts respond to unjust enrichment in order to deny that a proprietary remedy should be given.

=== Maxims ===
Historically, a principal justification for the intervention of equity was the Latin legal maxim, ubi jus ibi remedium ("where there is a right there must be a remedy"). The law of equity, as developed by the Court of Chancery and later courts, has grown to encompass a number of equitable maxims, which are maxims that represent the general principles of equity.

== Express trusts ==
In an express trust, the settlor will transfer property to someone a trustee to use it, on trust, to the benefit of a beneficiary. Requirements of express trusts include: (i) a certain intention to create a trust, as opposed to, for example, a gift, bailment or agency relationship; (ii) certainty of terms of the trust, particularly regarding the property and beneficiaries; (iii) that a trust must ultimately be for people, and not for a purpose.

The historical trend of construction of trusts is to find a way to enforce them. If, however, the trust is construed as being for a charitable purpose, then public policy is to ensure it is always enforced. Charitable trusts are one of a number of specific trust types, which are regulated by the Charities Act 2011. Very detailed rules also exist for pension trusts, for instance under the Pensions Act 1995, particularly to set out the legal duties of pension trustees, and to require a minimum level of funding.

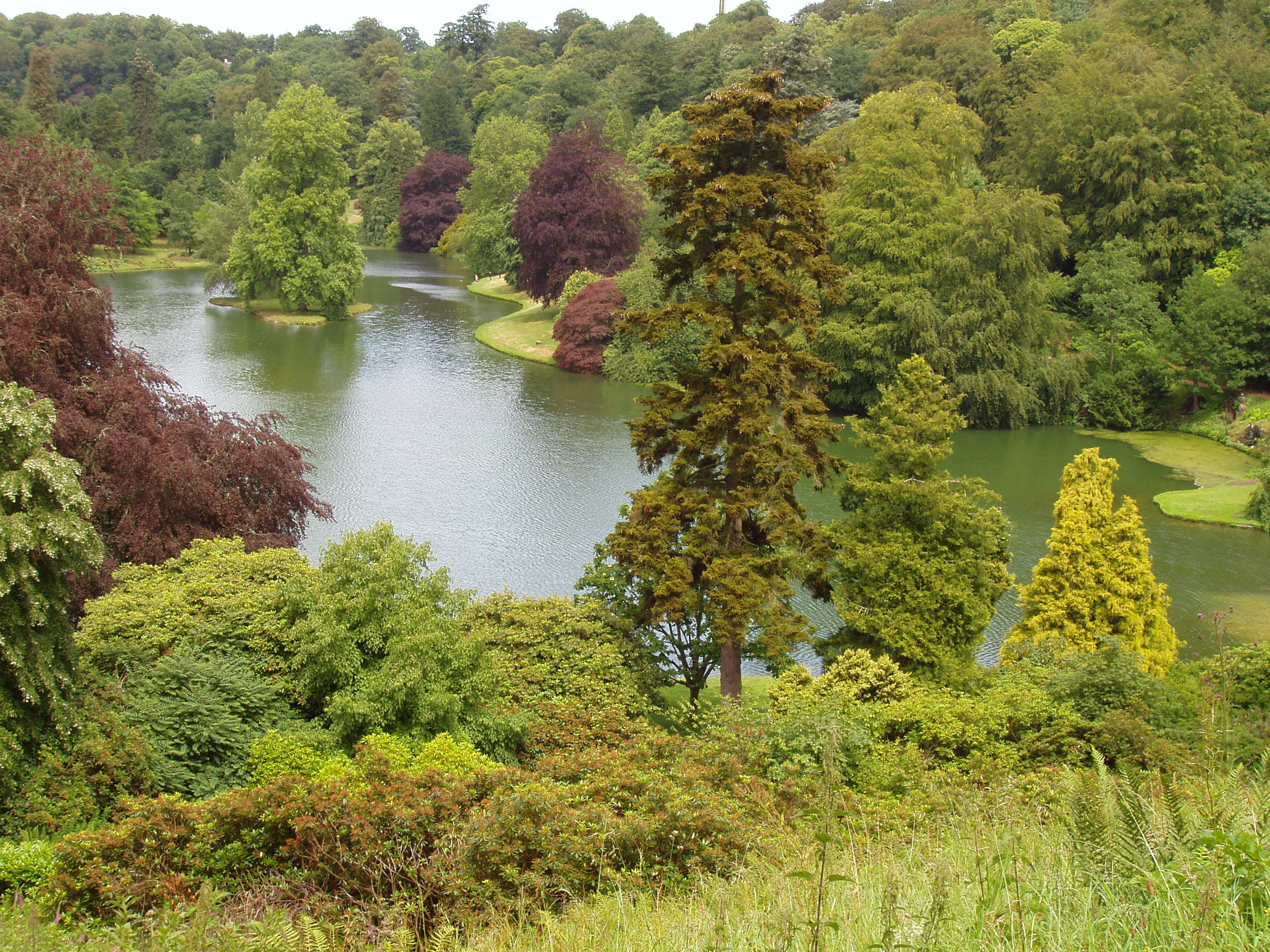
The National Trust, now a registered charity and endorsed by several Acts of Parliament, was established as a trust corporation in 1895, to hold property like Stourhead gardens (pictured) across the UK for the benefit of public recreation.

=== Intention ===
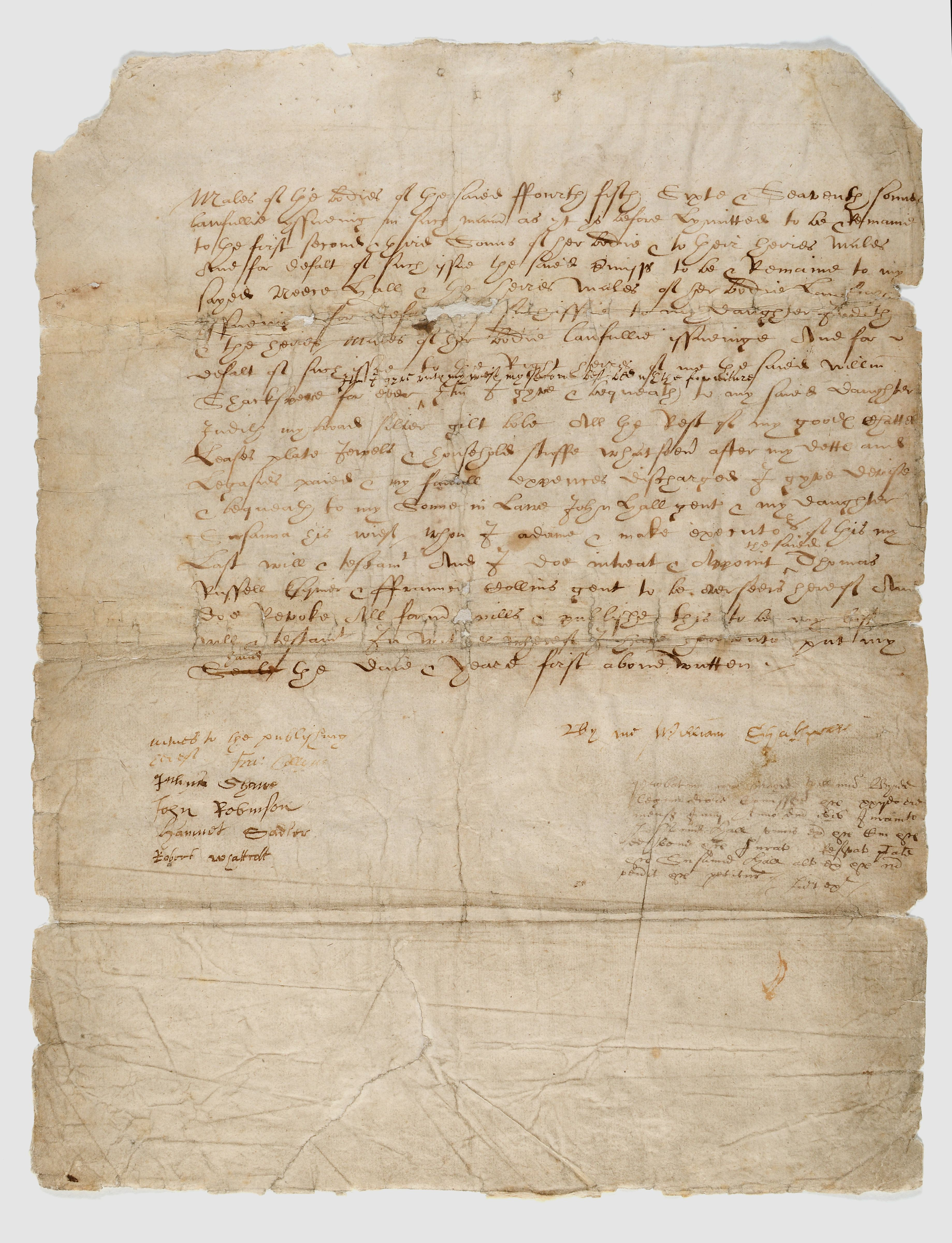
People's wills and testaments, like William Shakespeare's will here, often present difficulties in trust law where the meaning of what is intended is not completely clear. The House of Lords, however, has said a trust should only fail if its meaning is "utterly impossible" to deduce.

Express trusts are usually formed based on the expressed intentions of a person who owns some property to in future have it managed by a trustee, and used for another person's benefit. The general rule is that if someone "enters into arrangements which have the effect of creating a trust, it is not necessary that [she or] he should appreciate that they do so" (Lord Millett).

A settlor does not necessarily need to use the terminology of trusts to create an express trust. In Paul v Constance, Constance had recently split with his wife, and began to live with Paul. Because of their close relationship, Constance had often repeated to Paul that the money in his bank account was "as much yours as mine". When Constance died, his old wife claimed the money still belonged to her, but the Court of Appeal held that, despite the lack of formal wording, and though Mr Constance had retained the legal title to the money, it was held on trust for him and Ms Paul. They understood "very well indeed their own domestic situation", and even though legal terms were not used in substance this did "convey clearly a present declaration that the existing fund was as much" belonging to Ms Paul (Scarman LJ).

The only thing that needs to be done further is that, if the settlor is not declaring herself or himself as the trustee, the property should be effectively transferred to the new trustee for the trust to be properly "constituted". The traditional reason for requiring a transfer of property to the trustee was that the law demanded that property should be passed, and not just promised at some future date, unless something of value was given in return. The general trend in more recent cases, though is to be flexible in these requirements, because as Lord Browne-Wilkinson said, equity "will not strive officiously to defeat a gift".

=== Formality ===
Although trusts do not, generally, require any formality to be established, formality may be required in order to transfer property the settlor wishes to entrust. There are six particular situations: (1) transfers of company shares require registration, (2) express trusts of land generally require signed written evidence, while transfers of registered legal estates must be completed by registration, (3) transfers (or "dispositions") of an equitable interest require writing, (4) wills require writing and witnesses, (5) gifts that are only to be transferred in the future require deeds, and (6) bank cheques usually need to be endorsed with a signature.

The modern view of formal requirements is that their purpose is to ensure the transferring party has genuinely intended to carry out the transaction. As the American lawyer, Lon Fuller, put it the purpose is to provide "channels for the legally effective expression of intention", particularly where there's a common danger in large transactions that people could rush into it without thinking. However, older case law saw the courts interpreting the requirements of form very rigidly. In an 1862 case, Milroy v Lord, a man named Thomas Medley signed a deed for Samuel Lord to hold 50 Bank of Louisiana shares on trust for his niece, Eleanor Milroy. But the Court of Appeal in Chancery held that this did not create a trust (and nor was any gift effective) because the shares had not finally been registered.

Similarly, in an 1865 case, Jones v Lock, Lord Cranworth held that because a £900 cheque was not endorsed, it could not be counted as a gift for his son. This was so even though the father had said "I give this to baby... I am going to put it away for him... he may do what he likes with it" and locked it in a safe.

However, the more modern view, starting with Re Rose was that if the transferor had taken sufficient steps to demonstrate their intention for property to be entrusted, then this was enough. Here, Eric Rose had filled out forms to transfer company shares to his wife, and three months later this was entered into the company share register. The Court of Appeal held, however, that in equity the transfer took place when the donor had done everything necessary on his part to transfer the shares.

In Mascall v Mascall (1984) the Court of Appeal held that, when a father filled out a deed and certificate for the transfer of land, although the transfer had not actually been lodged with HM Land Registry, in equity the transfer was irrevocable. The trend was confirmed by the Privy Council in T Choithram International SA v Pagarani (2000), where a wealthy man publicly declared he would donate a large sum of money to a charitable foundation he had set up, but died before any transfer of the money took place.

Although a gift, which is not transferred, was traditionally thought to require a deed to be enforced, the Privy Council advised this was not necessary as the property was already vested in him as a trustee, and his intentions were clear. In the case of "secret trusts", where someone has written a will but also privately told the executor that they wished to donate their some part of their property in other ways, this has long been held to not contravene the Wills Act 1837 requirements for writing. The modern trend, then, has been that so long as the purpose of the formality rules will not be undermined, the courts will not hold trusts invalid.

=== Certainty of subject and beneficiaries ===
Beyond the requirement for a settlor to have truly intended to create a trust, it has been said since at least 1832 that the subject matter of the property, and the people who are to benefit must also be certain. Together, certainty of intention, the certainty of subject matter and beneficiaries have been called the "three certainties" required to form a trust, although the purposes of each "certainty" are different in kind.

While certainty of intention (and the formality rules) seek to ensure that the settlor truly intended to benefit another person with his or her property, the requirements of certain subject matter and beneficiaries focus on whether a court will have a reasonable ability to know on what terms the trust should be enforced. As a point of general principle, most courts do not strive to defeat trusts on the basis of uncertainty.

In the case of In re Roberts a lady named Miss Roberts wrote in her will that she wanted to leave £8753 and 5 shillings worth of bank annuities to her brother and his children who had the surname of "Roberts-Gawen". Miss Roberts' brother had a daughter who changed her name on marriage, but her son later changed his name back to Roberts-Gawen. At first instance, Hall VC held that, because the grand-nephew's mother had changed the name it was too uncertain that Miss Roberts had wished him to benefit. But on appeal, Lord Jessel MR held that

the modern doctrine is not to hold a will void for uncertainty unless it is utterly impossible to put a meaning upon it. The duty of the Court is to put a fair meaning on the terms used, and not, as was said in one case, to repose on the easy pillow of saying that the whole is void for uncertainty.

Although in the 19th century a number of courts were overly tentative, the modern trend, much like in the law of contract, became as Lord Denning put it: that "in cases of contract, as of wills, the courts do not hold the terms void for uncertainty unless it is utterly impossible to put a meaning upon them." For example, in the High Court case of Re Golay's Will Trusts, Ungoed-Thomas J held that a will stipulating that a "reasonable income" should be paid to the beneficiaries, although the amount was not anywhere specified, could be given a clear meaning and enforced by the court. Courts were, he said, "constantly involved in making such objective assessments of what is reasonable" and would ensure "the direction in the will is not ... defeated by uncertainty."

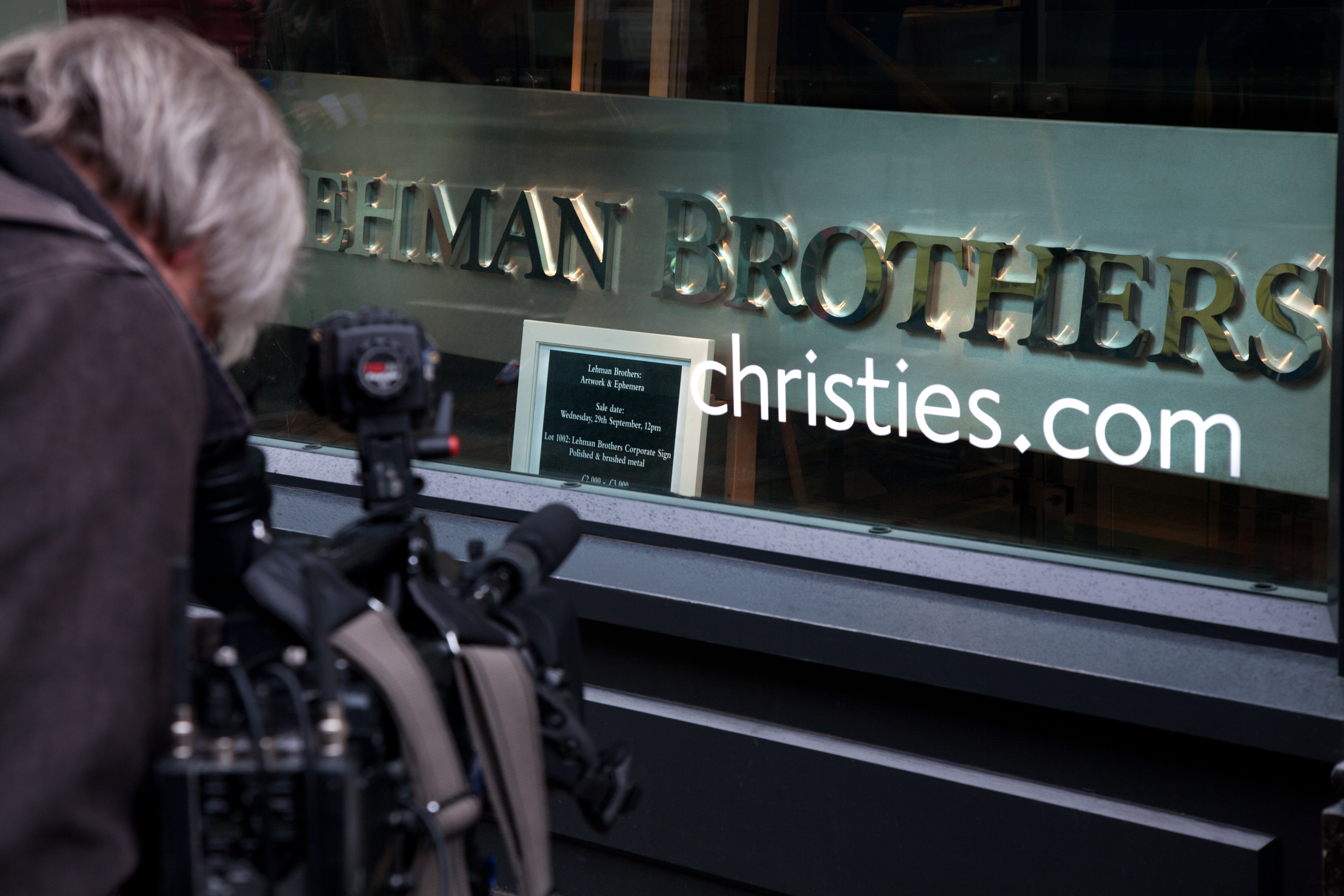
During the 2008 financial crisis the insolvency of Lehman Brothers, whose sign was auctioned here at Christie's, led to a mass of litigation to sort out which bank investors might have sufficiently certain equitable rights in the financial assets, or who would be the unlucky unsecured creditors.

However, the courts have had difficulty in defining appropriate principles for cases where trusts are declared over property that many people have an interest in. This is especially true where the person who possesses that property has gone insolvent. In Re Kayford Ltd a mail order business went insolvent and customers who had paid for goods wanted their money back. Megarry J held that because Kayford Ltd had put its money in a separate account the money was held on trust, and so the customers were not unsecured creditors. By contrast, in Re London Wine Co (Shippers) Ltd., Oliver J held that customers who had bought wine bottles were not entitled to take their wine because no particular bottles had been identified for a trust to arise. A similar view was expressed by the Privy Council in Re Goldcorp Exchange Ltd, where the customers of an insolvent gold bullion reserve business were told that they never had been given particular gold bars, and so were unsecured creditors. These decisions were said to be motivated by the desire to not undermine the statutory priority system in insolvency, although it is not entirely clear why those policy reasons extended to consumers who are usually seen as "non-adjusting" creditors. However, in the leading Court of Appeal decision, Hunter v Moss, there was no insolvency issue. There, Moss had declared himself to be a trustee of 50 out of 950 shares he held in a company, and Hunter sought to enforce this declaration. Dillon LJ held that it did not matter that the 50 particular shares had not been identified or isolated, and they were held on trust.

The same result was reached, however, in an insolvency decision by Neuberger J in the High Court, called Re Harvard Securities Ltd, where clients of a brokerage company were held to have had an equitable property interest in share capital held for them as a nominee. The view that appears to have been adopted is that if assets are "fungible" (i.e. swapping them with other will not make much difference) a declaration of trust can be made, so long as the purpose of the statutory priority rules in insolvency are not compromised.

The final "certainty" the courts require is to know to some reasonable degree who the beneficiaries are to be.

In Re Gulbenkian's Settlements (1970) a wealthy Ottoman oil businessman and co-founder of the Iraq Petroleum Company, Calouste Gulbenkian, had left a settlement giving his trustees "absolute discretion" to pay money to his son Nubar Gulbenkian, and family, but then also anyone with whom Nubar had "from time to time [been] employed or residing". This provision of the will was challenged (by the other potential beneficiaries, who wanted more themselves) as being too uncertain in regard to who the beneficiaries were meant to be. The House of Lords held that the will was still entirely valid, because even though one might not be able to draw up a definite list of everybody, the trustees and a court could be sufficiently certain, with evidence of anyone who "did or did not" employ or house Nubar.

Similarly, this "is or is not test" was applied in McPhail v Doulton. Mr Betram Baden created a trust for the employees, relatives and dependants of his company, but also giving the trustees "absolute discretion" to determine who this was. The settlement was challenged on the ground that the idea of "relatives" and "dependants" was too uncertain. The House of Lords adopted the “is or is not” test for certainty of objects, holding that, "to give effect to the settlor's or testator's intentions", a complete list of beneficiaries was not required. When the case was remitted to the lower courts to determine what in fact the settlor's intentions were, in Re Baden's Deed Trusts, the judges in the Court of Appeal could not agree. All agreed the trust was sufficiently certain, but Sachs LJ thought it was only necessary to show that there was a "conceptually certain" class of beneficiaries, however small, and Megaw LJ thought a class of beneficiaries had to have "at least a substantial number of objects", while Stamp LJ believed that the court should restrict the definition of "relative" or "dependant" to something clear, such as "next of kin".

The Court of Appeal in Re Tuck's Settlement Trusts was more clear. An art publisher who had Jewish background, Baronet Adolph Tuck, wished to create a trust for people who were "of Jewish blood". Because of mixing of faiths and ancestors over generations, this could have meant a very large number of people, but in the view of Lord Denning MR the trustees could simply decide. Also the will had stated that the Chief Rabbi of London could resolve any doubts, and so it was valid for a second reason. Lord Russell agreed, although on this point Eveleigh LJ dissented, and stated that the trust was only valid with Rabbi clause. Divergent views in some cases continued.

In Re Barlow's Will Trusts, Browne-Wilkinson J held that concepts (like "friend") could always be restricted, as a last resort, to prevent a trust failing. By contrast in one highly political case, a High Court judge found that the West Yorkshire County Council's plan to make a discretionary trust to distribute £400,000 "for the benefit of any or all of the inhabitants" of West Yorkshire, with the aim to inform people about the effects of the council's impending abolition by Margaret Thatcher's government, failed because it was (apparently) "unworkable". It remained unclear whether some courts' attachment to strict certainty requirements was consistent with the principles of equitable flexibility.

=== Disposal ===
If all beneficiaries are in agreement and of full age they may decide how to use the property themselves.

== Purpose trusts ==
=== Beneficiary principle ===
People have a general freedom, subject to statutory requirements and basic fiduciary duties, to design the terms of a trust in the way a settlor deems fit. However English courts have long refused to enforce trusts that only serve an abstract purpose, and are not for the benefit of people.

Only charitable trusts, defined by the Charities Act 2011, and about four other exceptions will be enforced. The main reason for this judicial policy is to prevent, as Roxburgh J said in Re Astor's Settlement Trusts, "the creation of large funds devoted to non-charitable purposes which no court and no department of state can control". This followed a similar policy to the rule against perpetuities, which rendered void any trust that would only be transferred to (or "vest") in someone in the distant future (currently 125 years under the Perpetuities and Accumulations Act 2009). In both ways, the view has remained strong that the wishes of the dead should not, so to speak, rule the living from the grave.

Re Astor's ST itself concerned the wish of the Viscount Waldorf Astor, who had owned The Observer newspaper, to maintain "good understanding... between nations" and "the independence and integrity of newspapers". The trust was not within the tightly defined categories of a charity, and so was not valid. In Brown v Burdett, old lady stated in her will that her house should be boarded up for 20 years with "good long nails to be bent down on the inside", but for some reason with her clock remaining inside. Bacon VC cancelled the trust altogether.

But while there is a policy against enforcing trusts for abstract and non-charitable purposes, if possible the courts will construe a trust as being for people where they can. For example, in Re Bowes an aristocrat named John Bowes left £5,000 in his will for "planting trees for shelter on the Wemmergill estate", in County Durham. This was an extravagantly large sum of money for trees. But rather than holding it void (since planting trees on private land was a non-charitable purpose) North J construed the trust to mean that the money was really intended for the estate owners. Similarly in Re Osoba, the Court of Appeal held that a trust of a Nigerian man, Patrick Osoba, said to be for the purpose of "training of my daughter" was not an invalid purpose trust. Instead it was in substance intended that the money be for the daughter. Buckley LJ said the court would treat "the reference to the purpose as merely a statement of the testator's motive in making the gift".

==== Exceptions ====
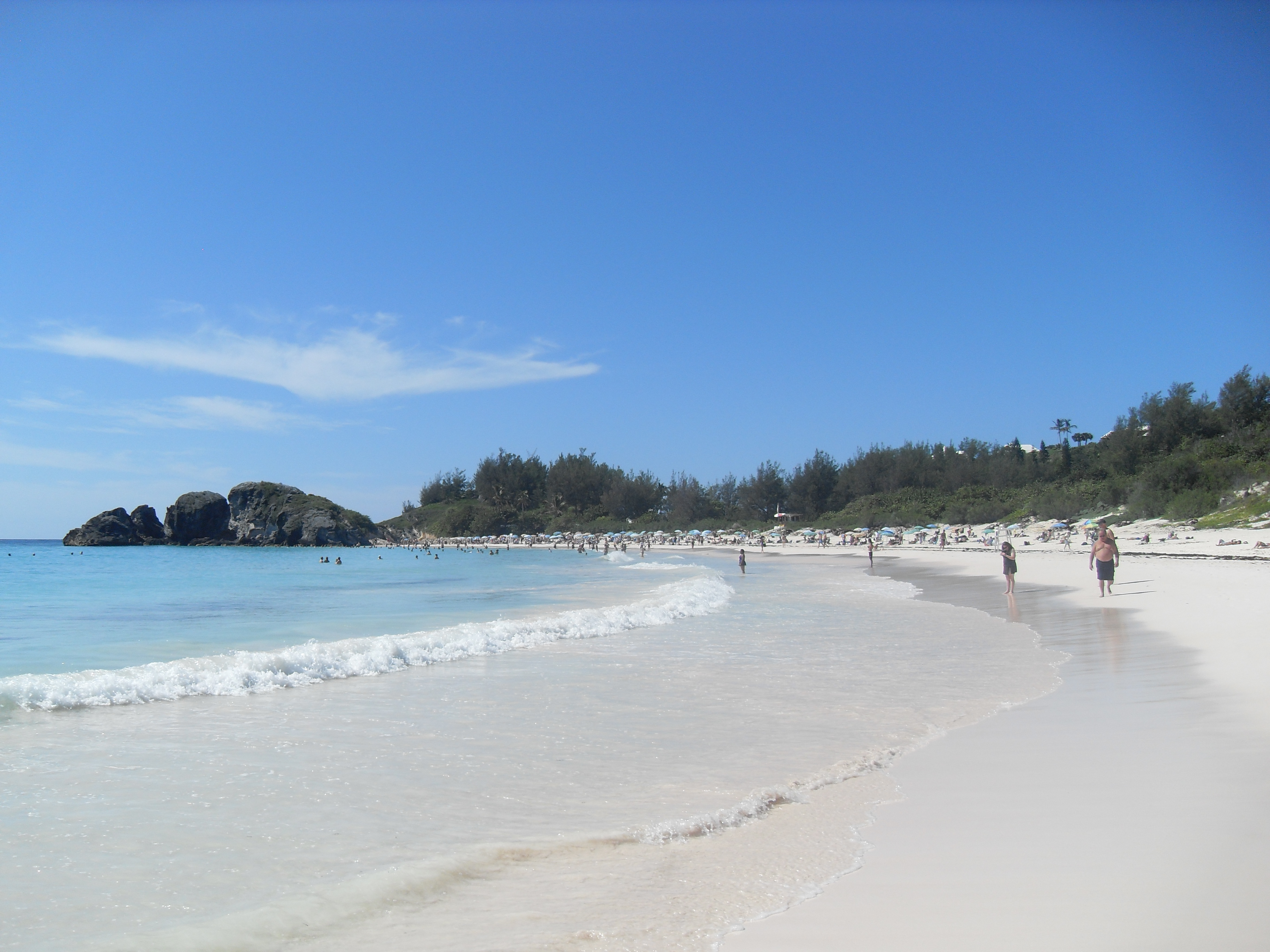
Under the Hague Trust Convention, ratified by the Recognition of Trusts Act 1987, UK law voluntarily recognises almost all trusts created overseas, in tax havens such as Bermuda, even if there are lower standards for transparency, use of assets, no requirement of beneficiaries, or nominal tax.

There are commonly said to be three (or maybe four) small exceptions to the rule against enforcing non-charitable purpose trusts, and there is one certain and major loophole. First, trusts can be created for building and maintaining graves and funeral monuments. Second, trusts have been allowed for the saying of private masses. Third, it was (long before the Hunting Act 2004) said to be lawful to have a trust promoting fox hunting.

These "exceptions" were said to be fixed in Re Endacott, where a minor businessman in who lived in Devon wanted to entrust money "for the purpose of providing some useful memorial to myself". Lord Evershed MR held this invalid because it was not a grave, let alone charitable. It has, however, been questioned whether the existing categories are in fact true exceptions given that graves and masses could be construed as trusts which ultimately benefit the landowner, or the relevant church.

In any case the major exception to the no purpose trust rule is that in many other common law countries, particularly the United States and a number of Caribbean states, they can be valid. If capital is entrusted under the rules of other jurisdictions the Recognition of Trusts Act 1987 Schedule 1, articles 6 and 18 requires that the trusts are recognised. This follows the Hague Trust Convention of 1985, which was ratified by 12 countries.

The UK will generally recognise an offshore trust, with certain exceptions, such as where they are "manifestly incompatible with public policy". Courts will, as such, often recognise purpose trusts, which are created to serve no charitable function, in offshore financial centres or tax havens such as Jersey, the Isle of Man, Bermuda, the British Virgin Islands and the Cayman Islands.

=== Associations ===
While express trusts in a family, charity, pension or investment context are typically created with the intention of benefiting people, property held by associations, particularly those which are not incorporated, was historically problematic. Often associations did not express their property to be held in any particular way and courts had theorised that it was held on trust for the members.

At common law, associations such as trade unions, political parties, or local sports clubs were formed through an express or implicit contract, so long as "two or more persons [are] bound together for one or more common purposes". In Leahy v Attorney-General for New South Wales Viscount Simonds in the Privy Council, advised that if property is transferred, for example by gift, to an unincorporated association it is "nothing else than a gift to its members at the date of the gift as joint tenants or tenants in common." He said that if property were deemed to be held on trust for future members, this could be void for violating the rule against perpetuities, because an association could last long into the future, and so the courts would generally deem current members to be the appropriate beneficiaries who would take the property on trust for one another.

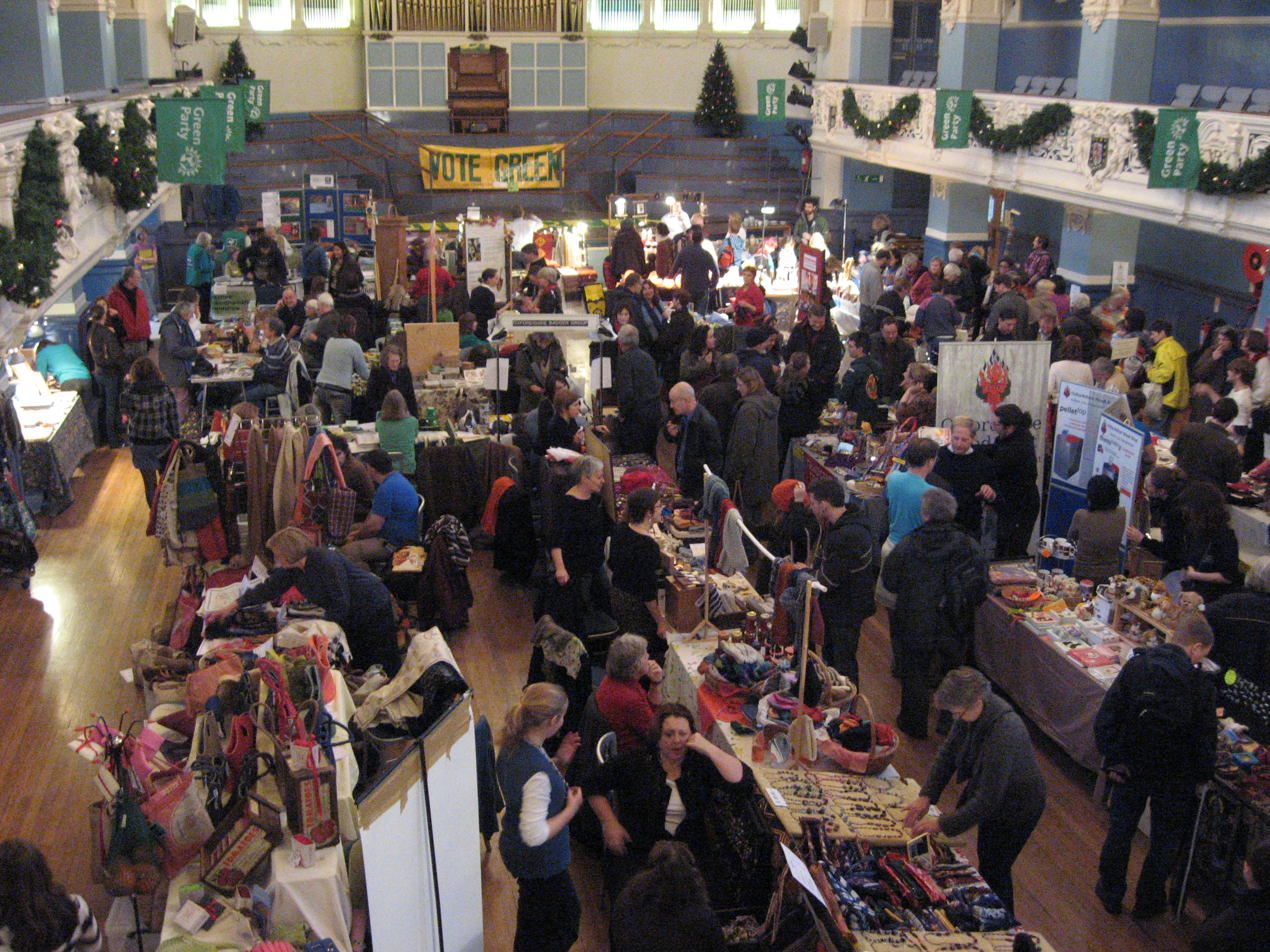
Political parties, like the Greens, are typically thought to hold property according to the terms of the contract of association. Property is held on trust by the treasurer for the members as a whole.

Another way of thinking about associations' property, that came to be the dominant and practical view, was first stated by Brightman J in Re Recher's Will Trusts. Here it was said that, if no words are used that indicate a trust is intended, a "gift takes effect in favour of the existing members of the association as an accretion to the funds which are the subject-matter of the contract". In other words, property will be held according to the members' contractual terms of their association. This matters for deciding whether a gift will succeed or be held to fail, although that possibility is unlikely on any contemporary view. It also matters where an association is being wound up, and there is a dispute over who should take the remaining property.

In a Hanchett‐Stamford v Attorney‐General Lewison J held that the final surviving member of the "Performing and Captive Animals Defence League" was entitled to the remaining property of the association, although while the association was running any money could not be used for the members' private purposes.

On the other hand, if money is donated to an organisation, and specifically intended to be passed onto others, then the end of an association could mean that remaining assets will go back to the people the money came from (on "resulting trust") or be bona vacantia. In Re West Sussex Constabulary's Widows, Children and Benevolent (1930) Fund Trusts, Goff J held that a fund set up for the dependants of police staff, which was being wound up, which had been given money expressly for reason of benefiting dependants (and not to benefit the members of the trust) could not be taken by those members. The rules have also mattered, however for the purpose of taxation. In Conservative and Unionist Central Office v Burrell it was held that the Conservative Party, and its various limbs and branches, was not all bound together by a contract, and so not subject to corporation tax.

=== Charitable trusts ===
Charitable trusts are a general exception to the rule in English law that express trusts must be created for people and not purposes. The meaning of a charity has been set in statute since the Elizabethan Charitable Uses Act 1601, but the principles are now codified by the Charities Act 2011. Apart from being capable of not having any clear beneficiaries, charitable trusts can enjoy exemption from taxation on its own capital or income, and people making gifts can deduct the gift from their taxes, depending on the circumstances.

The CA 2011 section 3, section 4 emphasises that all purposes must be for the "public benefit". The meaning of this is determined by the courts. In Oppenheim v Tobacco Securities Trust the House of Lords held that an employer's trust for his employees and children was not for the public benefit because of the personal relationship between them. Generally, the trust must be for a "sufficient section of the public" and cannot exclude the poor.

Because beneficiaries can rarely enforce charitable trustee standards, the Charities Commission is a statutory body whose role is to promote good practice and pre-empt poor charitable management.

== Imposed trusts ==
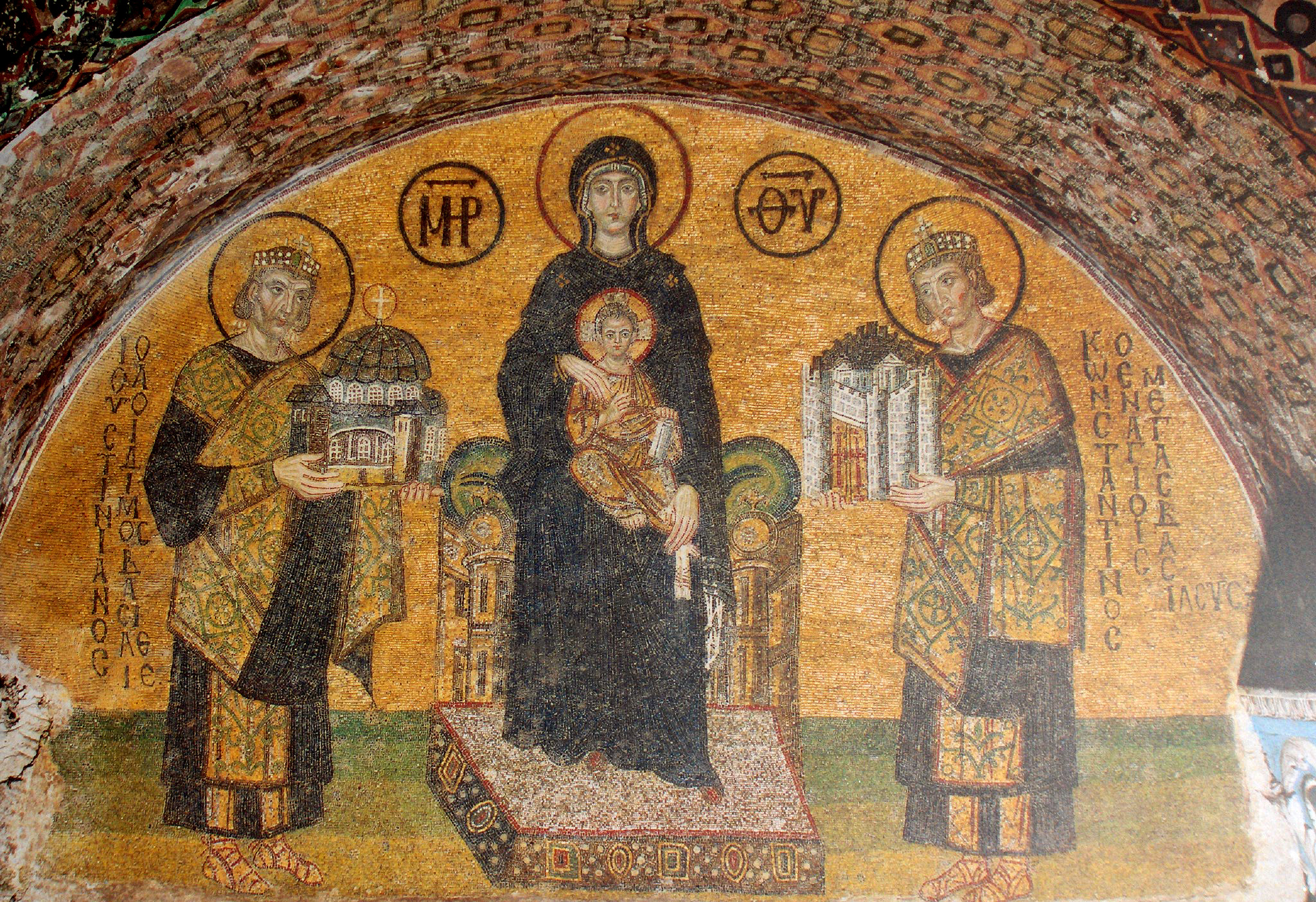
The Corpus Juris Civilis (534 AD) of Justinian I (depicted left) followed Gaius' Institutes (170 AD) by categorising the law of obligations into contracts, delicts, and "miscellaneous" others. Unjust enrichment was slowly seen as a third category, but it is controversial whether proprietary rights arise to reverse it. Resulting trusts and some constructive trusts are usually conceptualised as responding to unjust enrichment.

While express trusts arise primarily because of a conscious plan that settlors, trustees or beneficiaries consent to, courts also impose trusts to correct wrongs and reverse unjust enrichment. The two main types of imposed trusts are resulting and constructive trusts.

There is significant academic debate over why they arise. Traditionally, the explanation was this was to prevent people acting "unconscionably" (i.e. inequitably or unjustly). Modern authors increasingly prefer to categorise resulting and constructive trusts more precisely, as responding to wrongs, unjust enrichments, sometimes consent or contributions in family home cases.

Having a property right is usually most important if a defendant is insolvent, because then the "beneficiaries" under resulting or constructive rank in priority to the defendants' other creditors: they can take the property away first.

Generally, resulting trusts are imposed by courts when a person receives property, but the person who transferred it did not have the intention for them to benefit. English law establishes a presumption that people do not desire to give away property unless there is some objective manifestation of consent to do so.

Constructive trusts arise in around ten different circumstances. Though the list is debated, potentially the courts will "construe" a person to hold property for another person, first, to complete a consent based obligations, particularly those lacking formality, second, to reflect a person's contribution to the value of property, especially in a family home, third, to effect a remedy for wrongdoing such as when a trustee makes a secret profit, and fourth, to reverse unjust enrichment.

=== Resulting trusts ===
A resulting trust is usually recognised when one person has given property to another person without the intention to benefit them. The recipient will be declared by the court to be a "resulting trustee" so that the equitable property right returns to the person it came from. For some time, the courts of equity required proof of a positive intention before they would acknowledge the passing of a gift, primarily as a way to prevent fraud.

If one person transferred property to another, unless there was positive evidence that it was meant to be a gift, it would be presumed that the recipient held the property on trust for the transferor. It was also recognised that if money was transferred as part of the purchase of land or a house, the transferor would acquire an equitable interest in the land under a resulting trust. On the other hand, if evidence clearly showed a gift was intended, then a gift would be acknowledged.

If there is no evidence either way of intention to benefit someone with a property transfer, the presumption of a resulting trust is not absolute. The Law of Property Act 1925 section 60(3) states that a resulting trust does not arise simply with absence of an express intention. However, the presumption is strong. This has a consequence when property is transferred in connection with an illegal purpose.

==== Illegality ====
Ordinarily, English law takes the view that one cannot rely in civil claims on actions done that are tainted with illegality (or in the Latin saying ex turpi causa non oritur actio). However, in Tinsley v Milligan, it was still possible for a claimant, Ms Milligan, to show she had an equitable interest in the house where she and her partner, Ms Tinsley, lived because she had contributed to the purchase price. Ms Tinsley was the sole registered owner, and both had intended to keep things this way because with one person on the title, they could fraudulently claim more in social security benefits. The House of Lords held, however, that because a resulting trust was presumed by the law, Ms Milligan did not need to prove an intention to not benefit Ms Tinsley, and therefore rely on her intention that was tainted with an illegal purpose.

==== Advancement ====
By contrast, the law has historically stated that when a husband transfers property to his wife (but not vice versa) or when parents make transfers to their children, a gift is presumed (or there is a "presumption of advancement"). This presumption has been criticised on the ground that it is essentially sexist, or at least "belonging to the propertied classes of a different social era." It could be thought to follow that if Milligan had been a man and married to Tinsley, then the case's outcome would be the opposite.

One limitation, however, came in Tribe v Tribe. Here a father transferred company shares to his son with a view to putting them out of reach of his creditors. This created a presumption of advancement. His son then refused to give the shares back, and the father argued in court that he had plainly not intended the son should benefit. Millett LJ held that because the illegal plan (to defraud creditors) had not been put into effect, the father could prove he had not intended to benefit his son by referring to the plan. Depending on what an appellate court would now decide, the presumption of advancement may remain a part of the law. The Equality Act 2010 section 199 would abolish the presumption of advancement, but the section's implementation was delayed indefinitely by the Conservative led coalition government when it was elected in 2010.

==== Automatic resulting trusts ====
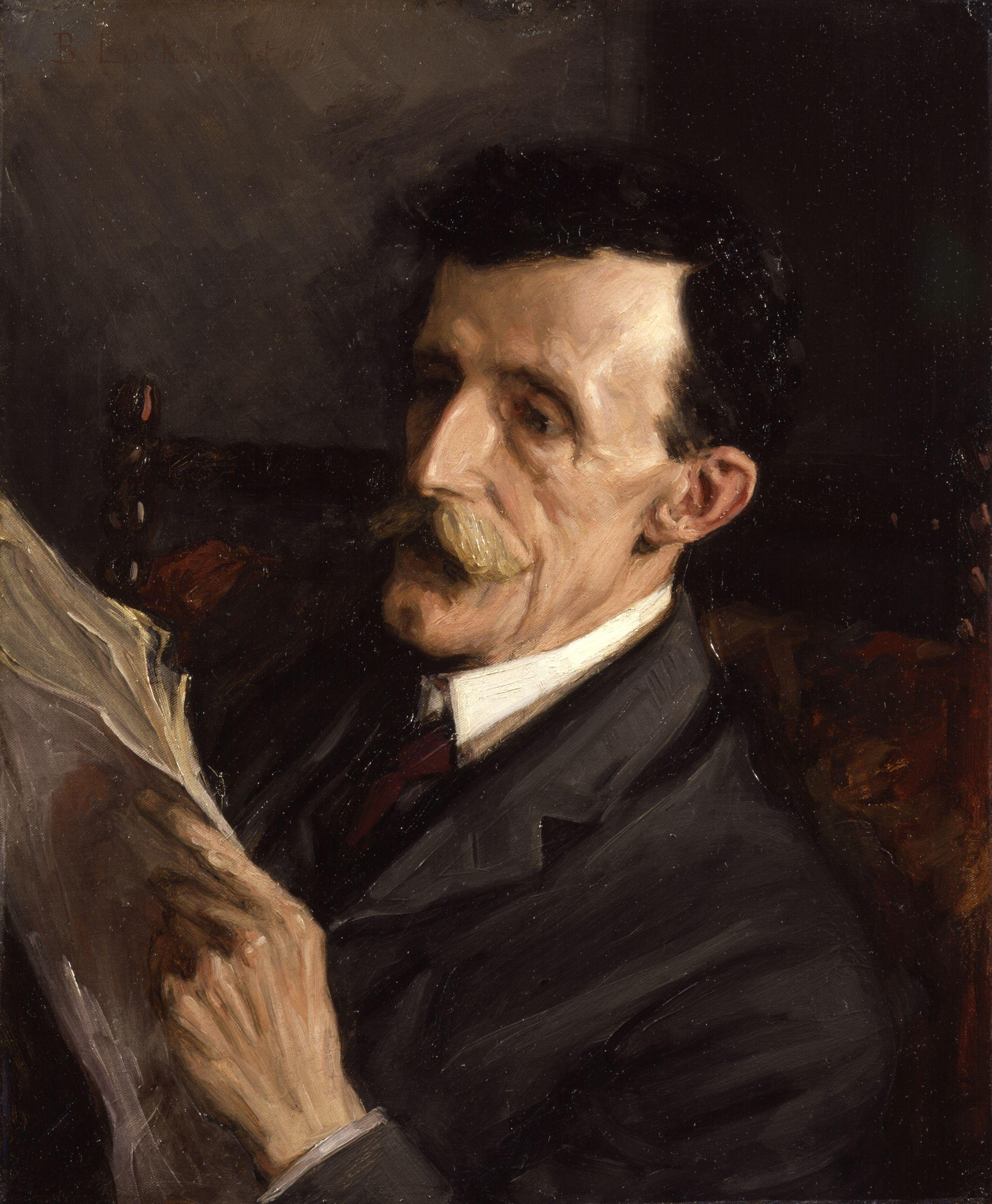
In 1910 Frederic Maitland, in his famous lectures on Equity, described resulting trusts as follows: "I have made a trustee for somebody, and a trustee he must be – if for no one else then for me or my representatives". It remains controversial whether they respond to unjust enrichment, or what would have been intended by the parties.

As well as resulting trusts, where the courts have presumed that the transferor would have intended the property return, there are resulting trusts which arise by automatic operation of the law. A key example is where property is transferred to a trustee, but too much is handed over. The surplus will be held by the recipient on a resulting trust.

For example, in the Privy Council case of Air Jamaica Ltd v Charlton an airline's pension plan was overfunded, so that all employees could be paid the benefits that they were due under their employment contracts, but a surplus remained. The company argued that it should receive the money, because it had attempted to amend the scheme's terms, and the Jamaican government argued that it should receive the money, as bona vacantia because the scheme's original terms had stated money was not to return to the company, and the employees had all received their entitlements. However, the Privy Council advised both were wrong and the money should return to those who had made contributions to the fund: half the company and half the employees, on resulting trust. This was in response, according to Lord Millett, "to the absence of any intention on his part to pass a beneficial interest to the recipient."

In a similar pattern, it was held in Vandervell v Inland Revenue Commissioners that an option to repurchase shares in a company was held on resulting trust for Mr Vandervell when he declared the option to be held by his family trustees, but did not say who he meant the option to be held on trust for. Mr Vandervell had been trying to make a gift of £250,000 to the Royal College of Surgeons without paying any transfer tax, and thought that he could do it if he transferred the College some shares in his company, let the company pay out enough dividends, and then bought the shares back. However, the Income Tax Act 1952 section 415(2), applied a tax to a settlor of a trust for any income made out of trusts, if the settlor retained any interest whatsoever. Because Mr Vandervell did not say who the option was meant to be for, the House of Lords concluded the option was held on trust for him, and therefore he was taxed. It has also been said, that trusts which arise when one person gives property to another for a reason, but then the reason fails, as in Barclays Bank Ltd v Quistclose Investments Ltd are resulting in nature.

However, Lord Millett in his judgement in Twinsectra Ltd v Yardley,(dissenting on the knowing receipt point, leading on the Quistclose point) recategorised the trust which arises as an immediate express trust for the benefit of the transferor, albeit with a mandate upon the recipient to apply the assets for a purpose stated in the contract.

=== Constructive trusts ===
At least since 1677, constructive trusts have been recognised in English courts in about seven to twelve circumstances (depending on how the counting and categorisation is done). Because constructive trusts were developed by the Court of Chancery, it was historically said that a trust was "construed" or imposed by the court on someone who acquired property, whenever good conscience required it.

In the US case, Beatty v Guggenheim Exploration Co, Cardozo J remarked that the "constructive trust is the formula through which the conscience of equity finds expression. When property has been acquired in such circumstances that the holder of the legal title may not in good conscience retain the beneficial interest, equity converts him into a trustee." However, this did not say what underlay the seemingly different situations where constructive trusts were found. In Canada, the Supreme Court at one point held that all constructive trusts responded to someone being "unjustly enriched" by coming to hold another person's property, but it later changed its mind, given that property could come to be held when it was unfair to keep through other means, particularly a wrong or through an incomplete consensual obligation.

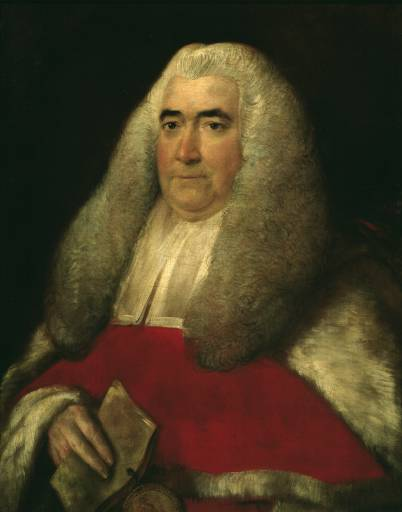
In his Commentaries (1765) William Blackstone argued all causes of actions were founded on wrongs to protect rights. Constructive trusts, however, are usually argued to arise to perfect consent based obligations, to provide a proprietary remedy for wrongdoing, to reverse unjust enrichment, and to reflect the contributions of work that people make, especially in family homes.

The constructive trusts that are usually seen as responding to consent (for instance, like a commercial contract), or "intention" are, first, agreements to convey property where all the formalities have not yet been completed. If an agreement could be specifically enforced, before formalities are completed the agreement to transfer a property is regarded as effective in equity, and the property may be held on trust (unless this is expressly excluded by the agreement's terms).

Second, when someone agrees to use property for another's benefit, or divide a property after purchase, but then goes back on the agreement, the courts will impose a constructive trust. In Binions v Evans when Mr and Mrs Binions bought a large property they promised the sellers that Mrs Evans could remain for life in her cottage. They subsequently tried to evict Mrs Evans, but Lord Denning MR held that their agreement had created a constructive trust, and so the property was not theirs to deal with.

Third, gifts or trusts that are made without completing all formalities will be enforced under a constructive trust if it is clear that the person making the gift or trust manifested a true intention to do so. In the leading case, Pennington v Waine a lady named Ada Crampton had wished to transfer 400 shares to her nephew, Harold, had filled in a share transfer form and given it to Mr Pennington, the company's auditors, and had died before Mr Pennington had registered it. Ada's other family members claimed the shares still belonged to them, but the Court of Appeal held that even though not formally complete, the estate held the shares on constructive trust for Harold. Similarly, in T Choithram International SA v Pagarani the Privy Council held that Mr Pagarani's estate held money on constructive trust after he died for a new foundation, even though Mr Pagarani had not completed the trust deeds, because he had publicly announced his intention to hold the money on trust.

Fourth, if a person who is about to die secretly declares that he wishes property to go to someone not named in a will, the executor holds that property on constructive trust.

Similarly, fifth, if a person writes a "mutual will" with their partner, agreeing that their property will go to a particular beneficiary when they both die, the surviving person cannot simply change their mind and will hold the property on constructive trust for the party who was agreed. It is more controversial whether "constructive trusts" in the family home respond to consent or intention, or really respond to contributions to property, which are usually found in the "miscellaneous" category of events that generate obligations.

In a sixth situation, constructive trusts have been acknowledged to arise since the late 1960s, where two people are living together in a family home, but are not married, and both are making financial or other contributions to the house, but only one is registered on the legal title. The law had settled in Lloyds Bank plc v Rosset as requiring saying that (1) if an agreement had been made for both to share in the property, then a constructive trust would be imposed in favour of the person who was not registered, or (2) they had nevertheless made direct contributions to the purchase of the home or mortgage repayments, then they would have a share of the property under a constructive trust. However, in Stack v Dowden, and then Jones v Kernott the Law Lords held by a majority that Rosset probably no longer represented the law (if it ever did) and that a "common intention" to share in the property could be inferred from a wide array of circumstances (including potentially simply having children together), and also perhaps "imputed" without any evidence. However, if a constructive trust, and a property right binding third parties, arises in this situation based on imputed intentions, or simply on the basis that it was fair, it would mean that constructive trusts did not merely respond to consent, but also to the fact of valuable contributions being made. There remains significant debate both about the proper manner of characterising constructive trusts in this field, and also about how far the case law should match the statutory regime that applies for married couples under the Matrimonial Causes Act 1973.

Situations where constructive trusts arise

1. Specifically enforceable agreements, before transfer completed
2. Undertakings by purchasers to use property for another's benefit
3. Clearly intended gifts or trusts, short of formality
4. "Secret" trusts declared before a will
5. Mutual wills
6. Contributions to the family home, through money or work
7. On proceeds of crime
8. For information acquired in breach of confidence
9. On profits made by a fiduciary acting in breach of duty
10. In some cases where a recipient of property is unjustly enriched

In a seventh group of constructive trust cases, a person who murders their wife or husband cannot inherit their property, and are said by the courts to hold any property on constructive trust for another next of kin.

Eighth, it was held in Attorney General v Guardian Newspapers Ltd that information, or intellectual property, taken in breach of confidence would be held on constructive trust.

Ninth, a trustee or another person in a fiduciary position, who breaches a duty and makes a profit out of it, has been held to hold all profits on constructive trust. For instance in Boardman v Phipps, a solicitor for a family trust and one of the trust's beneficiaries, took the opportunity to invest in a company in Australia, partly on the trust's behalf, but also making a profit themselves. They both stood in a "fiduciary" position of trust because as a solicitor, or someone managing the trust's affairs, the law requires they act solely in the trust's interest. Crucially, they failed to gain the fully informed consent of the beneficiaries to invest in the opportunity and make a profit themselves. This opened up a possibility that their interests could conflict with the interests of the trust. So, the House of Lords held they were in breach of duty, and that all profits they made were held on constructive trust, though they could claim quantum meruit (a salary fixed by the court) for the work they did.

More straightforwardly, in Reading v Attorney-General the House of Lords held that an army sergeant (a fiduciary for the UK government) who took bribes while stationed in Egypt held his bribes on constructive trust for the Crown. However, more recently it has become more controversial to classify these constructive trusts along with wrongs on the basis that the remedies that are available should differ from (and usually go further than) compensatory damages in tort.

Also, it has been doubted that a constructive trust should be imposed that would bind third parties in an insolvency situation. In Sinclair Investments (UK) Ltd v Versailles Trade Finance Ltd, Lord Neuberger MR held that company's liquidators could not claim a proprietary interest in the fraudulent profits its former director had made if this would prejudice the director's other creditors in insolvency. The effect of a constructive trust would accordingly be limited so that it did not bind third party creditors of an insolvent defendant.

The United Kingdom Supreme Court, however, has subsequently overruled Sinclair in FHR European Ventures LLP v Cedar Capital Partners LLC, holding that a bribe or secret commission accepted by an agent is held on trust for his principal..

Unjust enrichment is seen to underlie a final group of constructive trust cases, although this remains controversial. In Chase Manhattan Bank NA v Israel-British Bank (London) Ltd Goulding J held that a bank that mistakenly paid money to another bank had a claim to the money back under a constructive trust. Mistake would typically be seen as an unjust enrichment claim today, and there is no debate over whether the money could be claimed back in principle. It was, however, questioned whether the claim for the money back should be proprietary in nature, and so whether a constructive trust should arise, particularly if this would bind third parties (for instance, if the recipient bank had gone insolvent). In Westdeutsche Landesbank Girozentrale v Islington LBC Lord Browne-Wilkinson held that a constructive trust could only arise if the recipient's conscience would have been affected at the time of the receipt or before any third party's rights had intervened. In this way, it is controversial whether unjust enrichment underlies any constructive trusts at all, although it remains unclear why someone's conscience being affected should make any difference.

== Trust operation ==
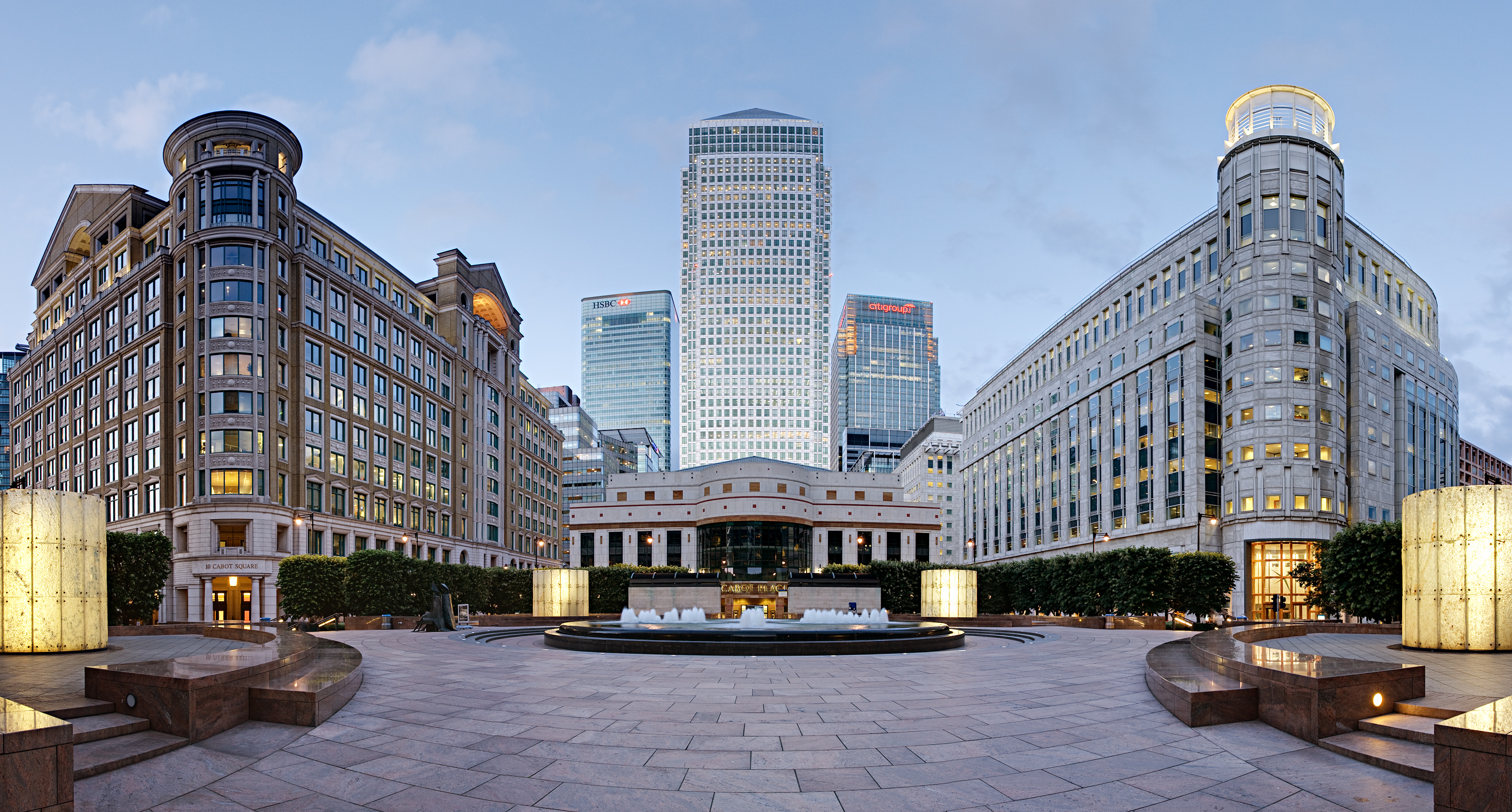
As the Charity Commission and The Pensions Regulator do for charities and pensions, the Financial Conduct Authority in Canary Wharf enforces statutory and fiduciary duties owed by investment businesses under the FSMA 2000. Most duties derive from trust law, but statute makes them compulsory and the regulator ensures compliance.

Once a trust has been validly formed, the trust's terms guide its operation. While professionally drafted trust instruments often contain a full description of how trustees are appointed, how they should manage the property, and their rights and obligations, the law supplies a comprehensive set of default rules.

Some were codified in the Trustee Act 2000 but others are construed by the courts. In many instances, English law follows a laissez-faire philosophy of "freedom of trust". In general, it will be left to the choice of the settlor to follow the law or to draft alternative rules. Where a trust instrument runs out or is silent, the law will fill the gaps.

In contrast, in specific trusts, particularly pensions within the Pensions Act 1995, charities under the Charities Act 2011, and investment trusts regulated by the Financial Services and Markets Act 2000, many rules regarding trusts' administration, and the duties of trustees are made mandatory by statute. This reflects the view of Parliament that beneficiaries in those cases lack bargaining power and need protection, especially through enhanced disclosure rights.

For family trusts, or private unmarketed trusts, the law can usually be contracted around, subject to an irreducible core of trust obligations. The scope of compulsory terms may be subject of debate, but Millett LJ in Armitage v Nurse viewed that every trustee must always act "honestly and in good faith for the benefit of the beneficiaries". In addition to general principles of good administration, trustees' primary duties include fulfilling a duty of "undivided loyalty" by avoiding any possibility of a conflict of interest, exercising proper care, and following the terms of the trust to fulfil their purpose.

=== Administration ===
Possibly the most important aspect of good trust management is having good trustees. In virtually all cases, a settlor will have identified who the trustees will be. Even if they have not or if the chosen trustees refuse, a court will, in the last resort, appoint one under the Public Trustee Act 1906. A court may also replace trustees who are acting detrimentally to the trusts.

Once a trust is running, Trusts of Land and Appointment of Trustees Act 1996 section 19 allows beneficiaries of full capacity to determine who the new trustees are, if other replacement procedures are not in the trust document. This is, however, simply an articulation of the general principle from Saunders v Vautier that beneficiaries of full age and sound mind may, by consensus, dissolve the trust or do with the property as they wish.

According to the Trustee Act 2000 sections 11 and 15, a trustee may not delegate their power to distribute trust property without liability, but they may delegate administrative functions and the power to manage assets if accompanied by a policy statement. As for the trust terms, these may be varied in any unforeseen emergency, but only in relation to the trustee's management powers, not a beneficiary's rights.

The Variation of Trusts Act 1958 allows courts to vary trust terms, particularly on behalf of minors, people not yet entitled, or those with remoter interests under a discretionary trust. For the latter group of people, who may have highly restricted rights or know very little about trust terms, the Privy Council affirmed in Schmidt v Rosewood Trust Ltd that courts have an inherent jurisdiction to administer trusts, especially when a requirement for information about a trust needs to be disclosed.

Trustees, especially in family trusts, may often be expected to perform their services for free. However, more commonly, a trust will make provision for some payment. In the absence of terms in the trust instrument, the Trustee Act 2000 sections 28–32 stipulate that professional trustees are entitled to a "reasonable remuneration." All trustees, agents, nominees, and custodians may be reimbursed for expenses from the trust fund as well. The courts have additionally stated in Re Duke of Norfolk's Settlement Trusts that there is a power to pay a trustee more for unforeseen but necessary work. Otherwise, all payments must be explicitly authorised to avoid the strict rule against any possibility of conflicts of interest.

=== Trust Registration Service ===
The Trust Registration Service (TRS) was established by The Money Laundering, Terrorist Financing and Transfer of Funds (Information on the Payer) Regulations 2017, which implemented the European Union's Money Laundering Directives in UK law, and whose scope was expanded by The Money Laundering and Terrorist Financing (Amendment) (EU Exit) Regulations 2020.

Most trusts have had to be registered with the TRS since 2022, after HM Revenue and Customs (HMRC) extended the scope of the regulations. The TRS provides HMRC and others a confidential online database and system from information supplied by trustees (or their agent), recording basic information about the trust including a description of each beneficiary, which must be updated as this information changes. This is to improve transparency and combat money laundering.

=== Duty of loyalty ===
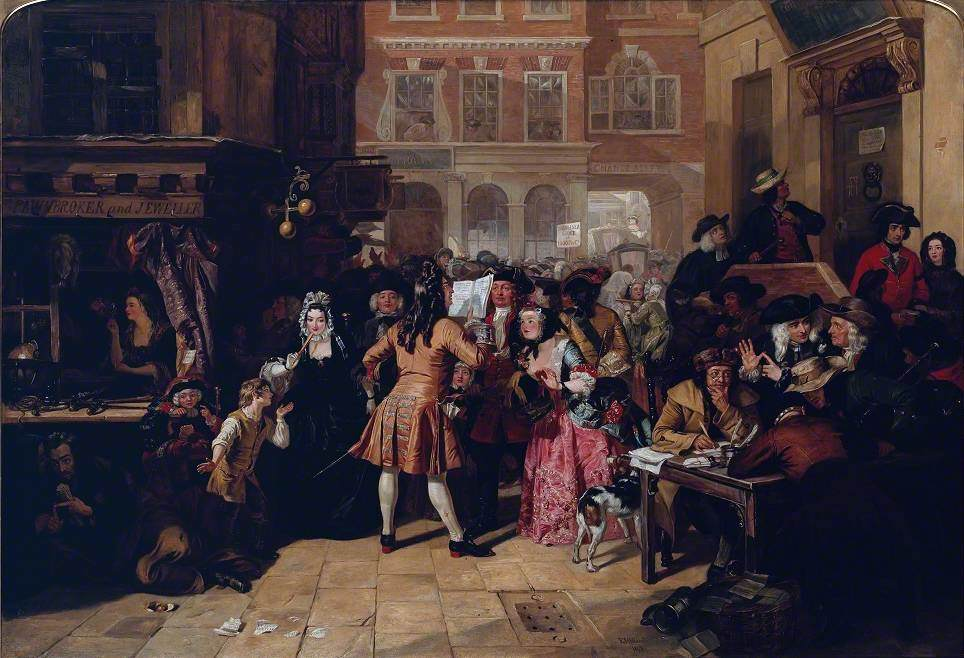
The South Sea Bubble by Edward Matthew Ward. After managers of the South Sea Company and its stock brokers, depicted here, created a stock market crash in 1719, Keech v Sandford decided all people handling others' money must avoid all possible conflicts of interest.

The core duty of a trustee is to pursue the interests of the beneficiaries, or anyone else the trust permits, except the interests of the trustee himself. Put positively, this is described as the "fiduciary duty of loyalty". The term "fiduciary" simply means someone in a position of trust and confidence, and because a trustee is the core example of this, English law has for three centuries consistently reaffirmed that trustees, put negatively, may have no possibility of a conflict of interest.

Shortly after the United Kingdom was formed, it had its first stock market crash in the South Sea Bubble, a crash where corrupt directors, trustees or politicians ruined the economy. Soon after, the Chancery Court decided Keech v Sandford. On a much smaller scale than the recent economic collapse, Keech claimed he was entitled to the profits his trustee, Sandford, had made by buying the lease on a market in Romford, now in East London. While Keech was still an infant, Sandford alleged he had been told by the market landlord that there would be no renewal for a child beneficiary. Only then, alleged Sandford, did he inquire and contract to purchase the lease in his own name. Lord King LC held this was irrelevant, because no matter how honest, the consequences of allowing a relaxed approach to trustee duties would be worse.

This may seem hard, that the trustee is the only person of all mankind who might not have the lease: but it is very proper that rule should be strictly pursued, and not in the least relaxed; for it is very obvious what would be the consequence of letting trustees have the lease, on refusal to renew to cestui que use.

The remedy for beneficiaries is restitution of all gains, and theoretically all profits are held on constructive trust for the trust fund. The same rule of seeking approval applies for conflicted transactions known as "self-dealing", where a trustee contracts on the trust's behalf with himself or a related party. While strict at its core, a trustee may at any time simply seek approval of beneficiaries, or the court, before taking an opportunity that the trust could be interested in. The scope of the duty, and authorised transactions of specific types, may also be defined in the trust deed to exclude liability. This is so, according to Millett LJ in Armitage v Nurse up to the point that the trustee still acts "honestly and in good faith for the benefit of the beneficiaries". Lastly, if a trustee has in fact acted honestly, while a court may formally confirm the trustee must give up his profits, the court can award the trustee a generous quantum meruit.

In Boardman v Phipps the solicitor, Mr Boardman, and a beneficiary, Tom Phipps, of the Phipps family trust saw an opportunity in one of the trust's investment companies and asked the managing trustee if the company could be bought out and restructured. The trustee said it was out of the question, but without seeking consent from the beneficiaries, Mr Boardman and Tom Phipps invested their own money. They made a profit for themselves, and the trust (which retained its investment) until another beneficiary, John, found out and sued to have the profits back. However, while almost every judge from Wilberforce J in the High Court, to the House of Lords (Lord Upjohn dissenting) agreed that no conflict of interest was allowable, they all approved generous quantum meruit to be deducted from any damages to reflect the effort of the defendants.

While the duty of loyalty, as well as all other duties, will certainly apply to formally appointed trustees, people who assume the responsibility of trustees will also be bound by the same duties. In old French, such a person is called a "trustee de son tort". According to Dubai Aluminium Co Ltd v Salaam to have fiduciary duties it is required that a person has assumed the function of a person in a position of trust and confidence. The assumption of such a position also opens such a fiduciary to claims for breaching a duty of care.

=== Duty of care ===
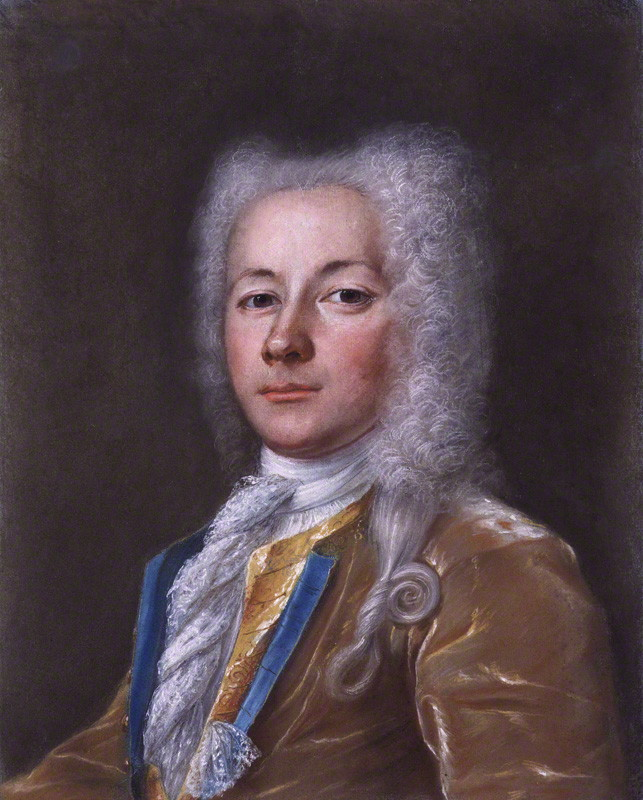
In 1742, Sir Robert Sutton and the other Charitable Corporation directors, who were meant to give microfinance to the poor, were found liable for the bankruptcy because of their corruption and negligence. Although poor decisions were not to be judged with hindsight, Lord Hardwicke applied a strict objective standard, now in the Trustee Act 2000 section 1.

The duty of care owed by trustees and fiduciaries has its partner in the common law of negligence, and was also long recognised by courts of equity. Millett LJ, however, in Bristol and West Building Society v Mothew emphasised that although recognised in equity, and applicable to fiduciaries, the duty of care is not itself a fiduciary duty, like the rule against conflicts of interest. This means that like ordinary negligence actions, the common law requirements for proving causation of loss apply, and the remedy for breach of duty is of compensation for losses rather than restitution of gains. In Mothew this meant that a solicitor (who occupies a fiduciary position, like a trustee) who negligently told a building society that its client had no second mortgage was not liable for the loss in the property's value after the client defaulted. Mr Mothew successfully argued that Bristol & West would have granted the loan in any case, and so his advice did not cause their loss.

The duty of care was codified in the Trustee Act 2000 section 1, as the "care and skill that is reasonable" to expect, regarding any special skills of the trustee. In practice this means that a trustee must be judged by what should be reasonably expected from another person in such a position of responsibility, being mindful not to judge decisions with the benefit of hindsight, and mindful of the inherent risk involved in any property management venture. As long ago as 1678, in Morley v Morley Lord Nottingham LC held that a trustee would not be liable if £40 of the trust fund's gold was robbed, so long as he otherwise performed his duties.

Probably one of the main parts of the duty of care, in managing trust property, will relate to a trustee's investment choices. In Learoyd v Whiteley, Lindley LJ elaborated the general prudent person rule, that in investments one must 'take such care as an ordinary prudent man would take if he were minded to make an investment for the benefit of other people for whom he felt morally bound to provide'. This meant a trustee who invested £5000 in mortgages of a brick field and four houses with a shop, and lost the lot when the businesses went insolvent, was liable for the losses on the brick field, whose value must have known to be bound to depreciate as bricks were taken out.

Bartlett v Barclays Bank Trust Co Ltd suggests investments must be actively monitored, particularly by professional trustees. This duty was broken when the Barclays corporate trustee department, where trust assets held 99 per cent of a company's shares, failed to get any information or board representation before a disastrous property speculation. In making investments, TA 2000 section 4 requires that "standard investment criteria" must be observed, essentially along the lines of modern portfolio theory about diversification of investments to reduce risk. Section 5 suggests advice be sought on such matters if needed, but otherwise may invest anything that an ordinary property owner would. Additional restrictions, however, may be imposed depending on the how courts view the purpose of the trust, and the scope of a trustee's discretion.

=== Purposes and discretion ===
Beyond the essential duty of loyalty and duty of care, the primary task occupying trustees will be to follow the terms of a trust document. Beyond the rules set out to be followed in the trust document, trustees will ordinarily have some measure of discretionary power, such as in making investment choices on the beneficiaries' behalf, or in managing and distributing trust funds. The courts have sought to control the exercise of discretion so it is used only for purposes consistent with the object of the trust settlement. In general it is said that decisions will be overturned if they are irrational, or perverse to the settlor's expectations, but also in two further particular ways.

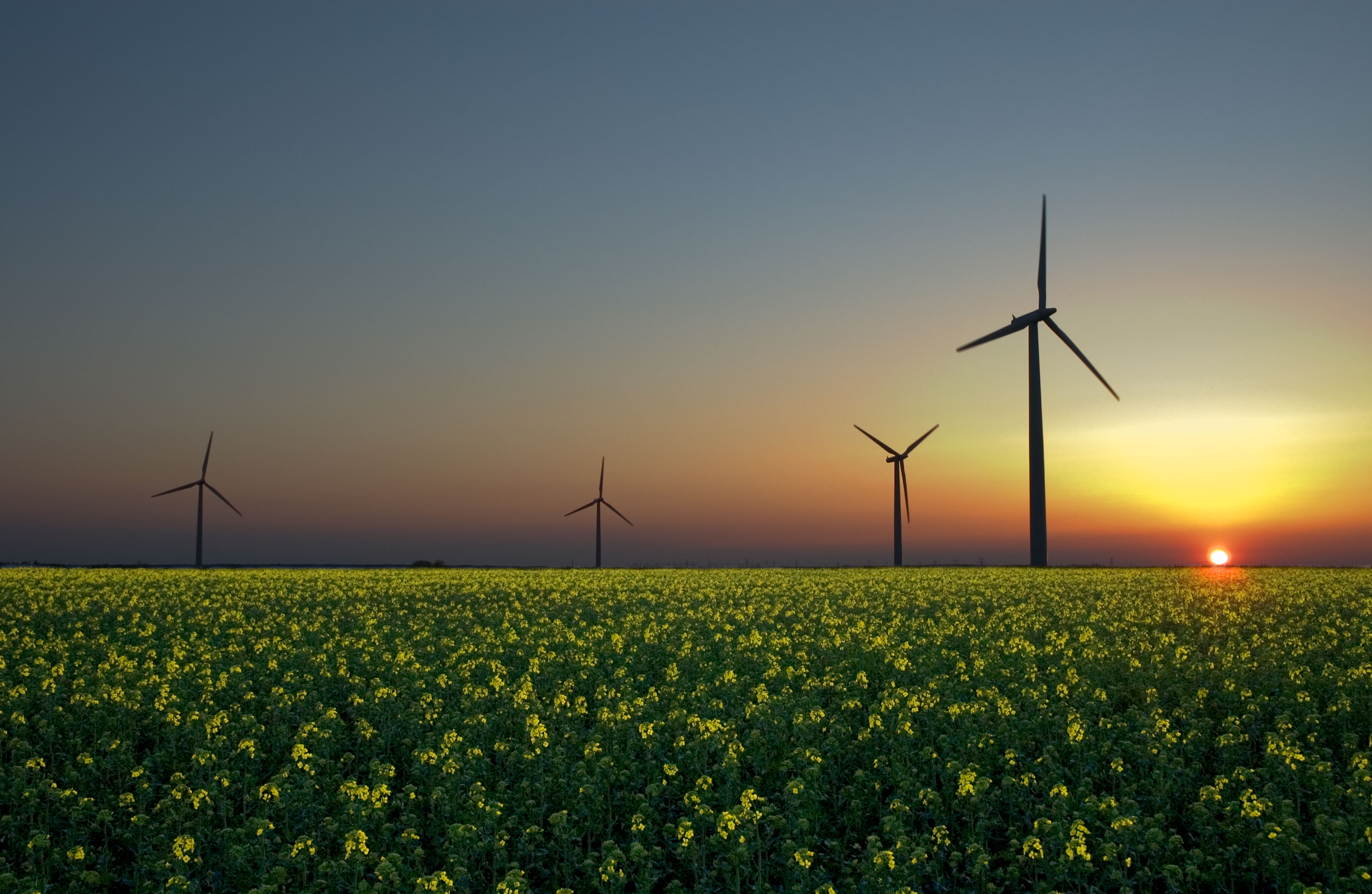
UK trust law permits ethical investment policies, to divest from assets beneficiaries object to or promote particular causes. A trust deed may expressly allow it, or otherwise trustees must simply not make financially detrimental decisions and sufficiently diversify investments under the Trustee Act 2000 section 4(3).

First, the courts have said that in choosing investments, trustees may not disregard the financial implications of the investment choice. In Cowan v Scargill the trustees of pensions represented by Arthur Scargill and the National Union of Mineworkers wished the pension fund to invest more in the troubled UK mining industry, by excluding investments, for instance, in competing industries, while the trustees appointed by the employer did not. Megarry J held the action would violate a trustee's duty if this action was taken. Drawing a parallel of refusing to invest in South African companies (during Apartheid) he warned that "the best interests of the beneficiaries are normally their best financial interests."

Although this was thought in some quarters to preclude ethical investment, it was made clear in Harries v Church Commissioners for England that the terms of a trust deed may explicitly authorise or prohibit certain investments, that if the object of a trust is, for example, Christian charity then a trustee could plainly invest in "Christian" things. In Harries, Donald Nicholls VC held that unless financial performance could be proven to be harmed, a trustee for church clergy retirement could take ethical considerations into account when investing money, and so avoid investments contrary to the religion's principles.

By analogy, a trade union pension trustee could refuse to invest in apartheid South Africa, while the government there suppressed unions. The government commissioned report by Roy Goode on Pension Law Reform confirmed the view that trustees may have an ethical investment policy and use their discretion in following it. The modern approach in trust law is consistent with the UK company law duty of directors to pay regard to all stakeholders, not merely shareholders, in a company's management. Trustees must simply invest according to general principles of the duty of care, and diversification.

The second primary area where courts have sought to constrain trustee discretion, but recently have retreated, is in the rule that trustees' decisions may be interfered with if irrelevant issues are taken into account, or relevant issues are ignored. There had been suggestions that a decision could be wholly void, which led to a flood of claims where trustees had failed to get advice on taxation of trust transactions and were sometimes successful in having the transaction annulled and escaping payments to the Revenue. However, in the leading case, Pitt v Holt the Supreme Court reaffirmed that poorly considered decisions may only become voidable (and so cannot be cancelled if a third party, like the Revenue, is affected) and only if mistakes are "fundamental" can a transaction be wholly void. In one appeal, a trustee for her husband's worker compensation got poor advice and was liable for more inheritance tax, and in the second, a trustee for his children got poor advice and was liable for more capital gains tax. The UK Supreme Court found that both transactions were valid. If a trustee had acted in breach of duty, but within its powers, then a transaction was voidable. However, on the facts, the trustees seeking advice had fulfilled their duty (and so the advisers could be liable for negligence instead).

== Breach and remedies ==
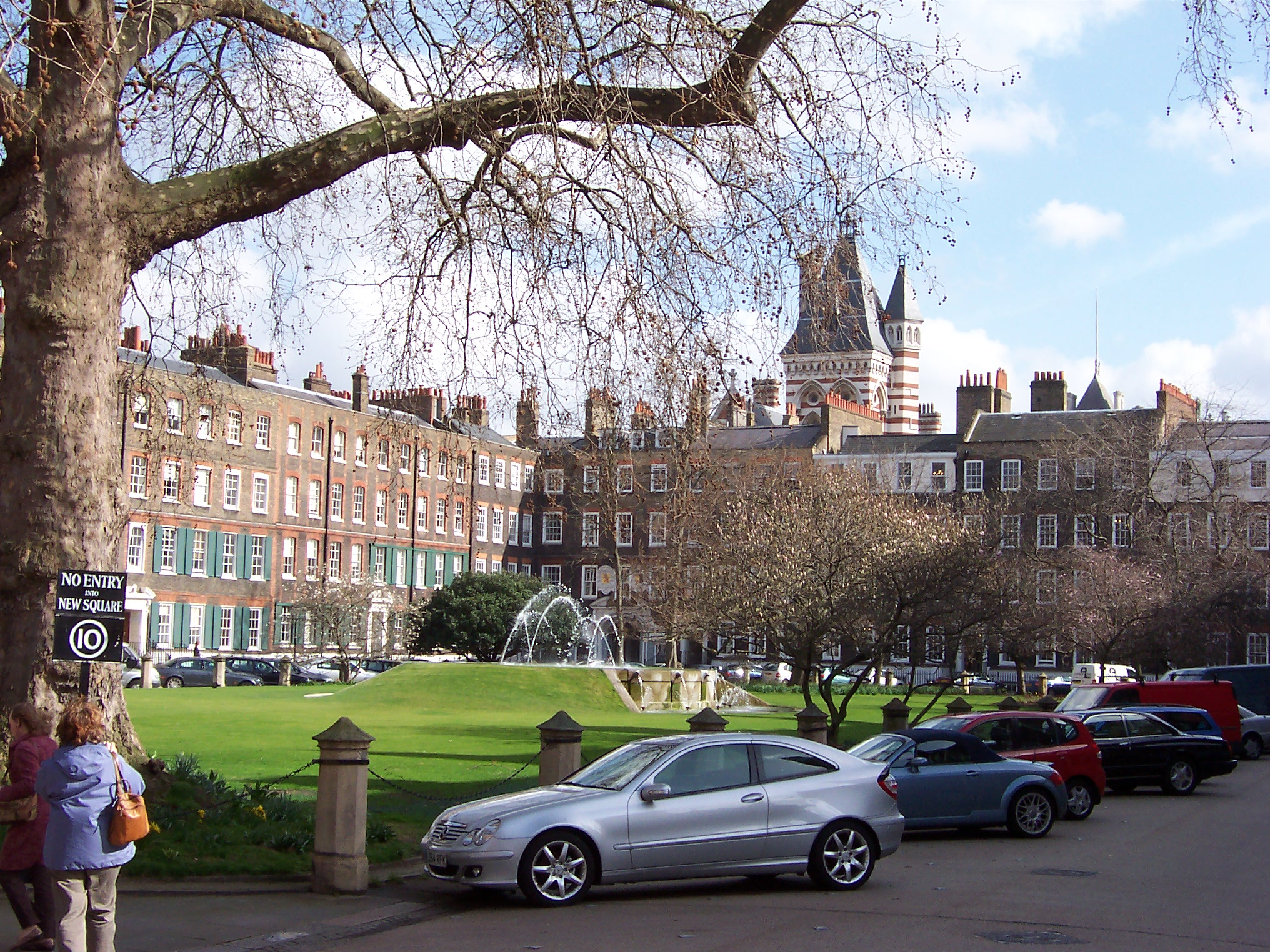
Lincoln's Inn, off Chancery Lane, London, is the traditional home of Chancery barristers.

When trustees fail in their main duties, the law imposes remedies according to the nature of the breach. In general, breaches of rules surrounding performance of the trust's terms can be remedied through an award of specific performance, or compensation. Breaches of the duty of care will trigger a right to compensation. Breaches of the duty to avoid conflicts of interest, and misapplications of property will give rise to a restitutionary claim, to restore the property taken away. In these last two situations, the courts of equity developed further principles of liability that could be applied even when a trustee had gone bankrupt. Some recipients of property that came from a breach of trust, as well as people who had assisted in a breach of trust, might incur liability.

Equity recognised not merely a personal, but also a proprietary claim over assets taken in breach of trust, and perhaps also profits made in breach of the duty of loyalty. A proprietary claim meant that the claimant could demand the thing in priority to other creditors of the bankrupt trustee.

Alternatively, the courts would follow an asset or trace its value if the trust property was exchanged for some other asset. If trust property had been given to a third party, the trust fund could claim back the property as of right, unless the recipient was a bona fide purchaser. Generally, any recipient of trust property who knew about the breach of trust (or maybe ought to have known) could be made to give back the value, even if they had themselves exchanged the thing for other assets. Lastly, against people who may never have received trust property but had assisted in a breach of trust, and had done so dishonestly, a claim arose to return the property's value.

=== Remedies against trustees ===
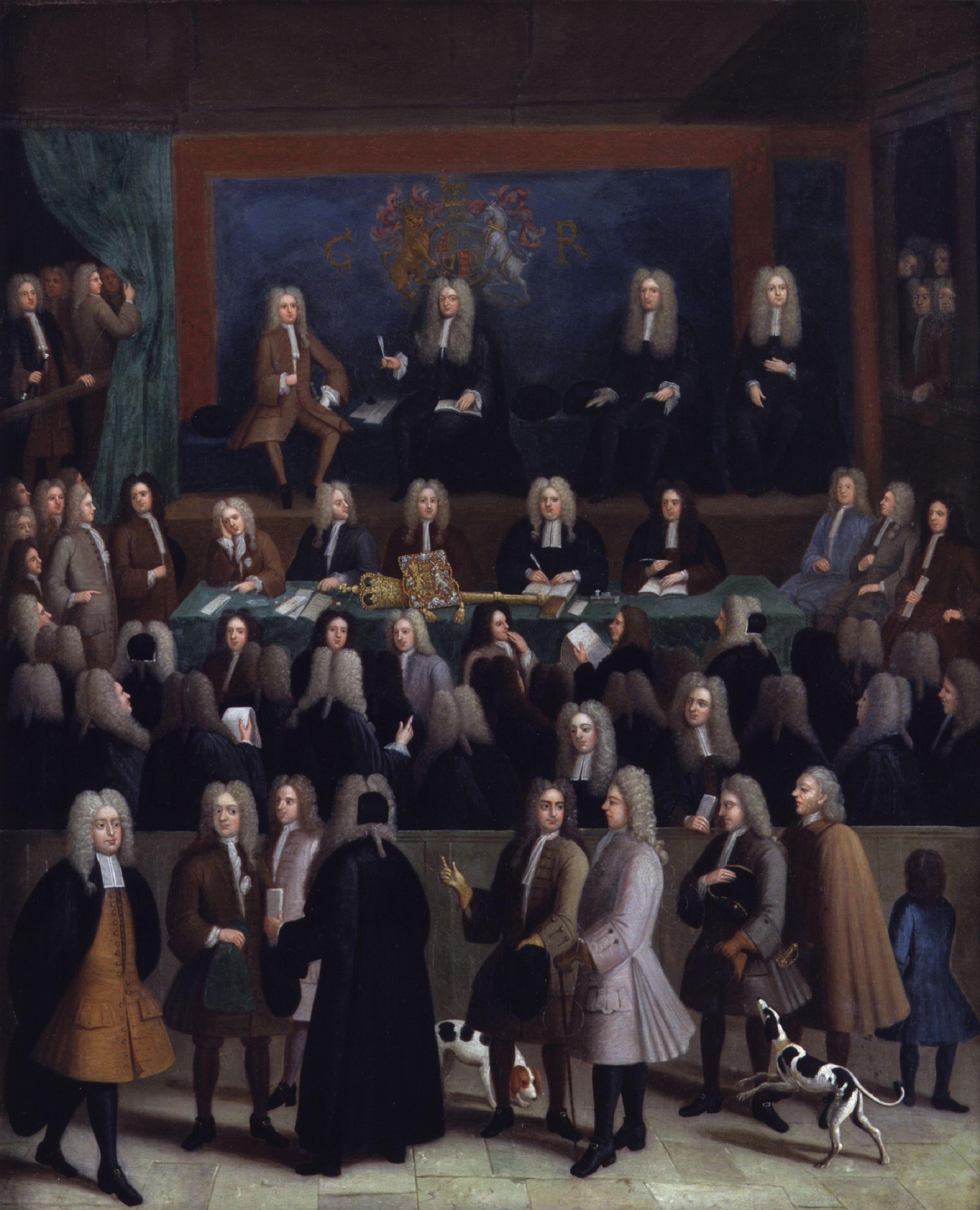
The Chancery Court, depicted here in the early 18th century, recognised a wider variety of remedies than the common law courts.

If a trustee has broken a duty owed to the trust, there are three main remedies. First, specific performance may generally be awarded in cases where the beneficiary merely wishes to compel a trustee to follow the trust's terms, or to prevent an anticipated breach. Second, for losses, beneficiaries may claim compensation. The applicable principles are disputed, given the historical language of requiring a trustee to "account" for things which go wrong. One view suggested that at the very moment a trustee breaches a duty, for instance by making an erroneous investment without considering relevant matters, beneficiaries have a right to see the trust accounts are surcharged, to erase the transpiring loss (and "falsified" to restore to the trust fund unauthorised gains).

In Target Holdings Ltd v Redferns the argument was taken to a new level, where a solicitor (a fiduciary, like a trustee) was given £1.5m by Target Holdings Ltd to hold for a loan for some property developers, but released the money before it was meant to (when purchase of the development property was completed). The money did reach the developers, but the venture was a flop, and money lost. Target Holdings Ltd attempted to sue Redferns for the whole sum, but the House of Lords held that the loss was caused by the venture flop, not the solicitor's action outside instructions. It was, however, observed that the common law rules of remoteness would not apply. Similarly in Swindle v Harrison a solicitor, Mr Swindle, could not be sued for the loss of Ms Harrison's second home's value after he gave her negligent and dishonest advice about loans, because she would have taken the loan and made the purchase anyway, and the house value drop was unrelated to his breach of duty.

The third kind of remedy, for unauthorised gains, is restitution. In Murad v Al Saraj the Murad sisters entered a joint venture (creating a fiduciary relation, like for trustees) with Mr Al Saraj to buy a hotel. He deceitfully told them he was investing all his own money, when in fact he set off a debt from the seller and took an undisclosed commission. When sued to give up the profits he made, he submitted that the sisters would have entered the transaction even if they had known what he had done. Arden LJ rejected this argument, affirming that upon such a wrong, it was not open for the fiduciary to argue what might, hypothetically, have happened. A reduction in liability could only come from a determination of the value of skill and effort contributed. This is less generously quantified for dishonest fiduciaries, but generous allowances are typically given, as in Boardman v Phipps for fiduciaries who all along act honestly.

Trustees who are found to commit wrongs may also have a defence under the Trustee Act 1925 sections 61–62. This gives courts discretion to relieve liability for people who acted "honestly and reasonably, and ought fairly to be excused". There may also be exclusion clauses in the trust deed, up to the point of removing liability for fraud and open conflicts of interest. Chiefly exclusion clauses will erase liability for breaches of the duty of care, although for professional trustees the ability to do this is constrained by the Unfair Contract Terms Act 1977. If agreements for money management take place through contracts, a professional trustee probably cannot exclude liability for breach of contract under section 3, because given that he would be better placed to take out insurance liability exclusion will probably not be reasonable under section 11. Lastly, the Limitation Act 1980 sections 21–22 prevents claims for innocent or negligent trust breach being pursued six years after the right of action accrues, again with the exception for fraud or property converted by trustees for their own use, where there is no limit.

=== Tracing ===
Partly because it may not always be the case that a wrongdoing trustee can be found, or remains solvent, tracing became an important step in restitutionary claims for breach of trust. Tracing means tracking the value of an asset that properly belongs to a trust fund, such as a car, shares, money, or profits made by a trustee through a conflict of interest. If those things are exchanged for other things (i.e. money or assets) then the value residing in the new thing can potentially be claimed by the beneficiaries.

For example, in an early case, Taylor v Plumer a dishonest broker, Mr Walsh, was given £22,200 in a banker's draft and was meant to invest in Exchequer bills (UK government bonds) for a Sir Thomas Plumer. Instead he bought gold doubloons and was planning a get-away to the Caribbean until he was apprehended at Falmouth. Lord Ellenborough held that the property belonged to Sir Thomas, in whatever form it had become. It may also be that the value of the traced trust money has changed, and possibly risen considerably.

In the leading case, Foskett v McKeown an investment manager wrongfully took £20,440 from his clients, paid the last two out of five instalments on a life insurance policy, and committed suicide. The insurance company paid out £1,000,000, although under the policy's terms this would have been paid out anyway. The majority of the House of Lords held that clients could trace their money into the payout and claim a proportionate share (£400,000). Theoretically the case was controversial, as the House of Lords rejected that such a tracing claim was founded upon unjust enrichment, as opposed to being the vindication of a property right.

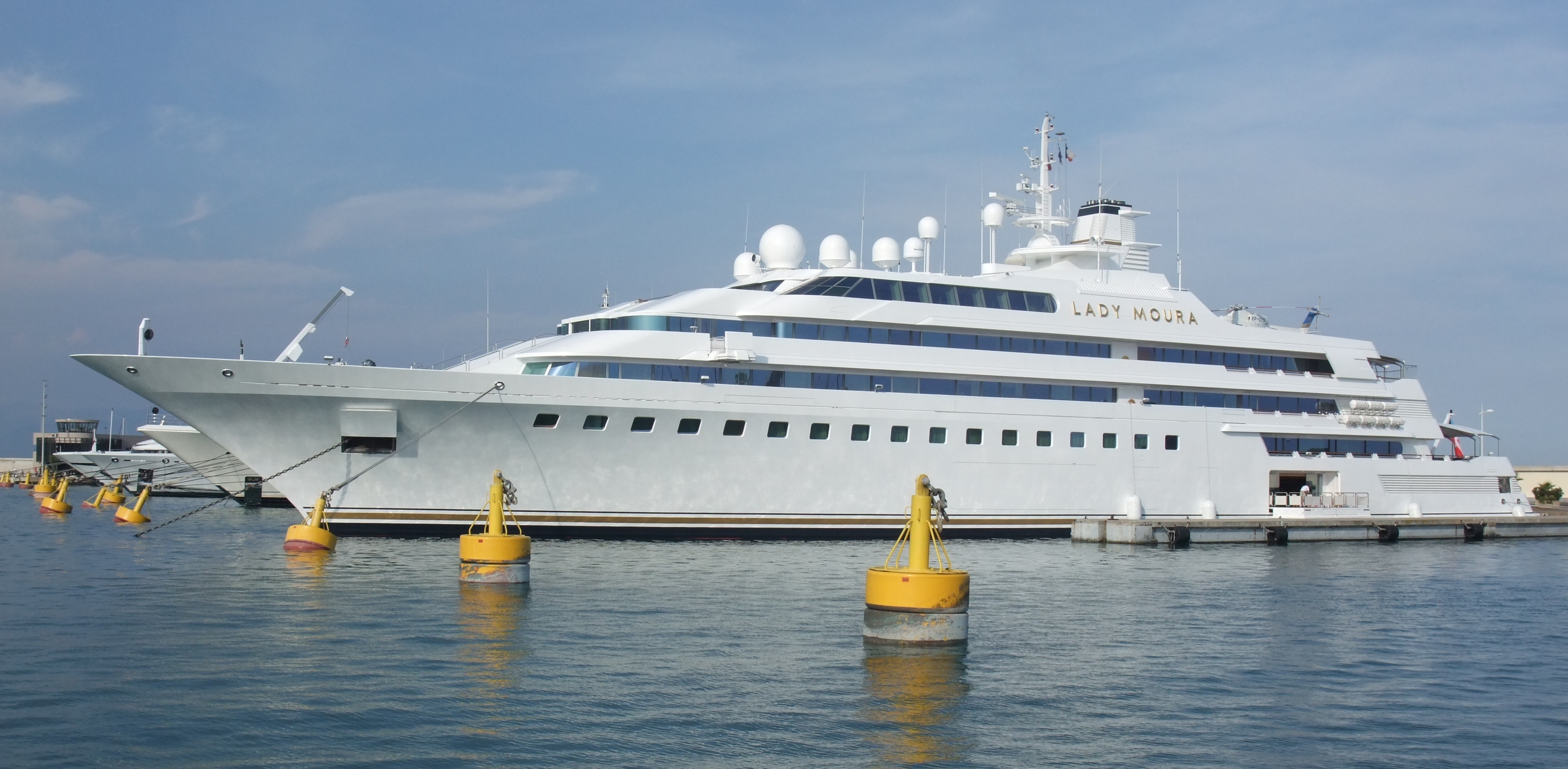
Robert Maxwell stole the pension funds of his employees at the Daily Mirror and accidentally fell off his yacht, the Lady Mona K, near the Canary Islands. Bishopsgate Investment Mgt Ltd v Homan held Maxwell and his inheritors were strictly liable to account for misapplication of the assets.

When trust assets are mixed up with property of the trustee, or other people, the general approach of the courts is to resolve the issues in favour of the wronged beneficiary.

For example, in Re Hallett's Estate, a solicitor sold £2145 worth of bonds he was meant to hold for his client and put the money in his account. Although money had subsequently been drawn and redeposited in the account, the balance of £3000 was enough to return all the money to his clients. According to Lord Jessel MR, a fiduciary "cannot be heard to say that he took away the trust money when he had a right to take away his own money".

Again, in Re Oatway, a trustee who took money and made a deposit with his bank account, and then bought shares which rose in value, was held by Joyce J to have used the beneficiary's money on the shares. This was the most beneficial result possible. When trust assets are mixed up with money from other beneficiaries, the courts have had more difficulty.

Originally, by the rule in Clayton's case, it was said that the money taken out of a bank account would be presumed to come from the first person's money that was put in. So in that case it meant that when a banking partnership, before it went insolvent, made payments to one of its depositors, Mr Clayton, the payments made discharged the debt of the first partner that died. However, this "first in, first out" rule is essentially disapplied in all but the simplest cases.

In Barlow Clowes International Ltd v Vaughan, Woolf LJ held that it would not apply if it might be 'impracticable or result in injustice', or if it ran contrary to the parties' intentions. There, Vaughan was one of a multitude of investors in Barlow Clowes' managed fund portfolios. Their investments had been numerous, of different sizes and over long periods of time, and each investor knew that they had bought into a collective investment scheme. Accordingly, when Barlow Clowes went insolvent, each investor was held to simply share the loss proportionately, or pari passu. A third alternative, said by Leggatt LJ to generally be fairer (though complex to compute) is to share losses through a "rolling pari passu" system. Given the complexity of the accounts, and the trading of each investor, this approach was not used in Vaughan, but it would have seen a proportionate reduction of all account holders' interest at each step of an account's depletion.

A significant topic of debate, however, is whether the courts should allow tracing into an asset which has been bought on credit. The weight of authority suggests this is possible, either through subrogation, or on the justification that the assets of a recipient who pays off a debt on a thing are "swollen".

In Bishopsgate Investment Management Ltd v Homan, however, the Court of Appeal held that pensioners of the crooked newspaper owner, Robert Maxwell, who had their money stolen, could not have a charge over the money in whose overdrawn accounts their money was deposited. It was said that when money was put into an overdrawn account, it was simply exhausted, and even if the money had been later used for the company's purposes, the law must end the tracing exercise. This result was doubted by the Privy Council in Brazil v Durant International Corporation, as Lord Toulson advised that backwards tracing is possible if there is "a coordination between the depletion of the trust fund and the acquisition of the asset which is the subject of the tracing claim, looking at the whole transaction, such as to warrant the court attributing the value of the interest acquired to the misuse of the trust fund."

=== Liability for receipt ===
Although beneficiaries of a trust, or those owed fiduciary duties, will ordinarily wish to sue trustees first for breach of obligations, the trustee may have disappeared, or become insolvent, or perhaps the beneficiaries will desire to have a specific asset returned. In all these situations, the law allows a limited remedy if a person that received trust property is not "equity's darling": the "bona fide purchaser" of the asset.

A bona fide purchaser of property, even if property is received after a breach of trust, has long been held to take free of any claims by prior owners, if they acted in good faith, committed no wrong, and they have paid for the property. When the value in assets is traced, this process is technically said to be "genuinely neutral as to the rights" a claimant may have.

Only if recipients have committed additional wrongs, through some form of negligence, knowledge or dishonesty, will they liable, with a good claim at the end of the tracing process. However, the law is unsettled on what is needed, and divides between a traditional common law or equity approach, on the one hand, and a more modern unjust enrichment and tort law analysis on the other hand. In all cases, however, the recipient must have received property for their "own use and benefit". This means that in cases where solicitors, and potentially banks, or other parties that merely act as conduits, that receive money simply to pass it onto someone else, they have not been regarded as a liable recipient.

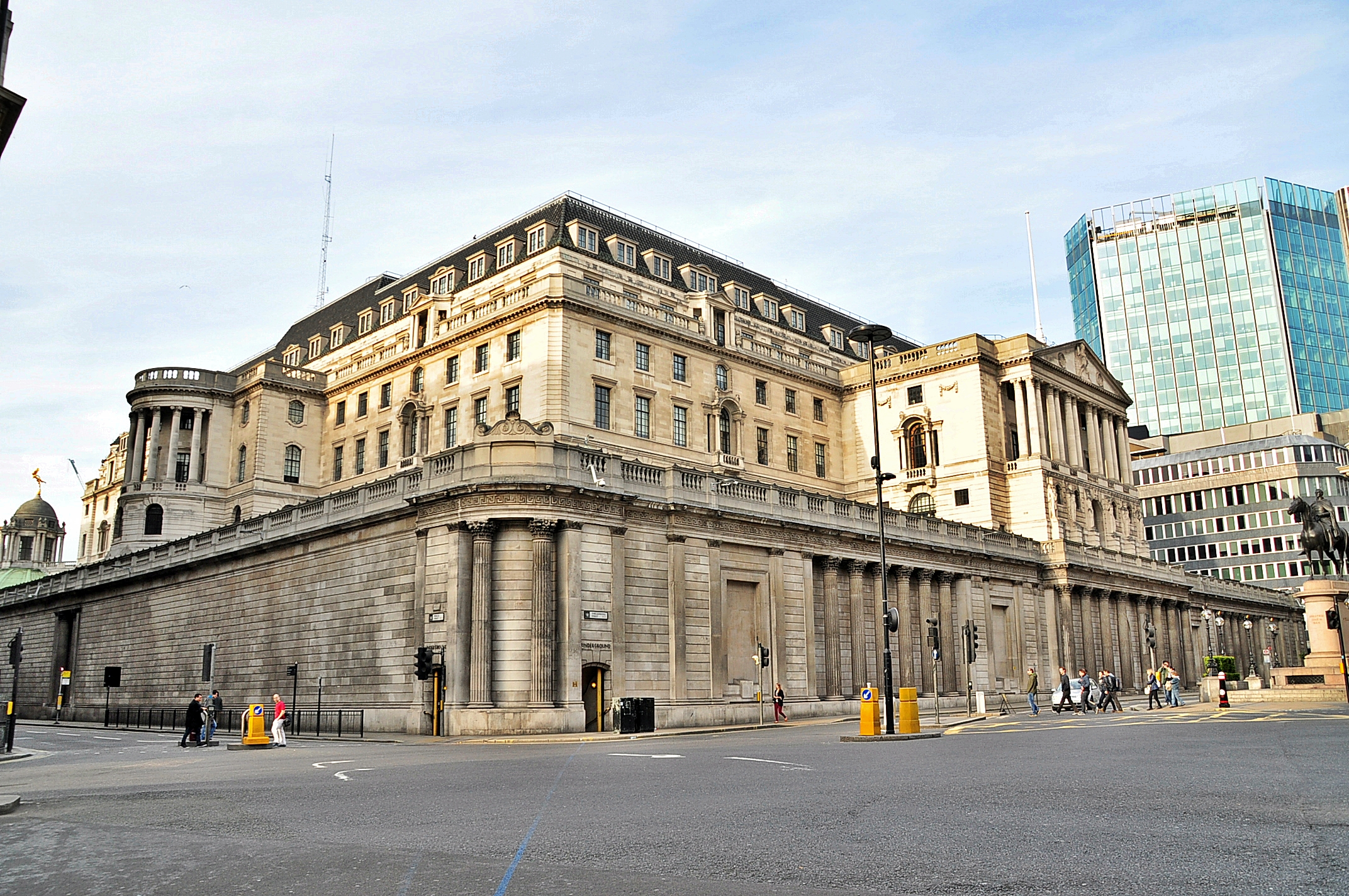
The Bank of England closed the Bank of Credit and Commerce International, the world's 7th largest in 1991, after learning it had engaged in fraud and allowed terrorist groups to open accounts.

Traditionally, common law used to allow a claim from anybody who had money, but had lost it or had been deprived of it, from a person who had received the money without payment, as of right. This action for "money had and received" was, however, limited to money, and was said to be limited to money in physical form. In equity, an action could be brought for return of any property that could be traced, but the courts said liability was limited to people who in some sense had "knowledge" of a breach of trust.

In 2001, the Court of Appeal in Bank of Credit and Commerce International (Overseas) Ltd v Akindele stated that the touchstone of liability is that a defendant acted "unconscionably". In that case, Akindele, a Nigerian businessman, was sued by the liquidators of the disgraced and insolvent bank, BCCI to return over $6.6m. Akindele said he received this payment, so far as he knew, as part of a legitimate fixed return deal, when in fact BCCI was engaging in a fraudulent scheme to buy its own shares, and thus inflate its share price. Nourse LJ held that on these facts, Akindele had done nothing "unconscionable" and was not liable to return the money. In other cases, however, it is apparent that the standard has been less lenient, and set at negligence.

In 1980 in Belmont Finance Corp v Williams Furniture Ltd Goff LJ held that if one "ought to know, that it was a breach of trust" when property is received then liability will follow. Accordingly, different courts have differed on the requisite threshold of liability. Some have thought liability for receipt should be limited to "wilfully and recklessly failing to make such inquiries as an honest and reasonable man would make", while others have favoured a simple negligence standard, when a breach of trust would have been obvious to an honest, reasonable person.

The latter view is consistent with an unjust enrichment analysis, favoured by the late Peter Birks and Lord Nicholls in extrajudicial writing. This favours strict liability upon receipt of any property, unless it is paid for. If the recipient is not a bona fide purchaser, they must make restitution of the property to the former owner to avoid unjust enrichment. This was an approach adopted by the House of Lords in Re Diplock. However, unlike Re Diplock the modern unjust enrichment analysis would allow a defence, if the recipient had changed her position, for instance by spending money that would not otherwise have been spent, a defence recognised in Lipkin Gorman v Karpnale. This approach ends by suggesting that even if the property is paid for, yet the recipient ought to have known that it came from a breach of trust, they will be deemed to have committed an equitable wrong (i.e. like a tort) and must restore the property to the previous owner anyway. It remains to be seen whether equity's understanding of conscience will align with the standard test for the duty of care in tort.

=== Dishonest assistance ===
Liability for breach of trust extends not only to the fiduciary who breaches his or her duty, and potentially to recipients of trust property, but may also reach people who have assisted the breach of fiduciary duty. Generally speaking there must be both an act of assistance, and then a dishonest state of mind. The first requirement is that an act was done by a defendant which somehow lent assistance to the wrongdoers. In Brinks Ltd v Abu-Saleh Mrs Abu-Saleh drove her husband to Switzerland. She thought this was part of some tax evasion scheme, but did not ask (or was not told, it was accepted). In fact Mr Abu-Saleh was laundering gold bullion, the proceeds of a theft. Rimer J held that she had not "assisted", because by driving she was apparently only making her husband's experience more pleasant. This was not an act of assistance.

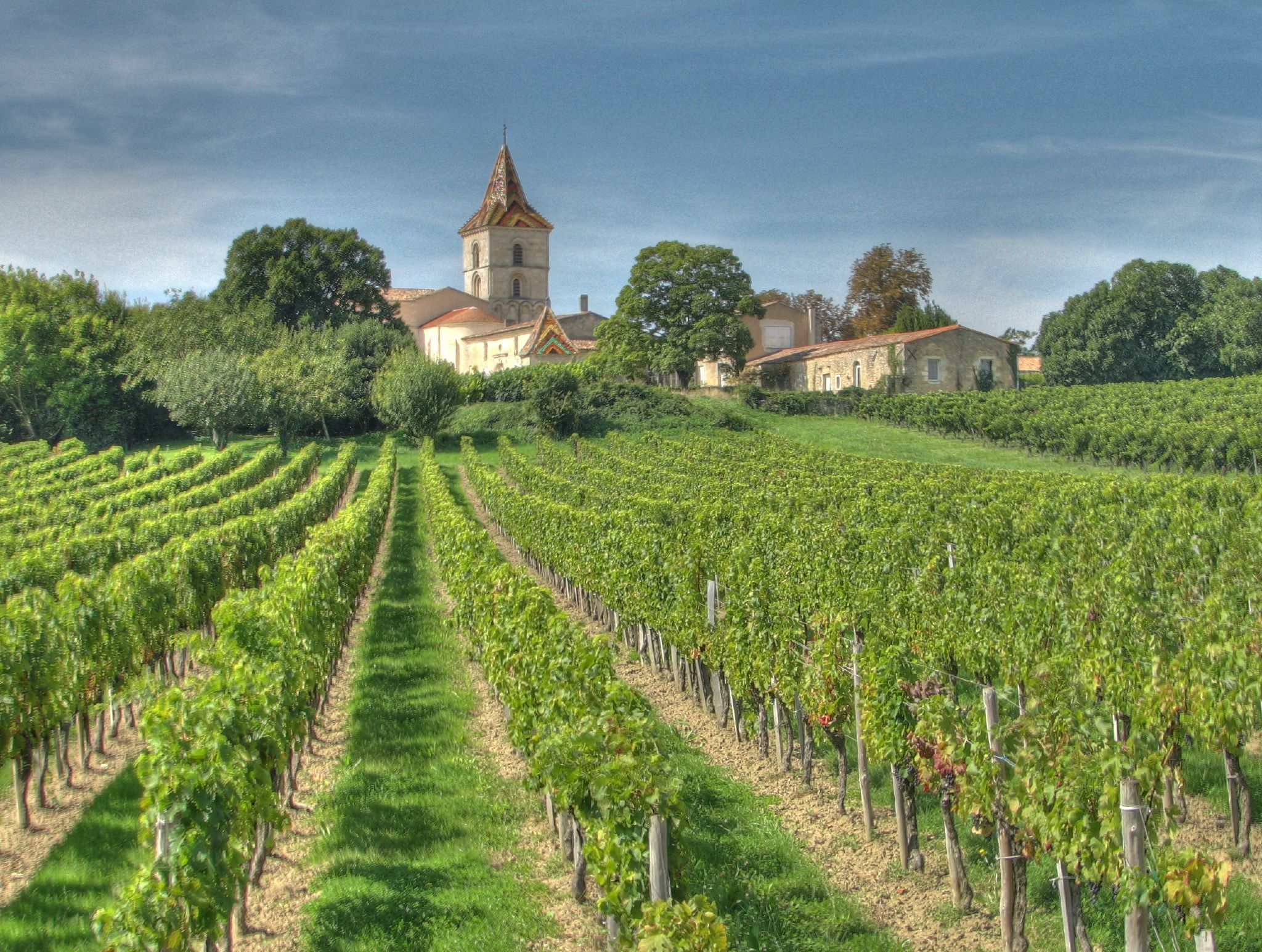
The founder of the investment company Barlow Clowes dishonestly channelled investors' money into perks for himself and his wife including a Bordeaux chateau and vineyard, before they were uncovered and prosecuted. The Privy Council advised that Isle of Man money agents who assisted in a way honest people would think is dishonest were liable for investors' losses.

The courts had been divided over what, in addition to an act of "assistance" was an appropriate mental element of fault, if any. In Abu-Saleh it was thought that it was also not enough for Ms Abu-Saleh have been dishonest about the wrong thing (tax evasion, rather than breach of trust), but this view was held to be wrong by Lord Hoffmann in the leading case, Barlow Clowes International Ltd v Eurotrust International Ltd. Before this, in Royal Brunei Airlines Sdn Bhd v Tan, the Privy Council had resolved that "dishonesty" was a necessary element. It was also irrelevant whether the trustee was dishonest if the assistant that was actually being sued was dishonest. This meant that when Mr Tan, the managing director of a travel booking company, took booking money that his company was supposed to hold on trust for Royal Brunei Airlines, and used it for his own business, Mr Tan was liable to repay all sums personally. It did not matter whether the trustee (the company) was dishonest or not.

By contrast, in Twinsectra Ltd v Yardley it seemed to be held that a solicitor, Mr Leech, who paid money to Mr Yardley to buy property, was not dishonest because he genuinely thought he could do this. In Barlow Clowes International Ltd v Eurotrust International Ltd the Privy Council clarified that the test for "dishonesty", however, is not subjective like the criminal law test from R v Ghosh. It is objective. If a reasonable person would think an action is dishonest, the action is dishonest, and the defendant need not appreciate that they have acted dishonestly by the standards of the community. This led the Privy Council to agree that a director of an Isle of Man company was dishonest, because, even though he did not know for sure, he was found at trial to have suspected that money passing through his hands was from a securities fraud scheme by Barlow Clowes. The result is that, because liability is based on objective fault, more defendants will be caught.

If a claimant does bring an action for dishonest assistance, or liability for receipt, Tang Man Sit v Capacious Investments Ltd affirmed the principle that the claimant may not be overcompensated by suing for the same thing twice. So, Capacious Investments Ltd could make a claim against the late Mr Tang Man Sit's personal representative for renting out its properties, and it could ask the court to assess the amounts of both (1) loss of profits, and (2) loss of use and occupation, but then it could only claim one.

== Policy, economics, and society ==
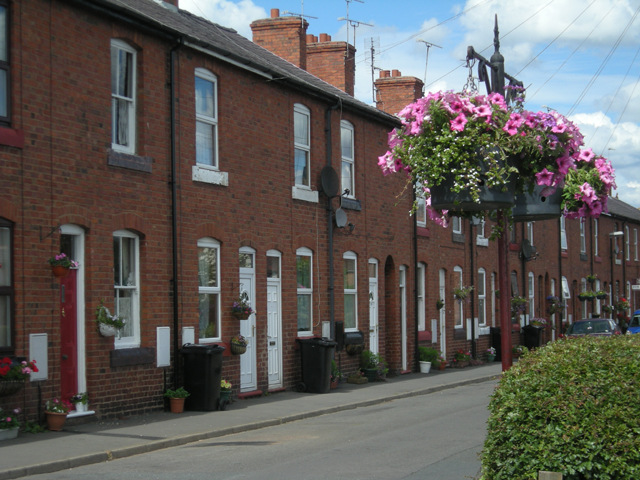
Trust law plays a major role in protecting people's occupational pensions, in investments like unit trusts, and in determining "equitable" ownership when people buy, and live together in, a home.

Over the 20th century, trusts came to be used for multiple purposes beyond the classical role of parcelling out wealthy families' estates, wills, or charities. As more working-class people became more affluent, they began to be able to save for retirement through occupational pensions. After the Old Age Pensions Act 1908, everyone who worked and paid National Insurance would probably have access to the minimal state pension, but if people wanted to maintain their living standards, they would need more. Occupational pensions would typically be constituted through a trust deed, after being bargained for by a trade union under a collective agreement.

After World War Two, the number of people with occupational pensions rose further, and gradually regulation was introduced to ensure that people's "pension promise" was protected. The settlor would usually be the employer and employee jointly, and the savings would be transferred to a trustee for the benefit of the employee. Most regulation, especially after the Robert Maxwell scandals and the Goode Report, was directed at ensuring that the employer cannot dominate, or abuse its position through undue influence over the trustee or the trust fund.

The second main use of the trust came to be in other financial investments, though not necessarily for retirement. The unit trust, since their launch in 1931, became a popular vehicle for holding "units" in a fund that would invest in various assets, such as company shares, gilts or government bonds or corporate bonds. One person investing alone might not have much money to spread the risk of his or her investments, and so the unit trust offered an attractive way to pool many investors wealth, and share the profits (or losses). Nowadays, unit trusts have been mostly superseded by Open-ended investment companies, which do much the same thing, but are companies selling shares, rather than trusts. Nevertheless, trusts are widely used, and notorious in offshore trusts in "tax havens", where people hire an accountant or lawyer to make an argument that shifting assets in some new way will avoid tax.

The third main contemporary use of the trust has been in the family home, though not as an expressly declared trust. As gender inequality began to narrow, both partners to a marriage would often be contributing money, or work, to pay the mortgage, make their home, or raise children together. A number of members of the judiciary became active from the late 1960s in declaring that even if one partner was not on the legal title deeds, she or he would still have an equitable property interest in the home under a "resulting trust" or (more normally today) a "constructive trust". In essence the courts would acknowledge the existence of a property right, without the trust being expressly declared. Some courts said it reflected an implicit common intention, while others said the use of the trust reflected the need to do justice. In this way, trusts continued to fulfill their historical function of mitigating strict legal rules in the interests of equity.

=== Pension and investment trusts ===
Pension trusts are the most economically significant kind of trust, totalling over £3 trillion worth of retirement savings in the UK in 2021. Other forms of trusts in investment include mutual funds, unit trusts, and investment trusts though these are commonly organised as companies and hold money on trust for many people. Pensions are often organised as companies and hold money on trust for beneficiaries who are people at work. Because workers pay for their savings through their work, often to a fund set up by an employer and a workplace union, the regulation of pensions differs considerably from general trust law. The construction of a pension trust deed must comply with the basic term of mutual trust and confidence in the employment relationship.

Employees are entitled to be informed by their employer about how to make the best of their pension rights. Moreover, workers must be treated equally, on grounds of gender or otherwise, in their pension entitlements. The management of a pension trust must be partly codetermined by the pension beneficiaries, so that a minimum of one third of a trustee board are elected or "member nominated trustees". The Secretary of State has the power by regulation, as yet unused, to increase the minimum up to one half.

Trustees are charged with the duty to manage the fund in the best interests of the beneficiaries, in a way that reflects their general and ethical preferences, by investing the savings in company shares, bonds, real estate or other financial products. There is a strict prohibition on the misapplication of any assets. Unlike the general position for a trustee's duty of care, the Pensions Act 1995 section 33 stipulates that trustee investment duties may not be excluded by the trust deed.

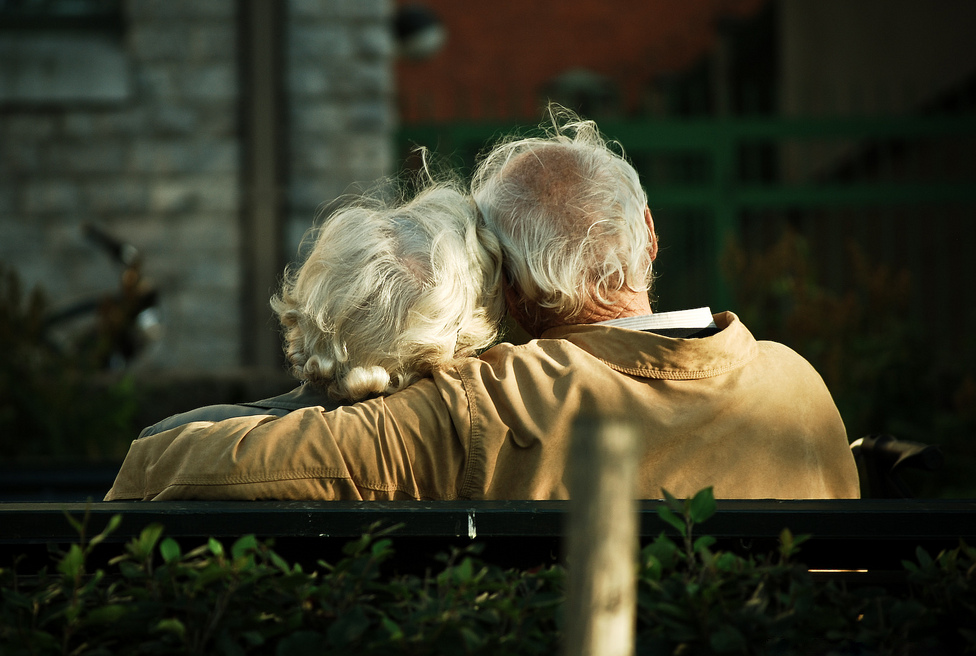
Every jobholder will from 2012 be automatically enrolled in an occupational pension, and can codetermine how their retirement savings are invested and their voice in company shares is used.

Because pension schemes save up significant amounts of money, which many people rely on in retirement, protection against an employer's insolvency, or dishonesty, or risks from the stock market were seen as necessary after the 1992 Robert Maxwell scandal. Defined contribution funds must be administered separately, not subject to an employer's undue influence. The Insolvency Act 1986 also requires that outstanding pension contributions are a preferential debt over creditors, except those with fixed security. However, defined benefit schemes are also meant to insure everyone has a stable income regardless of whether they live a shorter or longer period after retirement.

The Pensions Act 2004 sections 222 to 229 require that pension schemes have a minimum "statutory funding objective", with a statement of "funding principles", whose compliance is periodically evaluated by actuaries, and shortfalls are made up. The Pensions Regulator is the non-departmental body which is meant to oversee these standards, and compliance with trustee duties, which cannot be excluded. However, in The Pensions Regulator v Lehman Brothers the Supreme Court concluded that if the Pensions Regulator issued a "Financial Support Direction" to pay up funding, and it was not paid when a company had gone insolvent, this ranked like any other unsecured debt in insolvency, and did not have priority over banks that hold floating charges. In addition, there exists a Pensions Ombudsman who may hear complaints and take informal action against employers who fall short of their statutory duties. If all else fails, the Pension Protection Fund guarantees a sum is ensured, up to a statutory maximum.

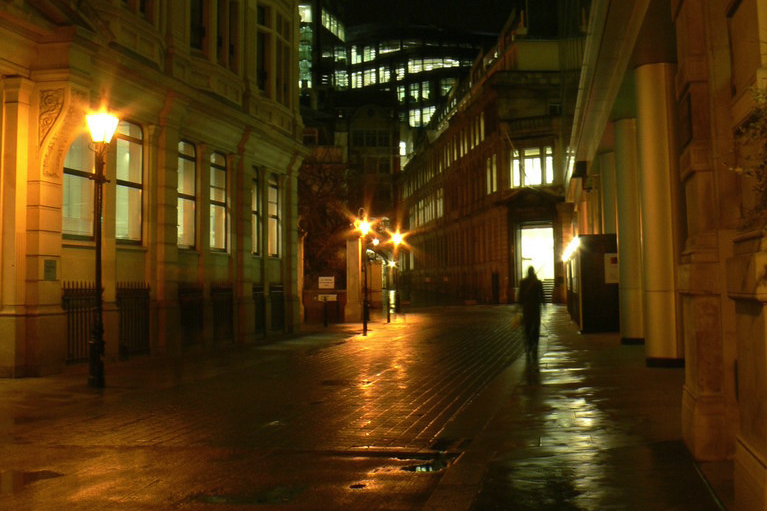
On Throgmorton Avenue is the London office of the world's largest fund manager, BlackRock.

Aside from pensions there are a range of collective investment schemes, including unit trusts, open-ended investment companies, so called "investment trusts", and other mutual funds. In EU and UK law the umbrella term "collective investment scheme" is used to cover a range of legal entities, regardless of their form as trusts, companies or contracts, or a mixture. A "unit trust" is created through a trust deed, and run by a fund manager, where people may buy or sell "units" in a fund that invests in a range of securities. Though constituted as a trust, it is classified by the Corporation Tax Act 2010 section 617 as a company, and units are shares.

An open-ended investment company is a company in which people may also buy and sell shares in the underlying investment fund, which is ultimately held on trust for those investors. "Investment trusts" are not actually trusts at all, rather than limited companies, registered with Companies House, and often used as closed-end investment vehicles that are created with a fixed capital. The most significant is the "real estate investment trusts", a kind of entity with tax breaks that was imported from the US, regulated under the Corporation Tax Act 2010 sections 518 to 609. All securities are regulated by the Financial Conduct Authority to ensure transparency and fairness for investors.

== See also ==
- English contract law
- English land law
- UK constitutional law
- UK insolvency law
- UK company law
- EU law
- Trust law
- United States trust law
- Trust law in Civil law jurisdictions
- Taxation in the United Kingdom
- Indian Trusts Act 1882 (c 2)
- Offshore trust
- Joint wills and mutual wills
