= Swindle v Harrison =

- Court: Court of Appeal
- Citation: [1997] 4 All ER 705

Keywords
- Breach of trust, causation

Swindle v Harrison [1997] 4 All ER 705 is an English trusts law case, concerning remedies for breach of trust.

== Facts ==
Mr Swindle, from a financial advice firm, passed on a bridging loan to Ms Harrison to buy a second home. She already had a mortgage on her own home. He failed to disclose to her that Ms Harrison’s son would be unable to get a loan to help with the purchase, and that Mr Swindle would profit from making the loan. Afterwards, the value of the property dropped. She sued Mr Swindle, and other members of the firm, for the loss of value of the home’s equity, which resulted from the purchase, arguing that following Brickenden v London Loan & Savings Co [1934] 3 DLR 465, Mr Swindle was liable to restore her to the position she was in when the breach occurred, regardless of whether she would still have made the purchase if full disclosure had been made.

== Judgment ==
The Court of Appeal held that the stringent test of causation in Brickenden did not apply to equitable breaches of duty, unless it amounted to fraud. Otherwise it was a "but for" test, like in Mothew. There was no fraud and Ms Harrison would have taken the loan even if all facts had been fully disclosed. She could not recover the drop in house price from the solicitors. Evans LJ said that where a defendant commits a fraudulent breach of duty, the beneficiary can recover damages to be in the position before the breach, in the ‘restitutionary’ measure (misleading!), rather than following the ‘stringent test for causation’. This was not in the position as if a breach had not occurred. Mummery LJ and Hobhouse LJ, held that Target Holdings applies to all breaches of trust, whatever the nature of the duty breached or the manner of its breach, so limiting claims for compensation or restitution when the loss or gain is caused by the breach.

== See also ==
- English trusts law
- Baker v Willoughby [1969] UKHL 8, [1969] 3 All ER 1528
