= Brown v Burdett =

- Court: High Court
- Citation: (1882) 21 Ch D 667

Court membership
- Judge sitting: Bacon VC

Keywords
- Trusts, beneficiary principle

Brown v Burdett (1882) 21 Ch D 667 is an English trusts law case, concerning the ability to create a trust for a purpose that does not benefit any actual person.

== Facts ==
An old lady, Anna Maria Burdett who lived in Gilmorton, Leicestershire demanded in her will that her house be boarded up with "good long nails to be bent down on the inside", but for some reason with her clock remaining inside, for twenty years. She directed her trustees to visit the house every three months to see that the trusts were effectually carried out, and if any trustee neglected this they should lose their entitlements under the will.

== Judgment ==
Bacon VC cancelled the trust altogether, and held that the twenty-year term was invalid for the house, yard, garden, and outbuildings. He said very briefly,

I think I must “unseal” this useless, undisposed of property. There will be a declaration that the house and premises were undisposed of by the will, for the term of twenty years from the testatrix's death.

== See also ==
- English trust law
