= Tang Man Sit v Capacious Investments Ltd =

- Court: Privy Council
- Full case name: The Personal Representatives of Tang Man Sit (deceased) (Tang Wing Hon Alan appointed to represent the Estate of Tang Man Sit, deceased) (Appellant) v Capacious Investments Limited (Respondent)
- Citations: [1995] UKPC 54, [1996] AC 514

Keywords
- Breach of trust, dishonest assistance

Tang Man Sit v Capacious Investments Ltd [1995] UKPC 54 is an English trusts law case, concerning breach of trust and liability for dishonest assistance.

== Facts ==
Before he died, Mr Tang Man Sit signed a deed to assign houses to Capacious Investments Ltd. Later, he let them, without Capacious knowing. Capacious sought a declaration that Mr Tang Wing Hon Alan, Mr Tang's personal representative, should assign back the house free of incumbrances, account for the profits from the lease, and pay the profits over. It should also compensate for losses from use and occupation of the house, with a deduction for profits, and damages to the fall in the house value, as a result of the wrongful occupation.

The Court of Appeal of Hong Kong held that Capacious Investments Ltd had elected to get a remedy for restitution, and so could not recover damages for wrongful occupation as well. Both appealed.

== Judgment ==
Lord Nicholls held that Capacious Investments Ltd could recover damages for loss of market rental value, and loss resulting from overuse and deterioration of the houses. It was true that remedies for loss of profits, and damages for loss of use and occupation were alternatives. However, Capacious had made no election when the judge made the order for profits and damages. It could proceed to claim for an assessment of damages, to see how much that would be, and then make an election.

Lord Keith, Lord Lloyd, Lord Steyn and Hardie Boys J agreed.

== See also ==
- English trusts law
