= Attorney-General v Guardian Newspapers Ltd (No 2) =

UK legal case

- Court: House of Lords
- Citation: [1990] 1 AC 109
- Transcript: judgment

Court membership
- Judges sitting: Lord Keith of Kinkel, Lord Brightman, Lord Griffiths, Lord Goff of Chieveley, Lord Jauncey of Tullichettle

Keywords
- Trusts

Attorney-General v Guardian Newspapers Ltd (No 2) [1990] 1 AC 109 is a UK copyright law and English trusts law case, concerning the confidentiality, profits and copyrights. It established that there can be an injunction and an award of monetary compensation or an account of profits.

== Facts ==
A book was written by an MI5 agent which disclosed secrets belonging to the agency. The publication of the book in the UK would breach the Official Secrets Act 1911 (UK), so instead, it was published in the United States. The Guardian wanted to write about what the book was about.

== Judgment ==
Lord Goff stated that "the copyright in the book, including the film rights, are held by him on constructive trust for the confider".

== See also ==
- English trust law
