= Morley v Morley =

- Court: Court of Chancery
- Citation: (1678) 22 ER 817

Keywords
- Trusts, theft, duty of care

Morley v Morley (1678) 22 ER 817 is an English trusts law case, concerning the duty of care owed by a trustee.

== Facts ==
A trust fund was the victim of a robbery, and £40 of gold was taken.

== Judgment ==
Lord Nottingham LC held that a trustee could not be liable if £40 of the trust fund's gold was robbed, so long as he otherwise performed his duties.

== See also ==
- English trust law
