= Re Astor's Settlement Trusts =

Re Astor’s Settlement Trusts
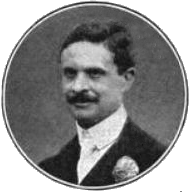
- Court: High Court
- Citation: [1952] Ch 534

Keywords
- Trusts

Re Astor's Settlement Trusts [1952] Ch 534 is an English trusts law case, concerning the principle that non-charitable trusts must be for beneficiaries and not abstract purposes.

== Facts ==
Waldorf Astor, private secretary to David Lloyd George and the husband of Lady Astor, the first woman to take her seat in the House of Commons, died. He had wished to create a trust for the ‘maintenance… of good understanding… between nations’ and ‘the preservation of the independence and integrity of newspapers’ with money from the shares he owned in his newspaper The Observer. The will was challenged on the basis that a trust for an abstract purpose, rather than for real people, could not be valid.

== Judgment ==
Roxburgh J held that the trust failed because of the lack of beneficiaries, and it was uncertain. He said the following.

But if the purposes are not charitable, great difficulties arise both in theory and in practice. In theory, because having regard to the historical origins of equity it is difficult to visualize the growth of equitable obligations which nobody can enforce, and in practice, because it is not possible to contemplate with equanimity the creation of large funds devoted to non-charitable purposes which no court and no department of state can control, or in the case of maladministration reform.... ... A court of equity does not recognise as valid a trust which it cannot both enforce and control...

== See also ==
- English trust law
