= Jobholder =

Employment status in UK

A jobholder is a new type of employment status in UK labour law, that was introduced by the Pensions Act 2008, sections 1 and 88. Jobholders are entitled under the Act to be automatically enrolled in an occupational pension.

== Meaning ==
Section 1 of the Act reads:

(1) For the purposes of this Part a jobholder is a worker—

(a) who is working or ordinarily works in Great Britain under the worker's contract,
(b) who is aged at least 16 and under 75, and
(c) to whom qualifying earnings are payable by the employer in the relevant pay reference period (see sections 13 and 15).

In turn, section 88 defines a worker in the same way as the Employment Rights Act 1996 section 230, as someone either with a "contract of employment" (on which, see Autoclenz Ltd v Belcher) or someone who personally performs work but is not a client or a customer.

== Consequence ==
The concept of jobholder was a fifth type of employment status in UK labour law. It joins,

- "employee" under ERA 1996 section 230, see Autoclenz Ltd v Belcher
- "worker" under ERA 1996 section 230
- "employment relationship" under EU law
- "worker" under EU law, see Pfeiffer v Deutsches Rotes Kreuz

In the ERA 1996 section 205A, the government also created a new "employee shareholder" status, although the takeup of this was so poor that it has no practical relevance.

== See also ==
- European labour law
- UK labour law
