= Constructive trusts in English law =

Form of trust created by the English law courts

Constructive trusts in English law are a form of trust created by the English law courts primarily where the defendant has dealt with property in an "unconscionable manner"—but also in other circumstances. The property is held in "constructive trust" for the harmed party, obliging the defendant to look after it. The main factors that lead to a constructive trust are unconscionable dealings with property, profits from unlawful acts, and unauthorised profits by a fiduciary. Where the owner of a property deals with it in a way that denies or impedes the rights of some other person over that property, the courts may order that owner to hold it in constructive trust. Where someone profits from unlawful acts, such as murder, fraud, or bribery, these profits may also be held in constructive trust. The most common of these is bribery, which requires that the person be in a fiduciary office. Certain offices, such as those of trustee and company director, are always fiduciary offices. Courts may recognise others where the circumstances demand it. Where someone in a fiduciary office makes profits from their duties without the authorisation of that office's beneficiaries, a constructive trust may be imposed on those profits; there is a defence where the beneficiaries have authorised such profits. The justification here is that a person in such an office must avoid conflicts of interest, and be held to account should he fail to do so.

Other types of constructive trust not relating to unconscionable dealings are constructive trusts over property, mutual wills, and arguably secret trusts. Where property is sold or transferred, the signing of an agreement to do so automatically transfers the equitable interest to the buyer or transferee; until the property itself is transferred, it is deemed to be held on constructive trust for the recipient. Mutual wills are irrevocable wills made by multiple people to come into force at the writer's death; similarly, these are also considered constructive trusts. Secret trusts are the subject of much debate over their classification, but one theory holds that they are constructive in nature. Related to constructive trusts are constructive trustees, or trustees de son tort; these are where "one, not being a trustee and not having authority from a trustee, takes upon himself to intermeddle with trust matters or to do acts characteristic of the office of trustee". Where their actions are reckless or dishonest, the court makes that person a constructive trustee, forcing them to account to the beneficiaries for any loss suffered and look after the trust property in their possession.

== Definition ==
A constructive trust is a trust the courts impose whenever the defendant knows that he has dealt with property in an "unconscionable manner", such as stealing it, possessing it via fraud, and accepting a bribe while in occupation of a fiduciary office. The constructive trust is intended to take the property from the defendant's control, preventing them from causing additional harm with it. It thus acts regardless of the parties' intentions. In Paragon Finance plc v DB Thakerar & Co, Millett LJ defined a constructive trust as a trust that "arises by operation of law whenever the circumstances are such that it would be unconscionable for the owner of property (usually but not necessarily the legal estate) to assert his own beneficial interest in the property and deny the beneficial interest of another". Essentially, a constructive trust arises whenever an owner either ignores, or interferes, with the rights of another person with an interest in that property. There is a distinction between personal and proprietary rights to property. A constructive trust normally gives a proprietary right to the beneficiary that can be enforced on any other person. The alternative (a personal right) merely gives the beneficiary the right to recover money equivalent to the value of the property.

Constructive trusts, under Section 53(2) of the Law of Property Act 1925, do not require any particular formalities on creation, unlike express trusts. For them to be valid, however, the defendant (or "trustee" of the constructive trust) must know that he has dealt with property in an "unconscionable manner". In Westdeutsche Landesbank v Islington London Borough Council, Lord Browne-Wilkinson wrote that "Since the equitable jurisdiction to enforce trusts depends upon the conscience of the holder of the legal interest being affected, he cannot be a trustee of the property if and so long as he is ignorant of the facts alleged to affect his conscience".

== Reasons ==
=== Unconscionable dealings with property ===
When the owner of property deals with it in such a way as to deny or impede the rights of some other person over that property, the courts order that owner to hold it on constructive trust. For trusts of real property, constructive trusts may arise in one of three situations. First, when the parties form an agreement to buy the land, or show "common intention" by jointly contributing to the price or mortgage of a property, as in Lloyds Bank plc v Rosset. Second, when a contract to transfer rights is agreed to, the equitable interest is automatically transferred, something that also applies to personal property. Third, a constructive trust may be created where there are several parties interested in commercially exploiting land, and some refrain from doing so due to an agreement with the defendant, as in Pallant v Morgan. In Banner Homes Group plc v Luff Developments Ltd, it was decided that this principle applies even when no binding contract has been signed, and the claimant has refrained due to ongoing negotiations with the defendant.

Another "more contentious" form of constructive trust is in a situation where the claimant has "done everything necessary". Where the owner of property intends to transfer property to another, completes their side of the transfer and the transfer then fails, this property is held on constructive trust as in Re Rose. In relation to personal property, a constructive trust is created over a fund created to protect pre-payments to a company in the event of that company going into insolvency. In several situations, companies, knowing they are in dire financial straits, have put money paid to them by customers for products not yet delivered in a separate bank account to protect it in the event of insolvency. This causes theoretical problems; it is "difficult to square the conscionability of holding the money on trust for the customers with the pari passu principle in insolvency law that no unsecured creditor should be given an advantage over any other unsecured creditor".

=== Profits from unlawful acts ===
Where acts lead to profit and are illegal, under either English criminal law or an established legal principle, equity puts any property acquired through these acts into a constructive trust. The most common type of trust here is one resulting from bribery; where somebody in a fiduciary office makes unlawful profit, that money is held on constructive trust for the beneficiaries of his office. In Attorney General for Hong Kong v Reid, the Director of Public Prosecutions in Hong Kong accepted bribes to not prosecute certain people. The court held that this was a violation of fiduciary duty, and put the money on constructive trust. An issue with this principle is that the position of Director of Public Prosecutions is not normally understood to be a fiduciary one. Rather, the courts are using fiduciary duties as a method of punishing the defendant; Alastair Hudson writes that they are "as concerned to punish the wrongdoer as to protect rights in property".

Whether or not someone is a fiduciary depends on their position. Trustees, company directors, agents and business partners are all fiduciaries, as in Yugraneft v Abramovich, but other positions may be recognised by the court if the misuse of powers in a particular circumstance renders them so, as in Reid. In Brink's Ltd v Abu-Saleh (No. 3), a security guard who was bribed to give information on a company's security systems, allowing a gang of armed robbers to burgle their warehouse, was found to be in a fiduciary position. While a security guard would not normally be a fiduciary due to not holding a senior enough role, in relation to security arrangements the guard would be found to be acting in a fiduciary capacity. Bribes may also be synonymous with "secret commissions", where somebody is given an undisclosed "kickback".

Murder makes the killer a constructive trustee of whatever property they acquire as a result. This applies to murder, as in In the Estate of Crippen, inciting someone to murder, as in Evans v Evans, and causing death by reckless driving, as in R v Seymour (Edward). In Re K, it was confirmed that involuntary manslaughter does not require constructive trusts, and neither do situations where there is a successful plea of insanity, as in found in Section 1 of the Criminal Procedure (Insanity) Act 1964. Curiously, there is no requirement that the defendant be found guilty in criminal proceedings; in Re Sigsworth, it was decided that claims can be brought without criminal proceedings having taken place providing the defendant is held up to the criminal standards of guilt in the equity case.

In cases of fraud, the same principle applies; the property is held by the fraudster on constructive trust for the original owner, unless the original owner was involved in the fraud, as in Lonrho plc v Fayed (No. 2). An exception to this principle is fraudulent misrepresentation, where the courts disagree over whether it immediately forms a constructive trust or requires action by the victim. In Collings v Lee, an estate agent transferred property to a non-existent purchaser (in reality an alias) and then claimed that as he was not the transferee, he did not have to pay the vendors; it was held that this fraudulent misrepresentation meant he held the property on constructive trust. However, in Lonrho, Millett J held that "A contract obtained by fraudulent misrepresentation is voidable, not void, even in equity. The representee may elect to avoid it, but until he does so, the representor is not a constructive trustee of the property transferred pursuant to the contact, and no fiduciary relationship exists between him and the representee".

=== Fiduciary making unauthorised profits ===
Where a person in a fiduciary office earns unauthorised profits as a result of their position, this money is held on constructive trust. This principle originated with Keech v Sandford, and the rule was first fully defined in Bray v Ford, where Lord Herschell said that:

It is an inflexible rule of the court of equity that a person in a fiduciary position...is not, unless otherwise [authorised,] entitled to make a profit; he is not allowed to put himself in a position where his interest and duty conflict. It does not appear to me that this rule is, as had been said, founded upon principles of morality. I regard it rather as based on the consideration that, human nature being what it is, there is danger, in such circumstances, of the person holding a fiduciary position being swayed by interest rather than by duty, and thus prejudicing those whom he was bound to protect. It has, therefore, been deemed expedient to lay down this positive rule.

The questions then are fourfold; what is the justification for such a constructive trust, how can authorisation be acquired, who does the fiduciary owe duties to, and what are the remedies for unauthorised profit-making. The main case on this is Boardman v Phipps, where the House of Lords espoused two possible justifications:

- The first one is that it is a strict rule that a fiduciary cannot allow a conflict of interest. As such, if a fiduciary does do so, he is required to account to the beneficiaries of his office, regardless of whether or not he has acted in bad faith.
- The second justification is one given by Lords Hodson and Guest in Boardman, which concerned the use of confidential information by a trustee for the trustee's personal gain. Hodson and Guest held that where such a situation arises, the constructive trust is justified not only to avoid conflicts of interest but also because such information is trust property, and using it for personal gain is misuse.

There is no requirement that the profit be directly made from the fiduciary position, merely in a way that causes a conflict between the fiduciary's personal interests and his duties. If a trustee was informed by the trust's stockbroker that only one parcel of highly sought-after stocks remained and chose to purchase it for himself rather than for the trust, he would be taking advantage of the trust and causing a conflict of interest. On the second issue, Boardman confirmed a defence of authorisation. If the fiduciary has informed the beneficiaries that he is acting on his own behalf, and has received permission to do so, the property would not have been held on constructive trust. The third issue is who does the fiduciary owe duties to. In Boardman the case was concerning a trust, and it was held that the duties were towards the beneficiaries. Section 170 of the Companies Act 2006 provides that in situations concerning companies, the duties of the directors and other fiduciaries are to that company.

Where a fiduciary has made unauthorised profits, the remedy is for those profits to be held on constructive trust. If that profit is no longer available, the fiduciary is "liable to account" to the beneficiaries. In Sinclair Investment Holdings SA v Versailles Trade Finance (No. 3), Rimer J explained that this meant the beneficiaries acquire rights over those profits, and the trustee must pay that money or the money's worth back to the beneficiaries. If the profits are mixed with other money or used to purchase property, the beneficiary may trace that property and claim it. Further expansion of the principle was later given in FHR European Ventures LLP v Cedar Capital Partners LLC.

=== Constructive trusts relating to property ===
Many constructive trusts relate to the transfer of property. Those trusts over homes are known as trusts of common intention, and relate exclusively to family homes. In Lloyds Bank v Rosset, the House of Lords set out the circumstances in which a trust of common intention can arise. Firstly, where the parties demonstrate that there was an agreement formed before the acquisition of the property. Secondly, where the parties contribute to the purchase price or mortgage payments and therefore practically demonstrate a common intention to claim an equitable interest; this second form is similar to one form of resulting trust Common intention trusts grant a claimant an equitable right to the home, calculated as a proportion of the total value that corresponds to their financial contributions. The second occasion on which a constructive trust may arise over property is where a piece of property is sold or transferred. The contract transfers the equitable interest from the original owner to the other party, which takes place through a constructive trust. This originated with Chinn v Collins, where it was decided that the creation of such a contract automatically passes the equitable interest to the buyer, assuming the contract can be completed. Until it is completed, that property is held on constructive trust by the seller for the benefit of the buyer. This applies to both personal and real property, with additional rules for the transfer of real property (land). Section 2 of the Law of Property (Miscellaneous Provisions) Act 1989 provides that the contract must be in writing, which is not a requirement for the transfer of personal property.

=== Other ===
Constructive trusts also arise with mutual wills; wills created by two or more people at the same time, with the intention that the wills are completely binding. Normal wills can be altered or revoked; when one signatory to a mutual will dies, the will irrevocably binds the other signatories. This is dependent on several things. Firstly, there must be evidence of a contract between the signatories demonstrating that each would make a will in a certain form, and neither would revoke it, as in Walters v Olins. Secondly, the will must make it clear that it is to apply to the other party after death. Until a death occurs, the arrangement is simply a contract and has no effect in equity.

Secret trusts are sometimes considered constructive trusts. They do not follow the Wills Act 1837; a requirement for express trusts. The argument is that it is such trusts are intended to prevent fraud by statute. Under this rule, secret trusts would be constructive trusts; the reason they do not have to follow the Wills Act is because they are created by the courts. This is a difficult argument with which to justify half-secret trusts, because since the will mentions the trust, fraud is not directly possible. A more modern argument is that secret trusts are independent and operate outside the will. The trust was created by the donor and trustee during the donor's life, and simply not constituted until his death; it does not have to follow the Wills Act, because it was not created by a will. This view was expressed by Megarry VC in Re Snowden, where he said "The whole basis of secret trusts...is that they operate outside the will, changing nothing that is written in it, and allowing it to operate according to its tenor, but then fastening a trust on to the property in the hands of the recipient". This suggests that secret trusts are not constructive trusts but rather express trusts.

== Constructive trustees ==
When non-trustees interfere with the workings of an express trust to such an extent as to harm it, they can be deemed constructive trustees, or trustees de son tort. In Mara v Browne, Smith LJ stated that "if one, not being a trustee and not having authority from a trustee, takes upon himself to intermeddle with trust matters or to do acts characteristic of the office of trustee, he may therefore make himself what is called in law trustee of his own wrong - ie, a trustee de son tort, or, as it is also termed, a constructive trustee". For someone to be made a constructive trustee, they must have had the property in their possession or control before the application, and have acted in a dishonest or reckless way. If found liable, the constructive trustee is held to account personally to repay any loss suffered by the trust fund, and must keep that trust property in his possession.

== Bibliography ==
- Edwards, Richard; Nigel Stockwell (2007). Trusts and Equity (8th ed.). Pearson Longman. ISBN 978-1-4058-4684-4.
- Hudson, Alastair (2009). Equity and Trusts (6th ed.). Routledge-Cavendish. ISBN 0-415-49771-X.
