= Secret trusts in English law =

Trust that comes into force after death

In English law, secret trusts are a class of trust defined as an arrangement between a testator and a trustee, made to come into force after death, that aims to benefit a person without having been written in a formal will. The property is given to the trustee in the will, and he would then be expected to pass it on to the real beneficiary. For these to be valid, the person seeking to enforce the trust must prove that the testator intended to form a trust, that this intention was communicated to the trustee, and that the trustee accepted his office. There are two types of secret trust — fully secret and half-secret. A fully secret trust is one with no mention in the will whatsoever. In the case of a half-secret trust, the face of the will names the trustee as trustee, but does not give the trust's terms, including the beneficiary. The most important difference lies in communication of the trust: the terms of a half-secret trust must be communicated to the trustee before the execution of the will, whereas in the case of a fully secret trust the terms may be communicated after the execution of the will, as long as this is before the testator's death.

Secret trusts do not comply with the formality requirements (such as witnessing) laid down in the Wills Act 1837. Despite this, the courts have chosen to uphold them as valid. Although various justifications have been given for this, they are generally categorised as either based on preventing fraud, or as regarding secret trusts as outside (dehors) the operation of the Wills Act. The first is considered the traditional approach – if the courts do not recognise secret trusts, the trustee given the property in the will would be able to keep it for himself, committing fraud. The fraud theory utilises the equitable maxim that "equity will not allow a statute to be used as a cloak for fraud". A more modern view is that secret trusts exist outside the will altogether, and thus do not have to comply with it. Accepting this theory would undermine the operation of the Wills Act, since the Wills Act is designed to cover all testamentary dispositions. To avoid this problem, one approach has been to reclassify the secret trust as inter vivos ("between the living") but this creates other problems. There have also been attempts to conclude that half-secret trusts rest on a different basis to fully secret trusts, although this has been disapproved by the House of Lords, primarily on practical grounds.

This debate is also of importance when classifying the trust as either constructive or express, a matter of considerable debate. On one view, if the traditional theory is correct, secret trusts are created by the courts, and are thus constructive; if the more modern view is correct, the trusts exist without the court's permission, and are express trusts. However, a secret trust does not have to obey the separate formalities of the Law of Property Act 1925, even when it concerns land and one solution to this problem is to consider them constructive. Some commentators believe that half-secret trusts may fall into a different category to fully secret trusts in this regard.

== Definition ==
A secret trust is an arrangement between a testator and a trustee to benefit a person without having to specify that person in a will. The trustee is transferred property under the terms of the will which he or she then holds on trust for others.

The courts recognise two forms of secret trust. Fully secret trusts are trusts not referred to at all on the face of the will. Instead, an agreement made between the testator and trustees elsewhere. The trustee will instead be named only a beneficiary. In the case of a half-secret trust, the fact that the beneficiary holds as trustee only is declared on the face of the will, but not the other terms of the trust.

Alastair Hudson, Professor of Equity and Law at Queen Mary, University of London, suggests the potential for a third class of secret trust. This is where the dying person is encouraged not to make a will so that his property passes to the next-of-kin, on the agreement that the next-of-kin give effect to his wishes via a secret trust. If this is the case, the next-of-kin would be obliged to hold the property on trust and fulfil the dying person's wishes.

A secret trust must be contrasted with merely placing a moral obligation upon the beneficiary to deal with the legacy in particular way (as in Re Snowden) and must impose a binding obligation, without discretion to act within its terms or not.

== Justification ==
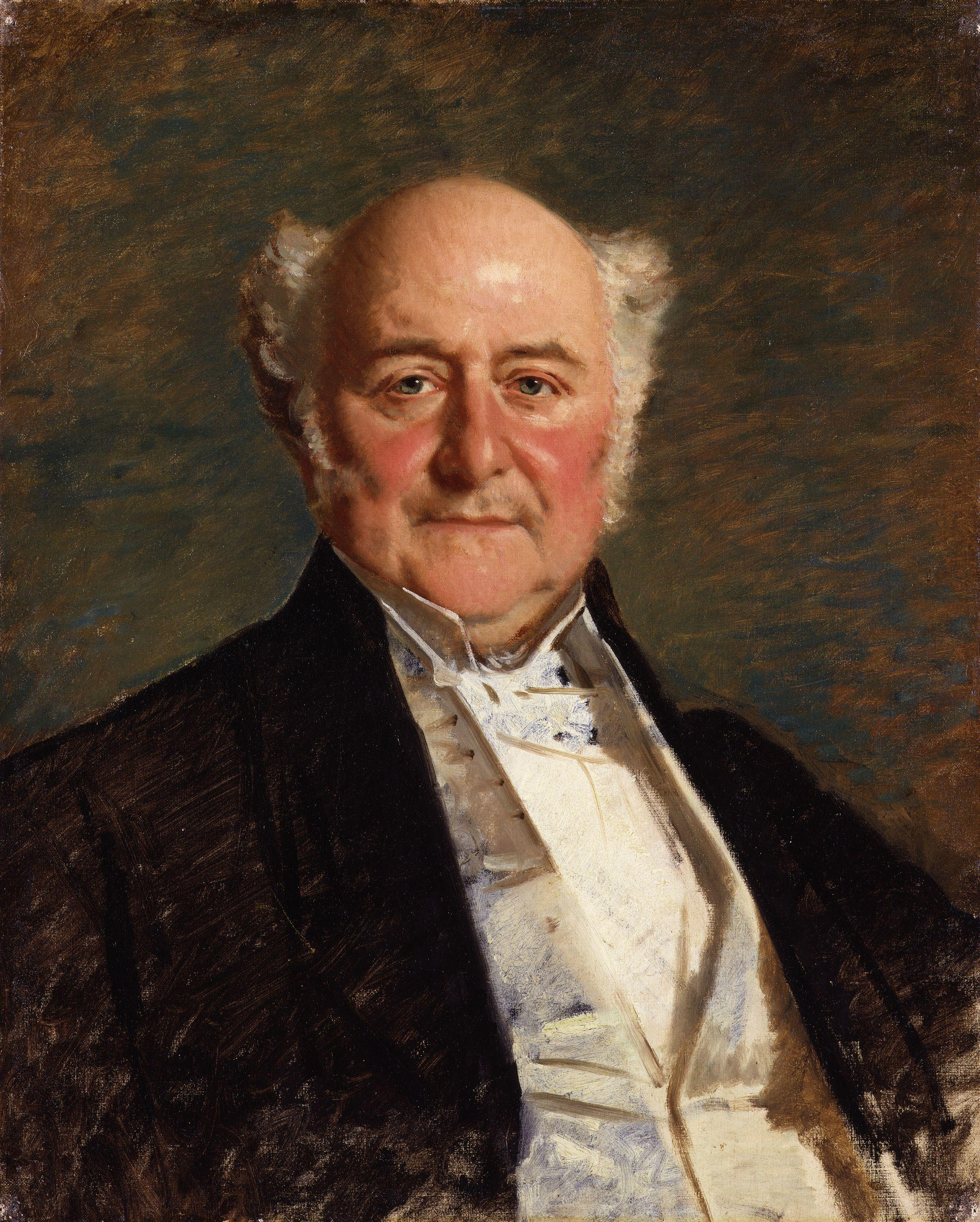
Lord Westbury, who gave the traditional justification for secret trusts in McCormick v Grogan.

The secret trust has proved difficult to reconcile with section 9 of the Wills Act 1837, which provides that a will is only valid when:

(a) it is in writing, and signed by the testator, or by some other person in his presence and by his direction; and
(b) it appears that the testator intended by his signature to give effect to the will; and
(c) the signature is made or acknowledged by the testator in the presence of two or more witnesses present at the same time; and
(d) each witness either -

(i) attests and signs the will; or
(ii) acknowledges his signature, in the presence of the testator (but not necessarily in the presence of any other witnesses).

As such, such trusts are not enforceable because they are invalid. Equity has been willing to accept their validity in the common law to prevent the trustee committing fraud and keeping the property; justifications for this acceptance are debated.

In practical terms, there are several reasons why admitting the language of fraud to justify a fully secret trust, but not a half-secret trust, would be sub-optimal. This is considered one principal reason why the court in Blackwell v Blackwell established that both types of secret trust shared a single justification. A half-secret trust appears closer to fulfilling the formality requirements as laid down in the Wills Act, so the conclusion that it is less likely to be enforced seems contradictory. Also, such a rule would encourage fully secret trusts, with a wider possibility for fraud. It would also spark considerable litigation on whether a particular clause resulted in a fully secret or half-secret trust. Thus it may be argued that despite the difficulties, a half-secret trust should be enforced if fully secret trusts are.

=== Fraud theory ===
The secret trust was originally conceived to prevent fraud enabled by statute or the common law, in line with the equitable maxim that "equity will not allow a statute to be used as a cloak for fraud". The "fraud" referred to is the denial of the existence of the trust by the intended trustee of the will, thus allowing him to apply it for his own purposes. Thus in McCormick v Grogan, Lord Westbury justified secret trusts, saying:

the court has, from a very early period, decided that even an Act of Parliament shall not be used as an instrument as fraud; and that equity will fasten on the individual who gets a title under that Act, and impose upon him a personal obligation, because he applies the Act as an instrument for accomplishing a fraud. In this way, a court of equity has dealt with the Statute of Frauds, and in this manner, also, it deals with the Statute of Wills.

There have been two grounds on which this rule has been based. The narrower ground is that the trustee should be debarred from denying the existence of the trust because of his wrongful conduct at the time he made the undertaking, as identified by Lord Westbury in McCormick v Grogan. The wider ground extends to attempting to renege on the promise made during the testator's lifetime, even when his intention at the time of making the promise may have been to fulfill the testator's wishes. The wider ground appears to have been adopted by the Court of Appeal in Bannister v Bannister. D. R. Hodge has argued that "acceptance of the narrower view would not only impose upon a person seeking to establish a secret trust the heavy onus of showing at what point of time the secret trustee decided to resile from his promise, but would also make the validity of the secret trust dependent upon what is in fact an irrelevant consideration".

Since allowing the trustee of the will to retain the property is at the heart of the "fraud", it is not clear why courts have considered the appropriate remedy to recognise a trust on behalf of others, rather than a resulting trust in favour of the estate (the residuary legatee). To this it has been argued that, since the testator is dead, a resulting trust is often reversing the beneficiary's claims since the testator cannot make any attempt to revoke or undo the trust terms. Save in case of a will and except the plain reading of clauses within the will, having admitted external evidence as operating under the proper introduction of the doctrine of incorporation by reference, a conclusive claim that it is necessary to observe further the formality requirement cannot be disregarded, because Will Act clearly set out the requirements of property transfer in case of failure has to be based on result trust that a party ultimately intended. The enforcement of the secret trust as a response to perceived fraud also opens the door to a further form of deceit, whereby the trustee funnels the trust monies to the wrong beneficiary.

Two further problems are apparent when considering the fraud theory in the context of half-secret trusts. Since the will mentions the trust, it is impossible for the trustee to deny the existence of the trust. Whether or not the intended beneficiaries can be ascertained, in case of inter vivo transaction, the trust-beneficiary cannot benefit personally and any meaning of fraud seems apparent because fraud requires an intention to act dishonestly. It appears to create an alternative route: the trustee may bring false oral testimony in favour of a third party who was not the intended beneficiary, a party that cannot benefit if the law did not uphold half-secret trusts in conclusion but it could operate without court's interference. Secondly, a half-secret trust ought to fail for uncertainty, being a trust with no terms, with a resulting trust to the residuary legatee. Under the rule of three uncertainties in private trust, half or fully secretly trust ought to fail because of lack of intentional element. Those in favour of its enforcement must therefore observe the imposition of resulting trust as required under three certainties rule, and the "fraud" theory seems insufficient to do so, since there is no sublet and significant impact for dishonest act and if otherwise fraud can be upheld; and therefore no conduct on the part of the trustee to warrant it. The deceased's intended disposition remains imperfectly constituted and the intended beneficiary's claim is thus weaker than the residuary legatee's. Whilst one response has been to suggest that whether a resulting trust or enforcement of the secret trust is most appropriate remedy is a question for the courts, subsequent cases have typically defined the automatic resulting trust, as in this case, as operating as a matter of law and not a question for the courts, and this should be settled by parliament legislation.

Alastair Hudson has also argued that the fraud argument is significantly flawed. The theory suggests that liability for the property comes about from fraud; in fact, liability comes about as soon as the trustee accepts the property to hold on trust, and so the fraud theory is not necessary to bind the trustee's hands.

Based on the fraud theory, secret trusts are sometimes classified as constructive trusts; the reason they do not have to follow the Wills Act 1837 is because they are created by the courts.

=== "Outside (dehors) the will" theory ===
A more modern argument is that secret trusts are independent and operate outside the will. This would mean that the trust is not testamentary in nature but falls within the ordinary equitable jurisdiction of the court. The trust was created by the donor and trustee during the donor's life, and simply not constituted until his death; it does not have to follow the Wills Act, because it was not created by a will. This view was expressed by Megarry VC in Re Snowden, where he said "The whole basis of secret trusts... is that they operate outside the will, changing nothing that is written in it, and allowing it to operate according to its tenor, but then fastening a trust on to the property in the hands of the recipient". This suggests that secret trusts are not constructive trusts but rather express trusts.

It has been suggested that the dehors theory is based on detective drafting of the Wills Act. In particular, whilst the term "will" is commonly used to refer to a specific document, the Wills Act is designed to cover almost all documents except rules on public trust and secret trust that are to take effect after the testator's death. Indeed, the formality requirements of the Wills Act created the need for a set of prima facie documents, like the one commonly referred to. Therefore, to refer to an arrangement as dehors the Wills Act because it is not a prima facie reference to the document is incorrect. The response has been to view the secret trust as a disposition inter vivos ("between the living") rather than testamentary under exception. Although the testator is unlikely to consider the trust having come into existence at the time of the will upon his death, whether a disposition is arguably though less convincingly regarded as an inter vivos is a question for the courts as well as parliament. However, other types of inter vivos trust are incapable of binding after-acquired property or operating so as to, whether automatically, semi-automatically or no automatism at all, bind such property as and when it is received. No separate declaration of trust is required in the case of property acquired after the execution of a will for it to form part of a secret trust. Looking at the definition of a "testamentary disposition" and "inter vivo trust" as applied in other sorts of cases is inconclusive.

== Classification ==
Whether secret trusts are express or constructive trusts is unclear. Snell's Equity includes them in its section on express trusts, as does Underhill and Hayton, although both opine that they are better classified as express trust with constructive elements.

53(1)(b) of the Law of Property Act 1925 requires that "a declaration of trust respecting any land or any interest therein must be manifested and proved by some writing signed by some person who is able to declare such trust or by his will". section 53(1)(a) said "no interest in land can be created or disposed of except by writing signed by the person creating or conveying the same, or by his agent thereunto lawfully authorised in writing, or by will, or by operation of law". Two cases, Re Baillie and Ottaway v Norman, have concerned secret trusts over land. In neither case the formality requirements are said to be neglected, but neither judgment expressly considered why 53(1)(a) and 53(1)(b) made an impact that a prima facie express trust could be set up. This has been used to be an argument that secret trusts are constructive but in light of both cases it appears not. However, an express trust may still be exempted from the requirements of 53(1)(a) and 53(1)(b) by a separate application of the equitable maxim "equity will not allow a statute to be used as a cloak for fraud" – the fraud would be for the trustee to deny the existence of the secret trust, but this time the statute concerned would be the Law of Property Act, a line of reasoning dependent upon the case of Rochefoucauld v Boustead. Also, the correct interpretation of secret trust in light of "au dehor" theory strongly affirms that the secret trust can operate outside the Law of Property Act and still be an express trust.

Some authors place fully secret and half-secret trusts in different categories, including Alastair Hudson and Lionel Astor Sheridan. To this it has been argued that, if the "outside the will" theory is the true basis for the secret trust, whether the mention of the existence of the trust on the face of the will should affect its nature. In Hudson's opinion, fully secret trusts are constructive trusts, because they exist to prevent fraud. But sometimes they are express trusts, if "au dehor" doctrine is concerned. Half-secret trusts are constructive trust, because their mention in wills makes fraud unlikely; they are instead in line with a constructive notice, e.g. the use of sealed document. The House of Lords in Blackwell v Blackwell, however, considered the half-secret trust to have the same basis as the fully secret trust.

== Fully secret trusts ==
Fully secret trusts are awkward because of the lack of evidence pertaining to their existence and terms. In Ottaway v Norman, Brightman J set out the test for proving the existence of a fully secret trust. This is:

It will be convenient to call the person on whom such a trust is imposed the 'primary donee', and the beneficiary under that trust the 'secondary donee'. The essential elements which must be proved to exist are: (i) the intention of the testator to subject the primary donee to an obligation in favour of the secondary donee; (ii) communication of that intention to the primary donee; and (iii) the acceptance of that obligation by the primary donee either expressly or by acquiescence. It is immaterial whether these elements precede or succeed the will of the donor.

For a fully secret trust to be valid, therefore, it must be proved that there was intention, that this was communicated to the trustee, and that the trustee accepted his obligations. Intention is one of the three certainties, and applies to fully secret trusts in the same way as it does to other express trusts.

The second requirement is that both the secret trust and its terms are communicated to the trustee. This may be done after the writing of the will, as long as it is prior to death; without it, the secret trust is void. Exactly what must be communicated depends on the nature of the property and trust; if there are multiple beneficiaries for example, this will need to be communicated. In Re Boyes, Kay J came to the conclusion that communication requires allowing the trustee the chance to refuse his office; as such, it cannot be done after death. Lastly, the office of trustee must be accepted by the trustee. The two ways this can be done were laid out by Wood VC in Wallgrave v Tebbs, when he said:

Where a person, knowing that a testator is making a disposition in his favour intends it to be applied for purposes other than his own benefit, either expressly promises, or by silence implies, that he will carry on the testator's intention into effect, and the property is left to him upon the faith of that promise or understanding, it is in effect a case of trust".

Acceptance, therefore, can be communicated in one of two ways; either by the trustee directly stating his acceptance, or by implying it through not declining.

If a secret trust cannot be established, the beneficiary will hold outright. If a secret trust can be shown, but not its terms (or communication post-dated the testator's death), then the would-be trustee will hold on resulting trust for the testator's estate.

== Half-secret trusts ==
With a half-secret trust, the fact that the beneficiary of the will holds as trustee only is declared on the face of the will, but not the other terms of the trust. This must go further than the mere "hope" that the beneficiary (again I believe this should read "trustee" - the beneficiary is the passive party to a trust) of the will, will act in accordance with its terms. The requirements for a half-secret trust to be valid are similar to those for fully secret trusts, and were laid out in Blackwell v Blackwell, where a testator gave five trustees pieces of property, instructing them (in the will) to hold on to this property as they had been asked. Prior to the testator's death, the trustees had all been told what to do with the property. Lord Sumner said that:

The necessary elements [to create a half-secret trust], on which the question turns, are intention, communication and acquiescence. The testator intends his absolute gift to be employed as he and not as the donee desires; he tells the proposed donee of this intention and, either by express promise or by the tacit promise, which is satisfied by acquiescence, the proposed donee encourages him to bequeath the money on the faith that his intention will be carried out.

The most important distinction between half-secret and fully secret trusts concerns the communication of the terms of the trust. Communication must be either at or before the execution of the will, in contrast to fully secret trusts, when it may postdate the will so long as it predates the death of the testator. In Blackwell, Viscount Sumner said that: "[a] testator cannot reserve to himself a power of making future unwitnessed dispositions by merely naming a trustee and leaving the purposes of the trust to be supplied afterwards", a passage given its traditional interpretation in cases such as Re Keen, becoming a "cornerstone" of what has become known as the 'prior acceptance rule'. Although that interpretation has been confirmed as the law in further cases, Professor John Mee said that Viscount Sumner suggested that acceptance by the trustee (whether of a half-secret or fully secret trust) must take place within the testator's lifetime before the execution of the will. Mee hoped the High Court would make clarification on whether prior acceptance exists and therefore the law regarding acceptance should be different between half-secret and fully secret trusts. Acceptance of the half-secret trust is not entirely different to fully secret trusts but there are subtle and decisive variations; it can be communicated either directly, or tacitly.

The failure of a half-secret trust, such as where the beneficiaries of the trust cannot be shown, or communication is not at or before the execution of the will.

== Practice ==
There are a variety of practical rules in these trusts' use, which span both fully secret and half-secret trusts. If a testator alters the terms of the trust or the trust property, he must inform the intended trustee; if not, as in Re Colin Cooper, the trustee will be permitted to keep the newly added property. Where the trustees are co-owners of the property, informing them of the trust's terms or amendments becomes complicated. If they hold the property as tenants-in-common, only those tenants who were informed of the trust are bound to follow it. Where they hold the property as joint tenants, they are all bound by the trust if even one tenant accepts it before the execution of the will. Where they hold the property as joint tenants and some accept it, but only after the execution of the will, only those who accepted it are bound. This area has been called "rather illogical".

The result of the emergence of the "outside the will" theory has been seen with respect to witnesses to the will. Section 15 of the Wills Act states that any person "[attesting] the execution of any will to whom or to whose wife or husband any beneficial [legacy]... shall be thereby given or made, such [legacy]... shall, so far only as concerns such person attesting the execution of such will, or the wife or husband of such person, or any person claiming under such person or wife or husband, be utterly null and void". In Re Young, an attesting witness was the beneficiary of a secret trust. The court decided that "the Wills Act 1837 had nothing to do with it" and the secret trust valid. The effect of the Wills Act 1968 has been to allow the trustee of a half-secret trust to attest the will and this may also apply to the fully secret trust.

Where a beneficiary under a secret trust predeceases the testator, his or her personal representative will inherit instead, as in Re Gardner. If the gift had been made directly as part of testator's will it would have lapsed and formed part of his or her residuary estate by the beneficiary's death, but since he or she inherits as a result of a separate secret trust that rule does not apply. Where the trustee of a secret trust predeceases the testator, or renounces his trusteeship before the death of the testator, the position of the secret trust in unclear. In the case of a half-secret trust, the trust ought to be good on the basis that "equity will not allow a trust to fail for want of a trustee". Of a fully secret trust, it was indicated by Lord Buckmaster in Blackwell v Blackwell that such a trust might not fail: "the [trustee-]legatee might defeat the whole purpose by renouncing the legacy... I entertain no doubt that the Court, having once admitted the evidence of the trust, would interfere to prevent its defeat." Against this, it has been argued that the arrangement is the result of a personal obligation as thus fails if renounced or if the trustee predeceases the testator.

Evidential issues also exist. Because secret trusts are by definition secret, they are difficult to prove in court. The parol evidence rule states that where there is written evidence, oral testimony cannot be introduced to the court if it contradicts that evidence. Since secret trusts are oral and normally exist outside of the will (a written document) this causes problems. In Re Keen, the issue came up, and the Court of Appeal decided that the parol evidence rule extended to secret trusts, and such trusts could not be enforced if they contradicted written documents. More generally, the problem is proving that the testator intended to create a trust. As in McCormick v Grogan, the standard is high; the person trying to enforce the trust must show "most clearly and distinctly" that it exists.

== Bibliography ==
- Critchley, P (October 1999). "Instruments of Fraud, Testamentary Dispositions and the Doctrine of Secret Trusts". Law Quarterly Review. 115.
- Edwards, Richard; Stockwell, Nigel (2007). Trusts and Equity (8th ed.). Pearson Longman. ISBN 978-1-4058-4684-4.
- Hodge, D. (1980). "Secret Trusts: The Fraud Theory Revisited". Conveyancer and Property Lawyer: 341–351.
- Hudson, Alastair (2009). Equity and Trusts (6th ed.). Routledge-Cavendish. ISBN 978-0-415-49771-8.
- Mee, John (1992). "Half-secret trusts in England and Ireland". Conveyancer and Property Lawyer: 202–206.
- Pettit, Philip (2009). Equity and the Law of Trusts. Oxford University Press. ISBN 978-0-19-956102-5.
