= Creation of express trusts in English law =

The creation of express trusts in English law must involve four elements for the trust to be valid: capacity, certainty, constitution and formality. Capacity refers to the settlor's ability to create a trust in the first place; generally speaking, anyone capable of holding property can create a trust. There are exceptions for statutory bodies and corporations, and minors who usually cannot hold property can, in some circumstances, create trusts. Certainty refers to the three certainties required for a trust to be valid. The trust instrument must show certainty of intention to create a trust, certainty of what the subject matter of the trust is, and certainty of who the beneficiaries (or objects) are. Where there is uncertainty for whatever reason, the trust will fail, although the courts have developed ways around this. Constitution means that for the trust to be valid, the property must have been transferred from the settlor to the trustees.

If property has not been transferred, the potential trustees and beneficiaries are volunteers, and an equitable maxim is that "equity will not assist a volunteer"; the courts will not look at the case. To get around this, the courts have developed exceptions to this rule for situations when the settlor has done "all that he could do", the trustees or beneficiaries have acquired the property in a different way, or where the gift was made donatio mortis causa. Formality refers to the specific language or forms used when transferring property. For chattels, no formal language or documentation is needed, unless it is made as a will. For land, the transfer must be drafted in line with the Law of Property Act 1925 and the Law of Property (Miscellaneous Provisions) Act 1989. When disposing of an equitable interest, the Law of Property Act 1925 must also be followed; much of the case law in this area has centred on the meaning of "dispose", with many cases involving people attempting to avoid tax.

== Capacity ==
The first requirement of an express trust is capacity; the person creating the trust must be legally capable of doing so. Generally speaking, anyone capable of holding property can form a trust, although there are exceptions. A minor cannot hold land, and therefore cannot create a trust of land; in addition, unless they are soldiers or "mariners at sea", they cannot form a valid will. Where a minor tries to create a trust, it will be held voidable, and can be repudiated by him when he reaches majority, or soon after. Where the trust is clearly of detriment to the minor, the courts may decide to take it as void; the individual, when he reaches majority, could alternately plead non est factum if he had been too young to appreciate the nature of forming a trust. People who are considered mentally disordered (under the Mental Health Act 1983) and have a receiver appointed cannot have trusts directly enforced against them, as they no longer have control over their property. Where there is no receiver, the mentally disordered person's trust will be held void, unless it was made during a lucid period when the person was capable of understanding their actions. Corporations and statutory bodies only have the powers granted to them by their memorandum of association or authorising statute; if these do not authorise the creation of trusts, any such trust will be held to be ultra vires.

== Three certainties ==
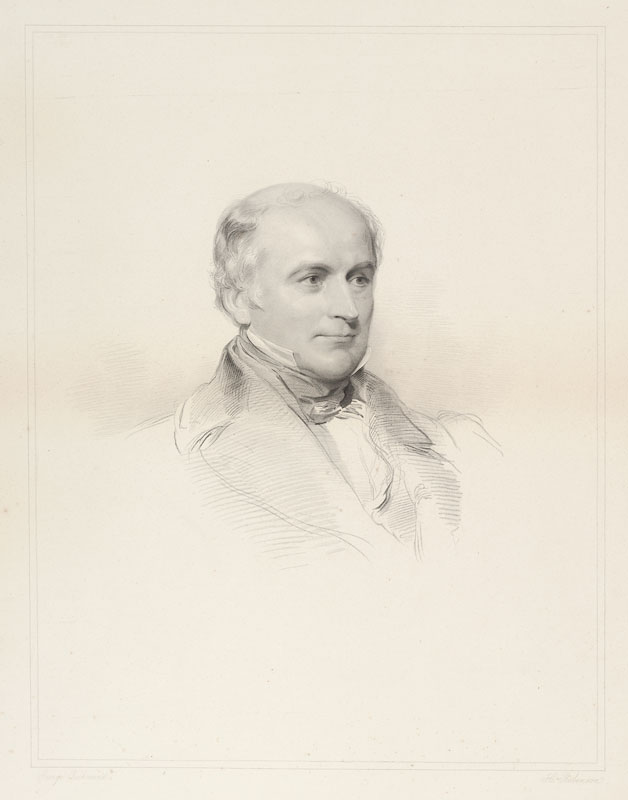
Lord Langdale, who first conceptualised the three certainties in Knight v Knight

For an express trust to be valid, the trust instrument must show certainty of intention, subject matter and object. Certainty of intention means that it must be clear that the settlor or testator wishes to create a trust; this is not dependent on any particular language used, and a trust can be created without the word "trust" being used, or even the settlor knowing he is creating a trust. Since the 1950s, the courts have been more willing to conclude that there was intention to create a trust, rather than hold that the trust is void. Certainty of subject matter means that it must be clear what property is part of the trust. Historically the property must have been segregated from non-trust property; more recently, the courts have drawn a line between tangible and intangible assets, holding that with intangible assets there is not always a need for segregation. Certainty of objects means that it must be clear who the beneficiaries, or objects, are. The test for determining this differs depending on the type of trust; it can be that all beneficiaries must be individually identified, or that the trustees must be able to say with certainty, if a claimant comes before them, whether he is or is not a beneficiary.

Uncertainty comes in four categories: conceptual uncertainty, evidential uncertainty, ascertainability and administrative unworkability. Conceptual uncertainty arises when the language is unclear, which leads to the trust being declared invalid. Evidential uncertainty is where a question of fact, such as whether a claimant is a beneficiary, cannot be answered; this does not always lead to invalidity. Ascertainability is where a beneficiary cannot be found, and administrative unworkability arises when the nature of the trust is such that it cannot realistically be carried out. Trustees and the courts have developed various ways of resolving uncertainties, including the appointment of experts to work out evidential uncertainty, and giving trustees the power to decide who is or is not a beneficiary.

== Constitution ==
The trust must then be formally constituted, by the transfer of its property to the trustees. For chattels, merely handing the property to the trustees is sufficient, assuming it comes with the relevant intention to create a trust. In some circumstances, providing the intention and telling the trustees where to find the property is sufficient, as in Thomas v Times Books. Where the property is land or an equitable interest in land, it must be transferred by writing in accordance with Sections 52-3 of the Law of Property Act 1925. When dealing with shares, the transfer is not complete until a transfer document has been completed and the company has entered the change of ownership in its books. One of the equitable maxims is that "equity will not assist a volunteer"; if someone does not have an interest in property, they cannot bring a court case. When trusts are not properly constituted, the trustees and beneficiaries have no equitable interest in the property, and so are volunteers. There are several exceptions to this maxim. The courts are willing to hear cases where the transfer was not completed, providing the intended beneficiaries or trustees have gained an interest through being made executor of the settlor's estate (the rule in Strong v Bird), or the gift was given donatio mortis causa, or where the settlor did all he could do, as in Re Rose, or where it would be "unconscionable" to hold the gift invalid, as in Pennington v Waine.

== Formality ==
As a general rule, there is no requirement for particular formalities in trust instruments, they can be oral or written. The only requirement is that they show an intention to create a trust. The exceptions are where it is a transfer of land, the transfer of existing equitable interests, or where the trust is made in a will.

=== Land ===
Express trusts over land must comply with Section 53(1)(b) of the Law of Property Act 1925, which provides that:

(b) a declaration of trust respecting any land or any interest therein must be manifested and proved by some writing signed by some person who is able to declare such trust or by his will.

This means that there must be evidence of the trust's existence should someone choose to enforce it, and does not necessarily mean it need be in existence at the trust's creation. Contracts for the sale or disposition of an interest in land, such as a contract to create a trust, must additionally comply with Section 2 of the Law of Property (Miscellaneous Provisions) Act 1989, which provides that:

(i) A contract for the sale or other disposition of an interest in land can only be made in writing, and only by incorporating all the terms which the parties have expressly agreed in one document or, where contracts are exchanged, in each.
(ii) The terms may be incorporated in the document either being set out in it or by reference to some other document.
(iii) The document incorporating the terms or, where contracts are exchanged, one of the documents incorporating them (but not necessarily the same one) must be signed by or on behalf of each party to the contract.

=== Equitable interests ===
For disposing of existing equitable interests, the Law of Property Act 1925 provides in Section 53(1)(c) that:

(c) A disposition of an equitable interest or trust subsisting at the time of the disposition, must be in writing signed by the person disposing of the same, or his agent thereunto lawfully authorised in writing or by will.

Much of the debate in this area is over the definition of "disposition", and unsurprisingly almost all of the cases involve people trying to avoid tax. In Grey v IRC, the House of Lords gave disposition its "natural meaning", saying that it meant "a transaction whereby a beneficiary who has a beneficial interest at the beginning of the transaction no longer has it at the end of the transaction". Under the rule established in Vandervell v IRC, if the owner of a sole beneficial interest instructs his trustees to transfer the property, and this is done to transfer the beneficial interest and not simply to change the trustees, this does not fall under Section 53(1)(c) and requires no specific formalities.

Simply disclaiming a beneficial interest does not fall within Section 53(1)(c), as in Re Paradise Motor Co. Nominating somebody to receive benefits of a pension fund should the pensioner die is also not a valid disposition, as in Re Danish Bacon Co Ltd Staff Pension Fund, and neither is nominating a beneficiary under a life insurance policy, as in Gold v Hill. Where a beneficiary declares he is holding the property on behalf of another, this would be the creation of a sub-trust and not subject to specific formalities. However, under Grainge v Wilberforce, such a sub-trust will only be held to be valid if there is some difference between the trust and sub-trust, and if the trustee-beneficiary has some duties to perform.

=== Wills ===
For a will to be valid (and therefore, for a trust made in a will to be valid) it must comply with Section 9 of the Wills Act 1837. This provides that no will is valid unless:

(a) it is in writing, and signed by the testator, or by some other person in his presence and by his direction; and
(b) it appears that the testator intended by his signature to give effect to the will; and
(c) the signature is made or acknowledged by the testator in the presence of two or more witnesses present at the same time; and
(d) each witness either -
(i) attests and signs the will; or
(ii) acknowledges his signature, in the presence of the testator (but not necessarily in the presence of any other witnesses.

== Bibliography ==
- Edwards, Richard; Nigel Stockwell (2007). Trusts and Equity (8th ed.). Pearson Longman. ISBN 978-1-4058-4684-4.
- Hudson, Alastair (2009). Equity and Trusts (6th ed.). Routledge-Cavendish. ISBN 978-0-415-49771-8.
