= Milroy v Lord =

1862 English trusts law case

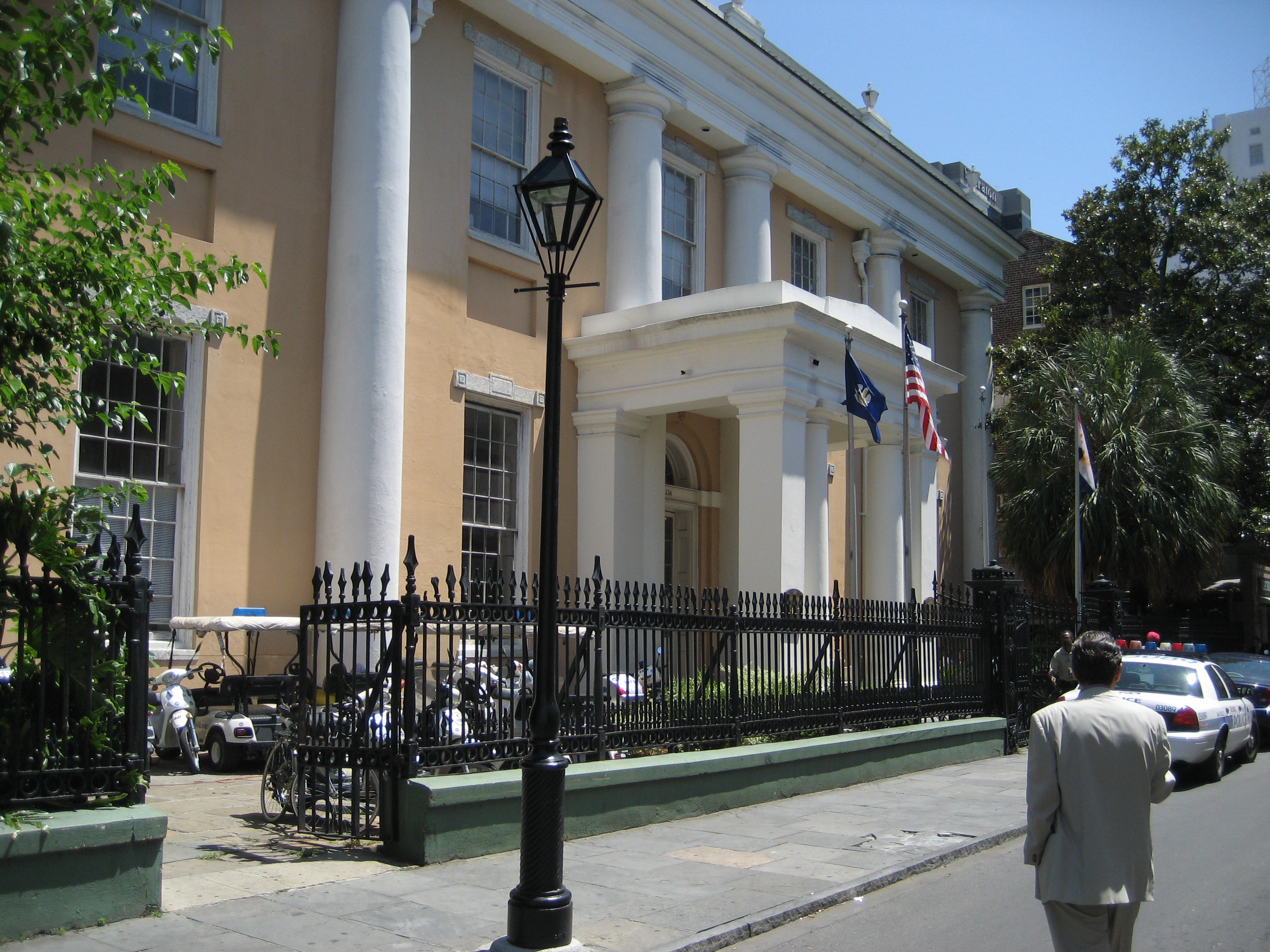
- Bank of Louisiana, New Orleans
- Court: Court of Appeal in Chancery
- Decided: 1862
- Citations: (1862) 4 De GF&J 264, [1861-73] All ER Rep 783, (1862) 7 LT 178
- Transcript: Full transcript at bailii.org

Court membership
- Judges sitting: Knight-Bruce LJ, Turner LJ

Keywords
- Trusts, Constitution, formalities, imperfect gift

Milroy v Lord [1862] EWHC J78 is an English trusts law case that held trusts should not be used to save gifts from being defeated. It purported to follow one of the maxims of equity that "Equity will not assist a volunteer".

== Facts ==
Thomas Medley held shares in a company called the Bank of Louisiana, and wished to transfer them. The bank required the shares be transferred according to regulations in the company constitution. He wanted to give them to his niece, Eleanor Milroy (maiden name Dudgeon). He signed a deed in Louisiana with Samuel Lord, for Lord to hold 50 shares on trust for Eleanor. (This was in fact made in consideration of $1, but this was ignored.) He also gave Lord a power of attorney to receive dividends on the shares and to comply with the company constitution's formalities. Lord did not actually do it. Thomas Medley lived for three years after signing the deed with Samuel Lord, in which Samuel Lord was receiving dividends and passing them on. When Thomas Medley died the shares still remained in his name. Eleanor Milroy claimed that the shares belonged to her.

Stuart VC held that a trust had been created for Eleanor, and the decision was appealed.

== Judgment ==
The Court of Appeal in Chancery held the attempted transfer failed. An ineffective outright transfer could not be regarded as an effective declaration of trust. Knight Bruce LJ said the following.

He might, however, have affected the legal title. It was in his power to make a transfer of the shares so as to confer the legal proprietorship on another person or other persons. But, as I have said, no such thing was done.

Turner LJ concurred. Three ways to give something were (1) legal transfer of title to recipient (2) transfer of title to a trustee for a beneficiary (3) a self-declaration of trust. He continued.

in order to render the settlement binding, one or other of these modes must, as I understand the law of this Court, be resorted to, for there is no equity in this Court to perfect an imperfect gift. The cases I think go further to this extent, that if the settlement is intended to be effectuated by one of the modes to which I have referred, the Court will not give effect to it by applying another of those modes. If it is intended to take effect by transfer, the Court will not hold the intended transfer to operate as a declaration of trust, for then every imperfect instrument would be made effectual by being converted into a perfect trust.

== Significance ==
There were subsequently a host of exceptions to the Milroy v Lord rule. One, almost immediately from Strong v Bird was that if a debtor appointed to an estate as executor will have his debt forgiven if, and only if, the testator manifested an intention to forgive the debt and this intention continued until death. A second, set out in Re Rose, is that the gift will be an effective transfer where the donor has done everything he is obliged to do to make the gift valid. Particularly after T Choithram International SA v Pagarani, it is not clear that Milroy v Lord would be decided in the same way.

== See also ==
- English trusts law
