= Walsh v Lonsdale =

Property Law case on Equity

Walsh v Lonsdale (1882) 21 Ch D 9 (CA) is a leading English law case that concerns the law of property, contract, and equity.

The case was brought by a tenant (Walsh) against a landlord (Lonsdale), seeking to restrain Lonsdale from exercising rights of distraint. Although the parties signed a contractual agreement that provided for a lease to be executed, the lease was never formally executed, such that, prior to the enactment of the Judicature Acts, the King's Bench would have not recognised, in the common law, proprietary interests contracted for. After Walsh had taken possession of the property, he made quarterly payments of rent, instead of annual advance payments as referred to in the agreement, such that the common law would only have recognised the existence of a periodic tenancy as arising from the payments given for possession of the property.

The Court of Appeal unanimously found that there had been an equitable lease that arose between Walsh and Lonsdale upon the signing of the contractual agreement, which would allow the courts to enforce the terms of the agreement for a lease. Not only could the courts grant an order of specific performance on parties to act as if the agreement had itself created a lease, but they may also enforce such rights of the landlord and tenant against third-parties as trespass. The case is cited as an authority for the equitable maxims: "Equity regards as done that which ought to be done", "equity shall prevail where equity and common law conflict", and "equity looks to intent rather than form".

In delivering the first judgment, Sir George Jessel MR ruled that, although the King's Bench would formerly have recognised Walsh as having the common law estate of a periodic tenancy, the effect of the fusion of common law and equitable jurisdictions under the Acts meant that Walsh's equitable estate, which arose from the lease agreements, would prevail. The case remains significant in establishing that the law will recognise the existence of proprietary interests arising from a lease agreement in equity, even where those interests would not otherwise arise in the common law (e.g. for failure to comply with formality requirements), as long as specific performance would be available to the parties in enforcing the agreement.

Walsh is regarded as a controversial decision among legal academics because of its position on the fusion of equity and law. The Law of Property (Miscellaneous Provisions) Act 1989 has restricted the situations in which the Walsh doctrine may apply to instances where there has been a written contract that satisfies certain requirements of formality to be valid, whereas previously it was believed that it could apply where there was evidence that a contract had been written or where one of the parties had partly performed their obligations under the agreement.

== Facts ==
On 29th May 1879, Lonsdale, the defendant, contracted to rent a mill to Walsh, the plaintiff and appellant, for seven years, with Walsh agreeing to produce at least 540 looms per year. The contract stated:

The lease to be prepared by the solicitor to the lessor... [is] to contain such covenants, provisoes, powers, and conditions as are usually inserted in leases of a similar nature, and particularly those inserted in a lease... dated the 1st of May instant, made between...

The effect of the 1st of May lease, had it been in force on the parties, would have been that, firstly, Walsh was to pay the annual rent in advance, and, secondly, that Londale had the right to demand both the unpaid balance for the previous period as well as an advance payment of one year's rent. However, the 30th May contract had also stipulated that the rent would be calculated based on the number of looms Walsh could produce from the mill.

Despite the contract stating that a lease would be executed with the requisite formalities afterwards, the intended lease was never executed, and there had only been a contract in law between the two parties, as leases over three years had certain additional formality requirements to be valid. Until 1882, Walsh had paid his rent in quarterly and not advance payments and to a mortgagee of Lonsdale and not to him directly. In March 1882, Lonsdale demanded from Walsh a sum of money comprising both one year's annual rent and the balance of the rent unpaid, which Lonsdale claimed to comprise the rent from the start of the year until the instant date. Walsh thereafter sued Lonsdale for improper distraint.

== Issues of law ==
Walsh sought damages, an injunction to prevent Lonsdale from selling the property under distraint, and specific performance of the lease agreement.

=== High Court ===
At the High Court, Sir Edward Fry ruled that the two issues were: (i) whether the terms of the 1st of May contract was incorporated into the 29th May contract; (ii) whether "the draft of a lease making a rent... payable in advance had not been so approved by the Plaintiff as to make it binding on him."

Counsel for Walsh argued that there were no arrears and no tenancy that contained the terms of the 1st May contract. Their main submission was that a legal tenancy was created when Walsh began paying quarterly rent to the mortgagee and after he had taken possession of the property, with the terms of this tenancy differing from those in the 29th May agreement, such that the new landlord was the mortgagee and not Lonsdale. Rather, the 29th May agreement was only important as "evidence of the terms of a legal tenancy from year to year", that is, a periodic lease, as opposed to the seven-year lease contained within the agreement. As such, the term in the 29th May contract as regards the payment of rent was inapplicable to the legal tenancy.

It was also argued that distraint could not be exercised as the rent was uncertain. The fact that the 29th May contract had referenced the 1st May contract did not mean that the terms that it contained pertaining to rent would be specifically applicable in regard to the terms in the 29th May contract that stipulated a conditional sum of rent; and even if they were applicable and gave Lonsdale a right of distraint, his letter of demand to Walsh could not have been valid, as it would be impossible to know how much annual rent Walsh is to pay until the end of the year where the number of looms produced can be determined. Lonsdale also could not have requested the sum of an annual rent in the middle of that year.

Counsel for Lonsdale argued that the rent claimed by Lonsdale was the "minimum rent, independent of the number of looms run," which satisfies the requirement of certainty of rent. Upon the mortgage being executed, a lease between Walsh and Lonsdale had been come about, and the mere fact that Walsh had paid the mortgagee did not mean that there was an attornment.

=== Court of Appeal ===
At the Court of Appeal, the appeal was to be decided not upon the determination of the rights of the parties but merely upon whether there was a prima facie case for the High Court to have taken the security that it did. The Court had also considered, in obiter, what the true nature of the lease had been.

Walsh had contended the 29th May agreement did not operate as a demise but merely provided evidence as to a periodic tenancy (or "tenant from year to year"). As such, there was no legal tenancy (that required advance payments) but an equitable tenancy (that involved quarterly payments) instead, and the right of distraint as a common-law, proprietary remedy was not available.

== Judgment ==
On the first issue of whether there was "a fair question to be decided", Sir George Jessel MR held that, as a result of the fusion of equitable and common law jurisdictions under the Judicature Acts, where specific performance was available as a remedy in equity, the courts would enforce the rights under the contract as an equitable lease. Even if such lease did not satisfy the common-law formality requirements, the courts would recognise the rights of both landlord and tenant, including those of forfeiture, re-entry, trespass, and distraint. In the instant case, the equitable interests arose immediately when the 29th May agreement was made.

Prior to the acts, it would have been the case that there was both (i) a common law estate of a periodic annual tenancy as evidenced by the quarterly payments and possession of the property (such that the distraint would be unlawful); and (ii) an equitable estate pertaining to the terms of the 29th May contract (which would have allowed Lonsdale a defence of specific performance to the 29th May agreement). However, Sir George ruled, in interpreting the Judicature Acts, the fact that the terms of the 29th May contract had not later been ratified into a valid document of lease meant that there were no longer two separate estates but a single estate where equitable rules hold priority.

On the second question of the construction of the equitable lease, Sir George Jessel ruled that the fact that Walsh had partly performed the obligations stipulated under the agreement after he came to acquire the proprietary interest was evidence that a contractual licence had emerged which contained the terms of varying rent. Although he did not rule that Lonsdale could simply revoke the licence to which the demise was appuretenant, he did find that, as regards the issue of "whether in drawing the lease a dead or minimum rent ought to be reserved for 540 looms, or is it to be left on covenant", the rent could not only be made to vary but also require a minimum sum, comprising the minimum number of looms produced multiplied by the price of each loom (per the 29th May agreement).

=== Cotton LJ ===
Lord Justice Cotton agreed with Sir George's opinion. He stated that Lonsdale's distraint would be appropos if the lease had indeed required Walsh to make advance payments and that, under the lease, there was a minimum rent (or "dead rent") commensurate with at least 540 looms after the first year, with the balance of the rent corresponding to the number of looms produced after the 540th one being payable on covenant.

=== Lindley LJ ===
Lord Justice Lindley ruled against the plaintiff's argument that the rent will be "simply depend upon covenant, and be an unascertained sum till the end of the year", instead finding that there was a minimum rent, which derived from the lease, of the rent charged for one loom multiplied by the minimum of looms that Walsh had to produce according to the contract.

== Significance ==
The Walsh v Lonsdale principle is cited as authority for the equitable maxim that "Equity looks on as done that which ought to have been done", such that even when one does not transfer a specifically enforceable right to another but had a duty to do so, equity would recognise the interest of the other person in specifically enforcing the right. Walsh is also a leading case on the interpretation of section 25(11) of the Judicature Act 1873, which provides that equity shall prevail where the rules of equity and common law conflict. The case also supports the maxim "Equity looks to the intent rather than to form".

The maxim that "Equity does not act in vain" also provides the general rule that if a lease is already expired, a court will not provide relief in the form of specific performance; however, if specific performance would have been available during the contract prior to termination, then the rule in Walsh allows for the provision of such relief.

=== Subsequent judicial development ===
Walsh stands for the proposition that where there is a contractual agreement for a lease that does not satisfy the common-law requirements for a lease's validity, equity will intervene to create an enforceable equitable lease if specific performance would have been available as a remedy in equity. Even if, at common law, there would otherwise have been a periodic tenancy, the courts may give effect to the equitable lease if it can be found. Megarry and Wade state that the courts have sometimes inaccurately characterised the case as giving rise to the rule that “a contract for a lease [being] as good as a lease”.

Subsequent case law has further specified when the rule in Walsh applies. Generally, it may be said that "if a person goes in and occupies property as tenant under an agreement, it is taken as if an instrument giving effect to the new tenancy on the agreed terms has been executed." Such "agreements" include not only contracts but also court orders.

Further, the rule has been extended to apply to situations where the landlord is not the actual legal owner of the land and cannot, ipso facto, rent the land to the tenant as a result of the common law principle of Nemo dat quod non habet. However, where (i) A has agreed to rent property to B such that only an equitable (and not a common-law) lease arises and (ii) B has agreed to rent property to C despite not having the legal estate to do so in law, if the rule in Walsh would apply such that specific performance would be granted in both agreements, then the court may find that an equitable lease exists as between A and C, even if A and C did not previously have existing legal relations.

Megarry and Wade have also argued for a further extension of the rule in Walsh to equitable mortgagees, such that equitable mortgagees be allowed to take possession in equity as legal mortgagees do in law, although there is little judicial acceptance of this proposal.

The doctrine in Walsh was also applied by the House of Lords in National Carriers v Panalpina (Northern) in supporting the proposition that the doctrine of frustration applied to leases. In that case, counsel for the respondents had argued that, because leases gave tenants proprietary interests, they operate in rem and hence were immune to the merely contractual frustration doctrine. Lord Simon, ruling against the respondents, noted that the mere fact that an agreement had granted an interest in land did not mean that the doctrine of frustration was unavailable, as an equitable interest in land may arise by operation of the Walsh principle, and because an agreement to lease clearly can be frustrated, there would be no principled basis for allowing only equitable leases and not legal ones to be frustrated.

=== Effects of legislation ===
The Law of Property (Miscellaneous Provisions) Act 1989 restricts the Walsh rule and the instances wherein an equitable lease may be created. Prior to the Act, such a lease may be found where there was only evidence of a written contract or past performance, even if no written contract can be found. However, the Act stipulates that there must now be a written contract that expressly incorporates all the terms of contract, and neither past performance nor mere evidence of a contract may in themselves give rise to an equitable lease. The current law is that where a contract for the disposition of land is valid under the LPA(MP)A 1989, the agreement for a lease can be recognised as an equitable lease even where the formal requirements for the disposition are not met (e.g. where the lease is for more than three years and requires a deed).

A normative reason behind the restriction of the rule is that, because equitable interests arising under the doctrine have legal effects on third parties, a written contract serves evidential, cautionary, and labelling functions.

== Academic commentary ==
Among scholars of land law and equity, the decision is controversial. Hanbury and Martin regard the decision as merely demonstrating that the common law and equity can be procedurally administered within the same courts, and that, if the issue had arisen before the Judicature Acts, the same result would have been arrived at, although it would have been more burdensome on the parties to have to seek relief from both the courts of equity and law. Snell's Equity, whilst agreeing with the point that the same result could have been achieved as equity would have recognised the landlord's specifically enforceable rights, noted that Sir George Jessel's reasoning goes further in abolishing the distinction between legal and equitable leases.

On the other hand, Megarry and Wade argue that the case was "novel" and that the courts would have only granted such relief "in very limited circumstances".

== See also ==
- Equity
