= Morgan v. Hamlet =

- Supreme Court of the United States

Argued January 30, 1885 Decided March 2, 1885
- Full case name: Morgan v. Hamlet
- Citations: 113 U.S. 449 (more) 5 S. Ct. 583; 28 L. Ed. 1043

Court membership
- Chief Justice Morrison Waite Associate Justices Samuel F. Miller · Stephen J. Field; Joseph P. Bradley · John M. Harlan; William B. Woods · Stanley Matthews; Horace Gray · Samuel Blatchford

Case opinion
- Majority: Matthews, joined by unanimous

Morgan v. Hamlet, 113 U.S. 449 (1885), was a bill in equity filed by the appellants, September 3, 1879.

== Facts ==
The complainants are the administrator de bonis non of Samuel D. Morgan, deceased, and the children and heirs at law and widow of the intestate, citizens of North Carolina. The female defendants are the children and heirs at law of John G. Morgan, deceased, sued with their husbands, and all citizens of Arkansas.

In 1860, a partnership was formed between two brothers, Samuel D. Morgan and John G. Morgan, the former advancing the means, the latter being bankrupt, for stocking and cultivating a cotton plantation in Arkansas, purchased in the name of the firm, but paid for only in part. Samuel D. Morgan continued to reside in North Carolina. John G. Morgan lived on the plantation in Arkansas, and personally conducted its operations. This he did during several years, including the year 1865, when the plantation was sold, under judicial proceedings, to pay the unpaid purchase money. Samuel D. Morgan died in January 1864.

John G. Morgan died in 1875, the defendants, his heirs at law, having come into possession of the property in his possession at his decease, more than sufficient to satisfy the claim of the complainants.

Of the complainants, Samuel T. Morgan became of age September 8, 1876, and William W. Morgan in May 1878. They never had a guardian, and allege their ignorance of the frauds charged to have been practiced against them by John G. Morgan until in 1879.

The answer of the defendants, though admitting the fact of such a partnership as alleged, denies that any profits were made and denies all the allegations of fraud. It also shows that John G. Morgan died in April 1875, leaving him surviving Emma S. Morgan, his widow, and the defendants, Alice R. Hamlet and Emma G. Abell, and Lula Morgan, an infant, his only children; that letters of administration were issued on his estate by the Probate Court of Chicot County, Arkansas, in which he lived at the time of his death, on August 6, 1875, to his widow, who acted as administratrix of his estate until October 13, 1875, when she resigned, and the defendant John C. Hamlet was appointed by the same court administrator de bonis non, and qualified and acted as such. And it is relied on as a defense that the demands made in the bill were not authenticated and presented to the administratrix or the administrator de bonis non of John G. Morgan, deceased, according to law, within two years of the granting of letters of administration on his estate.

On final hearing the bill was dismissed. From this decree the complainants brought this appeal.

== Judgment ==
In Arkansas, it appears that there is a special statute of limitations governing claims against estates of deceased persons, commonly called the "Statute of Nonclaim." It is as follows:

All demands not exhibited to the executor or administrator, as required by this act, before the end of two years from the granting of letters, shall be forever barred.

It has been decided that the statute runs against all creditors, whether resident or nonresident. Erwin v. Turner, 6 Ark. 14.

And that all claims fall within the provisions of the statute that are capable of being asserted in a court of law or equity existing at the death of the deceased or coming into existence within two years after the grant of administration, whether due or not, if running to a certain maturity.

And the effect of a failure to present the claim as prescribed in the statute is not to let it in against the heirs or devisees, but it is to bar is forever as against all persons. Bennett v. Dawson, 18 Ark. 334; Brearly v. Norris, 23 Ark. 771.

In 84 U. S. 530, in a like case, it was held by this Court that the failure to present the claim is, in the absence of circumstances constituting an excuse, fatal to the bill for relief in equity.

It is sought in argument on behalf of the appellants to distinguish their case—at least the case of the two infant children of Samuel D. Morgan—from any case within the statute of nonclaim on the ground that at the death of their father, his title to the real estate, which constituted the plantation, descended to them as his heirs at law, and thereafter, as to the operations conducted by John Morgan in 1864 and 1865, having no guardian, the latter was in equity their representative and guardian de son tort and trustee, so that upon his death and until they arrived at age, there was no one competent to make a demand against his administrator, within the terms of the statute.

But we are unable to appreciate the force of this supposed distinction. The statute in question contains no exception in favor of claimants under disability of nonage or otherwise; the claim of the complainants against John G. Morgan was adverse to his administrator, although it may have originated in consequence of a relation of trust, and there is no ground that we are able to understand on which it can be excepted out of the operation of the statute in question. Their claim was equally against the administrator of John G. Morgan whether the latter be considered as the defaulting partner of themselves or of their father. Whatever its description, it was a claim against the estate of John G. Morgan, and for which his personal representative was in the first instance liable, and the statute is a bar to every such claim unless presented within the time prescribed.

On this ground the decree of the circuit court was affirmed.

== See also ==
- List of United States Supreme Court cases, volume 113
