= Blackwell v Blackwell =

- Court: House of Lords
- Citations: [1929] UKHL 1, [1929] AC 318

Court membership
- Judge sitting: Lord Chancellor Viscount Sumner Lord Buckmaster Lord Carson Lord Warrington of Clyffe

Keywords
- Competition, collusion

Blackwell v Blackwell [1929] UKHL 1 is an English trusts law case, concerning the doctrine of secret trusts.

== Facts ==
A testator gave £12,000 in a codicil to five people on trust, saying they should invest using their discretion and ‘to apply the income.... for the purposes indicated by me to them.’ Four were told the general objects, and the fifth got detailed instructions. All accepted. The fifth also made a memorandum of the testator’s instructions, but a few hours after the codicil was executed. The residuary legatees claimed that any trust was invalid, because parol evidence was inadmissible to establish the testator’s purposes.

Eve J held the evidence was admissible. Court of Appeal agreed with Eve J, so there was a valid secret trust.

== Judgment ==
The House of Lords held that the secret trust was valid, because the details were laid out around the same time as the execution of the codicil to the will.

Lord Buckmaster said the following.

This principle is easily understood and may be also stated by saying that he cannot defraud beneficiaries for whom he has consented to act by keeping the money for himself. Apart, however, from the personal benefit accruing to the trustee, the real beneficiaries are equally defrauded in both cases, and the faith on which the testator relied is equally betrayed.

Viscount Sumner said that the doctrine that trusts would be recognised to prevent “fraud” did not conflict with the various Wills Acts, a ‘perfectly normal exercise of general equitable jurisdiction.’

A court of conscience finds a man in the position of an absolute legal owner of a sum of money, which has been bequeathed to him under a valid will, and it declares that, on proof of certain facts relating to the motives and actions of the testator, it will not allow the legal owner to exercise his legal right to do what he will with his own. This seems to be a perfectly normal exercise of general equitable jurisdiction.... The necessary elements on which the question turns are intention, communication, and acquiescence. The testator intends his absolute gift to be employed as he and not as the donee desires; he tells the proposed donee of this intention and, either by express promise or by the tacit promise, which is satisfied by acquiescence, the proposed donee encourages him to bequeath the money on the faith that his intention will be carried out.

[...]

Why should equity forbid an honest trustee to give effect to his promise, made to a deceased testator, and compel him to pay another legatee, about whom it is quite certain that the testator did not mean to make him the object of his bounty? Why should equity, over a mere matter of words, give effect to them in one case and frustrate them in the other?

[...]

a testator cannot reserve to himself a power of making future unwitnessed dispositions by merely naming a trustee and leaving the purposes of the trust to be supplied afterwards, nor can a legatee give testamentary validity to an unexecuted codicil by accepting an indefinite trust, never communicated in the testator’s lifetime: Johnson v Ball, Re Boyes, Re Hetley. To hold otherwise would indeed enable the testator to “give the go-by” to the requirements of the Wills Act, because he did not choose to comply with them. It is communication of the purpose to the legatee, coupled with an acquiescence or promise on his part, that removes the matter from the provision of the Wills Act and brings it within the law of trusts, as applied in this instance to trustees, who happen also to be legatees.

== See also ==
- English trusts law
