= Latec Investments Ltd v Hotel Terrigal Pty Ltd =

Judgement of the High Court of Australia

- Court: High Court of Australia
- Full case name: Latec Investments Limited and others v Hotel Terrigal Pty Limited (in liquidation) and others
- Decided: 12 April 1965
- Citations: [1965] HCA 17, (1965) 113 CLR 265

Court membership
- Judges sitting: Kitto, Taylor and Menzies JJ

Case opinions
- A mortgagee fraudulently exercised the power of sale. The sale was void against the mortgagee, but the fraud did not affect an equitable charge subsequently granted to a bona fide purchaser.

Latec Investments Ltd v Hotel Terrigal Pty Ltd is a 1965 property law decision of the High Court of Australia. It contains a discussion of the principles upon which the priority of competing equitable interests in land is to be determined.

== Facts ==
Latec was the mortgagee of land owned by Hotel Terrigal. Hotel Terrigal fell into arrears in repaying the loan and Latec, purporting to exercise its mortgagee’s power of sale, sold the property. It conducted an auction on an unfavourable day of the week with little time for proper advertisement (to make sure that the property could not be sold at the auction). The highest bid was 58,000 and later Latec sold the property to its wholly owned subsidiary, Southern Hotels for 60,000. Southern became the registered proprietor.

Subsequently, Southern granted a floating charge over all its assets as security for the debenture issued to the public to the trustee of the debenture holders, MLC Nominee. The prospectuses for the debentures offered explicitly stated that the Hotel Terrigal was owned by Southern.

Five years later, Hotel Terrigal argued that Latec had fraudulently sold the property to Southern, giving rise to an equitable right to rescind and set aside the sale of the property.

== Issues ==
The issue is about the priority between Hotel Terrigal's and MLC's interest in the property.

Hotel Terrigal has the right to apply to the court to have the sale (from Latec to Southern Hotels) set aside.

MLC, being the trustee of the debenture holders, is the chargee of the subject property.

== Previous authorities ==
=== Rice v Rice: between two equities, the first in time prevails ===
In Rice v Rice, Kindersley VC said:

As between persons having only equitable interests, if their equities are in all other respects equal, priority of time gives the better equity; or, qui prior est tempore potior est jure.

=== Competing authorities: purchasers for value without notice ===
There was a conflict of opinion between Lord Westbury and Lord St Leonards concerning the availability of the defence of purchaser for value without notice in the case of competing equitable interests. Lord St Leonards maintained that the defence was always available.

In Phillips v Phillips Lord Westbury said:

[E]very conveyance of an equitable interest is an innocent conveyance, that is to say, the grant of a person entitled merely in equity passes only that which he is justly entitled to and no more ... where there are circumstances that give rise to an equity as distinguished from an equitable estate—as for example, an equity to set aside a deed for fraud, or to correct it for mistake—and the purchaser under the instrument maintains the plea of purchase for valuable consideration without notice, the Court will not interfere.

This obiter establishes a new category of equitable interests, mere equity, against which the defence of purchase for value without notice is available.

In Stump v Gaby, Lord St Leonards held that "when a decree is made for setting aside a conveyance it relates back, and the grantee is to be treated as having been, from the first, a trustee for the grantor, who therefore has an equitable estate, not mere right of suit."

== Decision ==
The court unanimously held that MLC's equitable interest prevailed over Hotel Terrigal's interest. However, Kitto, Taylor and Menzies JJ each gave separate judgments.

=== Kitto J ===
Mere equity is an equity which must be made good before an equitable interest can be held to exist. It is distinct from, because logically antecedent to, the equitable interest.

The defence of bona fide purchase without notice can only succeed against the equity not the consequential equitable interest. If successful, the "first in time" rule does not apply for it only applies as between equitable interests.

In this case, Hotel Terrigal's right to set aside the fraudulent sale made by Latec was a mere equity, and must be postponed to MLC's equitable interests.

=== Menzies J ===
Each line of authorities applies in different circumstances. "if Terrigal were a person instead of a company and the question were whether that person had a devisable interest in the hotel property by virtue of his equity to have the conveyance to Southern set aside, Stump v Gaby applies and Terrigal had an equitable interest in the hotel property."

"where the question arises in a contest between Terrigal and MLC Nominees, the holders of an equitable interest in the hotel property acquired without notice of Terrigal's right, the authority Phillips v Phillips applies. Terrigal's equity is not entitled to priority merely because it came into existence at an earlier time."

=== Taylor J ===
The mere equity argument misconceives the significance of Lord Westbury's observation.

The Stump v Gaby line of authority established that where the owner of property has been induced by fraud to convey it the grantor continues to have an equitable interest therein and that the interest may be devised or assigned inter vivos and that the grantor's interest in the property does not come into existence only if and when the conveyance is set aside. These cases however has nothing to say concerning the principles upon which the priority of competing equitable interests is to be determined. If such equitable interest is to be postponed, there must be some other reasons than being mere equity.

The defence of purchaser for value without notice of a prior equitable interest cannot be generally maintained but it does appear that it has always been allowed to prevail where the person entitled to the earlier interest required the assistance of a court of equity to remove an impediment to his title as a preliminary to asserting his interest. It is because a plaintiff in such cases will be denied the assistance of the court to remove the impediment to his title.

== Criticism ==
Mere equity may have proprietary characteristics.

Many equitable interests rest on curial discretion.

== Adoption ==
The approach of Menzies J has since been approved by Meagher, Gummow and Lehane in Equity Doctrines & Remedies at [427]–[435]. Bradbrook, MacCallum and Moore criticise the distinctions between mere equities and equitable interests. Most academics favour the judgment of Kitto J.
