= Pennington v Waine =

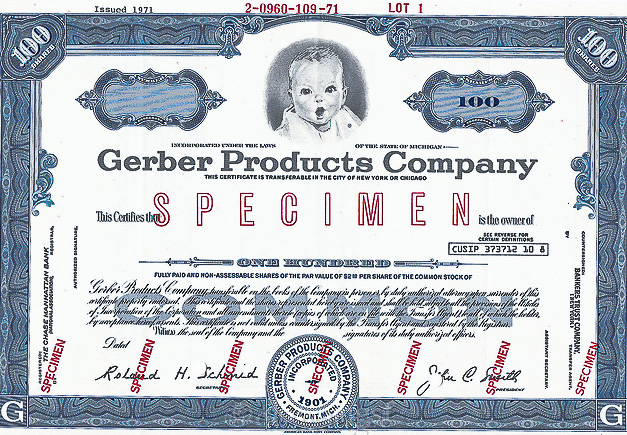
- Court: Court of Appeal
- Citations: [2002] EWCA Civ 227, [2002] 1 WLR 2075

Court membership
- Judges sitting: Arden LJ, Clarke LJ, Schiemann LJ

Case opinions
- Arden LJ, Clarke LJ

Keywords
- Intention, formality, constructive trust

Pennington v Waine [2002] EWCA Civ 227 is an English trusts law case, concerning the requirements for a trust to be properly constituted, and the operation of constructive trusts. The case represents an equitable exception to the need for a complete transfer of property in law.

== Facts ==
Mrs Ada Crampton wanted to transfer her 400 shares in a company called Crampton Bros. (Coopers) Ltd to her nephew, Harold. She asked Mr Pennington, who represented the company's auditors, to prepare a share transfer form. She filled it in and gave it back to Mr Pennington. Mr Pennington put it on the auditors’ files but never gave it on to the company for the registration of shares in Harold's name to be completed. Ada died. The other people who stood to inherit, (including Philip Waine) argued that unlike Re Rose, Ada had not done all she could have, because she had not handed the completed transfer form to Harold or the company. Harold contended that the shares were held on trust for him, so that the transfer must be completed.

== Judgment ==
The Court of Appeal held that the shares did indeed belong to Harold.

Arden LJ held that it would have been unconscionable for Ada to change her mind and go back on the transfer. Ada had given the transfer form to Pennington so that he could do the registration. She had told Harold about the gift, and no action on his part was necessary. Moreover, Harold had agreed to be a company director, for which a shareholding was needed.

Clarke LJ held that equitable title could transfer without registration. Completion of forms and delivery to a company was enough in Re Rose, but it should be recognised that delivery to the company was not a further essential step. It was enough that the transfer was intended to have immediate effect. He said the following.

74. It is certainly true that Ada could have done more. She could have delivered the transfer form to Harold or to the company. She could indeed have applied to the company to enter Harold’s name in its register of members because section 183(4) of the Companies Act 1985 provides:

“On the application of the transferor of any share or interest in a company, the company shall enter in its register of members the name of the transferee in the same manner and subject to the same conditions as if the application for the entry were made by the transferee.”

Mr McGhee submits that the principle that equity will intervene only where the donor has done everything in his or her power to perfect the gift cannot be literally true because there is almost always something more that the donor could have done. There seems to me to be some force in that submission and I shall return to it below.

75. As I understood his position during the course of the argument, Mr McGhee does not challenge the judge’s conclusion that, although Mr Pennington acted both as adviser to Ada and as the company auditor and although the executed transfer form was put into a company file, it was not at any stage delivered to the company. In these circumstances, at any rate in the absence of a respondent’s notice, I accept Mr Weatherill’s submission that it is not open to us to hold that the form came into the possession of the company. It would not therefore be right to speculate as to the conclusion which I might have reached if the respondent had challenged that finding.

76. I am bound to say that if the matter were free of authority, I would hold that the beneficial interest in the shares passed to Harold. Ada executed the correct share transfer form, which on its face has the effect of transferring the shares to Harold, and gave it to Mr Pennington. She did not think that it was necessary for her to take any further step to effect the transfer to Harold. She did not at any stage intend to reserve a right to withdraw the form. It is plain from the number of shares which she bequeathed to Harold in her will that she intended him to have a controlling share of the company and that, up until her death, she thought that the transfer of the 400 shares was valid. It is a reasonable inference that otherwise she would have bequeathed a larger number of shares to him. If at any stage before her death, she had been asked how many shares were owned by Harold, she would have said 400. Moreover, if she had been asked to take some further step to perfect Harold’s legal title to the shares, she would have taken it.

77. In these circumstances, although I know that hard cases make bad law, I would have expected Harold to be entitled both to the 400 shares apparently transferred by stock transfer form and the shares bequeathed to him, with the consequence that, on Ada’s death, he became entitled to 51 per cent of the issued shares in the company. I should add that, if unconscionability is the test, I agree with Arden LJ that it would have been unconscionable of Ada, as at the time of her death (if not earlier), to assert that the beneficial interest in the 400 shares had not passed to Harold. It would certainly be unconscionable of the estate to seek to resile from the transfer after Ada’s death because, as at her death, she plainly intended Harold to own the shares.

78. The difficulty is to identify the correct approach in law and equity to the facts of this case. In addition to the facts just set out, a feature of the case which has particularly struck me stems from the role and wording of the stock transfer form. Section 1 of the Stock Transfer Act 1963 (“the 1963 Act”) provides, so far as relevant, as follows:

(1) Registered securities to which this section applies may be transferred by means of an instrument under hand in the form set out in Schedule 1 to this Act (in this Act referred to as a stock transfer), executed by the transferor only and specifying (in addition to the particulars of the consideration, of the description and number or amount of the securities, and of the person by whom the transfer is made) the full name and address of the transferee.

(2) The execution of a stock transfer need not be attested; ….

(3) Nothing in this section shall be construed as affecting the validity of any instrument which would be effective to transfer securities apart from this section; ….”

Section 1(4) sets out the securities to which the section applies. They include shares in a company.

79. Schedule 1 sets out the basic stock transfer form, which was the form which was used here. The form describes the consideration as nil, sets out the number of shares transferred, namely 400, and gives Ada’s name as transferor. The form continues: “I/We hereby transfer the above security out of the name(s) aforesaid to the person(s) named below”. Ada signed her name in the box immediately under that declaration and Harold’s name and address then appears as the transferee. Under Harold’s name there appears the further statement: “I/We request that such entries be made in the register as are necessary to give effect to the transfer.” To my mind none of the remainder of the form is relevant for present purposes. It was dated 12th October 1998.

80. On the face of the form, by her signature Ada thereby transferred 400 shares in the company to Harold. It seems to me that when the form as so executed is read with section 1 of the 1963 Act, the apparent effect of Ada’s signature on the form was to transfer the 400 shares to Harold. The question is what, if any effect that signature has. It is true, as is (as I understand it) common ground, that such a transfer cannot have the effect of transferring the legal title to the shares because the transferee cannot become the legal owner of the shares until they are registered in his or her name. It is, however, also common ground that a transferee can become the owner of shares in equity without becoming the legal owner for want of registration: Re Rose [1952] Ch 499.

81. As I see it, a potentially important question in this appeal is whether the execution of a stock transfer form can have effect as an equitable assignment without the necessity of a transfer or delivery of the form or the share certificates either to the transferee or to the company. In the absence of binding authority to the contrary, I can see no reason in principle why the answer to that question should not be yes.

82. There is nothing in the provisions of the 1963 Act which suggests that delivery is necessary to effect the transfer. On the contrary, section 1(1) provides that that registered securities “may be transferred by means of an instrument under hand”. It does not provide that they may, let alone may only, be transferred by delivery of such an instrument, whether to the transferee or to the company.

83. Moreover, there is, so far as I am aware, no case which is authority for the proposition that an equitable assignment of shares, or perhaps strictly of the shareholder’s rights to and under the shares, cannot be effective without delivery of the share certificates or the instrument of transfer. It is not, to my mind, surprising that there is no authority for such a proposition because there is no need for such a principle.

84. Delivery of the instrument of transfer to the transferee has never been necessary to effect a transfer of shares, whether at law or in equity. Thus in Standing v Bowring (1885) 31 Ch D 282 the plaintiff executed an instrument transferring shares into the joint names of herself and her godson. It is not clear from the report whether the instrument was under hand or was a deed. The plaintiff did not deliver the instrument to her godson, although, as Lindley LJ put it, she caused the shares to be so transferred in the books of the Bank of England. Two years later she married and wanted to recover the shares for herself. Her godson only learned of the shares when asked to re-transfer them to her. It was held by this court that she was not entitled to have them (or strictly his interest in them) re-transferred because both the legal and beneficial interest in the shares had passed to him.

85. Cotton LJ expressed the position thus (at p 288):

“Now, I take the rule of law to be that where there is a transfer of property to a person, even although it carries with it some obligations which may be onerous, it vests in him at once before he even knows of the transfer, subject to his right when informed of it to say, if he pleases, “I will not take it””.

The court there held both that the plaintiff was not entitled to have the legal title to the shares re-transferred and also that there were no equitable grounds on which the plaintiff was entitled to relief. It is, I think, plain that in this latter respect the court was impressed by the fact that the plaintiff deliberately transferred the shares into her joint names after being advised that she would not be able to rescind the transaction and, as Lindley LJ put it (at p 288), clearly intending her godson to keep the shares for his own benefit after her death. Although the court did not put in these terms, it plainly thought that it would have been unconscionable to allow the plaintiff to resile from the transaction.

86. The case is not of course on all fours with the instant case, but it shows that delivery to the transferee is not required to effect a transfer in law or in equity. Thus, in the instant case, if Ada had procured the registration of Harold as the owner of the shares in the books of the company, the legal title to the shares would have passed to him. In these circumstances I can see no reason for holding that there was no valid equitable assignment to him without delivery of the transfer or shares to him.

87. Nor can I see any reason why delivery to the company of either the share certificates or the transfer form should be necessary to perfect an equitable assignment. In this regard it does not seem to me to matter whether the stock transfer form was executed under hand or under seal. In either event, absent registration, the transfer could only take effect as an equitable assignment. Even if the transfer had been by deed, it would only have operated as an equitable assignment until the shares had been registered in the name of the transferee. Yet, in that case, there can I think be no doubt that on the facts set out by Arden LJ, there would have been a valid equitable assignment of the shares.

88. That is I think clear from cases such as Macedo v Stroud [1922] AC 330. Arden LJ has referred to the purported transfer of part of the real property in that case by unregistered memorandum. Another part of the property was transferred by deed, which stated that it was signed and delivered by Ribeiro, who was the donor. He did not in fact deliver the deed to the donee. The Judicial Committee nevertheless held that gift was effective to pass the property. In giving the judgment of the Board Viscount Haldane said (at p 337):

“Their Lordships entertain no doubt that the conveyance of the unregistered property was a deed which was duly delivered. As was said by Blackburn J in Xenos v Wickham (1867) 2 HL 296, 312 no particular technical form of words or acts is necessary to render an instrument the deed of the party who has executed it. For as soon as there are acts or words showing that it was intended to be executed as his deed that is sufficient. The usual way of showing this is formal delivery: “but any other words or acts that sufficiently show that it was intended to be finally executed will do as well. And it is clear on the authorities, as well as the reason of the thing, that the deed is binding on the obligor before it comes into the custody of the obligee, nay before he even knows of it, though, of course, if he has not previously assented to the making of the deed, the obligee may refuse it.” He goes on to point out that the grantor may deliver to his own servant, if the grantor makes delivery, intending to make the deed his own deed. That a deed may be validly executed, even though it remains in the custody of the person who made it or his agent, appears from what was laid down in Doe v Knight 5 B&C 671. It is no doubt true that a deed may be delivered on a condition that it is not to be operative until some event happens or some condition is performed. In such a case it is until then an escrow only. But in the present case there was no event or condition specified to qualify the delivery which Ribeiro is said in the attestation clause to have made, and which the Courts below have found that he made. As it is not possible to contend successfully that the conveyance was a nullity, it must be taken to have operated completely to transfer the title to the respondent.”.

89. In that case the deed was held to be effective to pass the legal title to the land, but the same or similar reasoning would have led to the conclusion that the execution of the deed was in principle sufficient to operate as an equitable assignment. Such a conclusion was reached in In Re Ways Trusts (1864) 2 DJ&S 365, where a person entitled to an equitable reversionary interest in some stock made a voluntary assignment of it by deed to trustees. Such an assignment could, of course, only have effect as an equitable assignment. Although the report states (at p 366) that the deed was formally signed, sealed and delivered by Lady Cholmeley, the delivery must have been made in the limited sense described by Viscount Haldane in Macedo v Stroud, because no notice of the deed was given to the trustees named in it or to any person interested under it, or to the original trustees of the stock and Lady Cholmeley retained the deed and subsequently destroyed it. She thereafter made a different disposition of it by will. The stock remained in the names of the original trustees throughout.

[...]

113. The cases of Warriner v Rogers (1873) LR 16 Eq 340 and Richards v Delbridge (1874) LR 18 Eq 11 were also cases of imperfect gifts of real or personal property. So too was Mascall v Mascall. In Moore v Moore (1874) LR 18 Eq 474 there was no document which could amount to an equitable assignment. As I read Heartley v Nicholson (1874) 19 LR Eq 233, it was not alleged that there was a complete equitable assignment of the shares. On the other hand Re Griffin [1899] 1 Ch 408 does seem to be an example of an equitable assignment, although on different facts from these. It does not seem to me to affect the conclusion set out above.

114. The first of the two possible exceptions is Pehrsson v von Greyerz, to which I have already referred. In that case Mr Pehrsson intended to give his shares in a company to Miss von Greyerz. However, as I read the report, he did not execute an appropriate form of transfer and Lord Hoffmann, giving the judgment of the Judicial Committee, said that there was no evidence that he intended to transfer a beneficial interest in the shares to her. As Lord Hoffmann put it, all his dealings were concerned only with procuring the registration of the shares in her name. It was held that it was impossible to construe the gift as having taken by a change in the beneficial interest before the transfer was registered. In these circumstances that case seems to me to be very different from this because here the terms of the stock transfer form show that Ada intended there and then to transfer her beneficial interest in the shares to Harold. It seems to me that the Privy Council’s conclusion on this part of Pehrsson v von Greyerz would probably have been different if the transfer had, on its true construction, transferred Mr Pehrsson’s beneficial interest in the shares to Miss von Greyerz. Since it did not, the problem with which we are faced in this case did not arise.

115. Finally, the second possible exception is another decision of the Privy Council, namely Choithram International SA v Pagarani [2001] 1 WLR 1, to which Arden LJ has referred. It seems to me to give some assistance to the analysis set out above. As Arden LJ has observed, (at p 11) Lord Browne-Wilkinson highlighted the contrast between the maxim that equity will not aid a volunteer and the maxim that it will not strive officiously to defeat a gift. It seems to me that if equity refuses to aid Harold on the facts of this case, it will prefer the former maxim to the latter, whereas all the circumstances of the case lead to the conclusion that it should give effect to the gift which Ada intended.

Schiemann LJ concurred with Arden LJ.

== Subsequent case ==
Curtis v Pulbrook considered what constitutes "unconscionable” in Pennington v Waine. It suggested that donee's acting to his detriment in reliance on the promised gift is essential, making the situation a form of proprietary estoppel.

== See also ==
- English trusts law
- English land law
- English property law
