= Trustee de son tort =

A trustee de son tort is a person who may be regarded as owing fiduciary duties by a course of conduct that amounts to a wrong, or a tort. Accordingly, a trustee de son tort is not a person who is formally appointed as a trustee, but one who assumes such a role, and then cannot be heard to argue that he did not owe fiduciary duties.

== Overview ==
The courts may hold a person a constructive trustee instead of prosecuting and, thereby, impose the liabilities of an actual trustee in accounting for his or her acts.

Lewin on Trusts says at 42-74:

If a person by mistake or otherwise assumes the character of trustee when it does not really belong to him, he becomes a trustee de son tort and he may be called to account by the beneficiaries for the money he has received under the colour of the trust. A trustee de son tort closely resembles an express trustee. The principle is that a person who assumes an office ought not to be in a better position than if he were what he pretends; he is accountable as if he had the authority which he has assumed. While it is essential, if a person is to become a trustee de son tort, that he consciously takes the office of trustee, it does not matter whether he knows all the trusts or the extent of his powers.

Thomas and Hudson's The Law on Trusts says at para 30.03:

... trustees de son tort are not expressly declared by the settlor to be trustees but rather are deemed to be constructive trustees by operation of law, due to their meddling with trust affairs, they are therefore constructive trustees.

A "trustee de son tort" is to be contrasted with a delegate who is appointed by a trustee to undertake certain functions: such a person derives his authority from the trustee and is entitled to act in accordance with the delegated authority without himself becoming a trustee. A delegate, in such circumstance, has done no "wrong" and is not intermeddling in the trust and so does not become a “trustee de son tort”.

The court also considered the concept of a trustee de son tort and whether an agent, appointed by a duly constituted trustee, could itself be a trustee de son tort in circumstances where the agent's actions caused loss to the trust fund.

It was argued that it was commonplace in the trust industry for the administration of a trust to be carried out largely by another company (other than the trustee) within the same group of companies as the corporate trustee. It would cause considerable surprise in the industry if such a company was to find itself designated a trustee de son tort. Because it was common practice it was important that an authoritative decision be given as to whether such an administrative company should be treated as a trustee de son tort.

== Cases ==
- Dubai Aluminium Company Ltd v. Salaam [2002] UKHL 48 (5 December 2002), House of Lords (UK)
- Barnes v Addy (1874) LR 9 Ch App 244
- Mara v Browne [1896] 1 Ch 199
- Re Barney [1892] 2 Ch 265
- Williams-Ashman v Price and Williams [1942] Ch 219

== See also ==
- English trusts law
- US trusts law
- Executor
- Morgan v. Hamlet, 113 U.S. 449 (1885)
