= Mara v Browne =

- Court: Chancery Court
- Decided: 17 Dec 1895

Court membership
- Judges sitting: Lord Herschell, A.L. Smith, Rigby

Keywords
- Trustee, Breach of trust, Solicitor, Trustee de son tort, Constructive trustee, Liability of partner

Mara v Browne [1895] is a Court of Chancery case that dealt with liability as a constructive trustee ultimately ruling that, "if one, not being a trustee and not having authority from a trustee, takes upon himself to inter-meddle with trust matters or to do acts characteristic of the office of trustee, he may therefore make himself what is called in law trustee of his own wrong - i.e., a trustee de son tort, or, as it is also termed, a "constructive trustee."

== Facts ==
By a settlement made in 1875 on the marriage of the plaintiff, Ellen Jane Reeves [nee Walker], with Harold Reeves, certain securities belonging to the wife were transferred to trustees upon trust to invest and pay the income to the wife during the joint lives of herself and her husband for her separate use, without power of anticipation, and after her death, if the husband should survive, to pay the income to him during his life, and after the death of the survivor, upon the usual trusts for the children of the marriage, with an ultimate trust for the wife absolutely if she should survive her husband. There was no express disposition of the income of the trust funds during the remainder of the wife's life after her husband's death.

In 1883 Harold Reeves consulted Hugh Browne, a solicitor in partnership with his brother Arthur Browne, as to the security of the trust funds then in the hands of James Walker and Bernard E. James, the original trustees. It was arranged that James Walker should retire, and Arthur Robert Reeves (father of the actor Kynaston Reeves) be appointed in his place, and, as his solicitor, Hugh Browne obtained, in June 1884, an examination of the securities alleged by Bernard James to represent the trust funds. Hugh Browne came to the conclusion that they were forgeries. Under judicious pressure Bernard James was induced from time to time to pay all the trust funds by installments into a bank in the joint names of himself and Arthur Robert Reeves, the proposed new trustee, and from time to time to draw moneys out of this account for the purpose of investment upon mortgages found by Hugh Browne. In February and March 1884 sums amounting to £9200 were so drawn out and invested by Hugh Browne, as he alleged, at the instigation and with the approval of Harold Reeves, Mrs. Reeves, and Arthur Robert Reeves, upon the mortgage of houses in course of erection by speculative builders.

In May 1884 Arthur Robert Reeves and Marian Reeves were appointed trustees of the settlement in place of James Walker and Bernard James.

In 1885 Harold Reeves died, leaving two children, and before the commencement of this action Ellen Jane Reeves married William Patrick Mara. This action was commenced on the 7th Nov. 1890 by Ellen Jane Mara and her two infant children, Arthur Robert Reeves and Marian Reeves, against Hugh Browne and Arthur Browne, to make them liable for the losses which had resulted from the investments on builders’ mortgages.

The issue of the writ was more than six years after the date of the last mortgage complained of, but less than six years after the death of Harold Reeves.

== Judgment ==
=== High Court ===
Held, on the evidence, that Hugh Browne had made himself responsible as trustee for the investments, and not merely acted as agent for the trustees; that he had acted for the firm throughout, and therefore Michael Browne was liable as his partner; that Mrs. Mara had not requested or instigated the improper investments within the meaning of the Trustee Act 1893 (56 & 57 Vict. c. 53), s. 45, and her interest could not be impounded.

Held also, that, if the settlement had given Mrs. Mara an interest for life, the Statute of Limitations would have barred her action, but that, as the settlement only gave her an interest during the joint lives of herself and her husband, and her present interest was the life estate by way of resulting trust which came into her possession only on her husband's death, the statute did not begin to run against her until his death, and her action was not barred.

It was decided by North, J. (72 L. T. Rep. 765) that the defendants were liable.

=== Court of Appeal ===
Hugh Browne in all that he did acted in the capacity of solicitor for one of the two trustees, whose directions as to investments were accepted or acted on by the other; that under these circumstances he could not be made liable as a constructive trustee: and that it was too late to make him liable as solicitor. Held also, that it was not within the scope of the implied authority of a partner in a solicitor's business to constitute himself a constructive trustee so as to bind a partner and make him also liable as a constructive trustee, although he was not aware of the dealings by which the constructive trust was established.

Held, (reversing the decision of North, J., [1895] 2 Ch. 69), therefore, that neither of the defendants could be held liable as a constructive trustee, and that the appeal must be allowed, and the action dismissed with costs.
