= Re Rose =

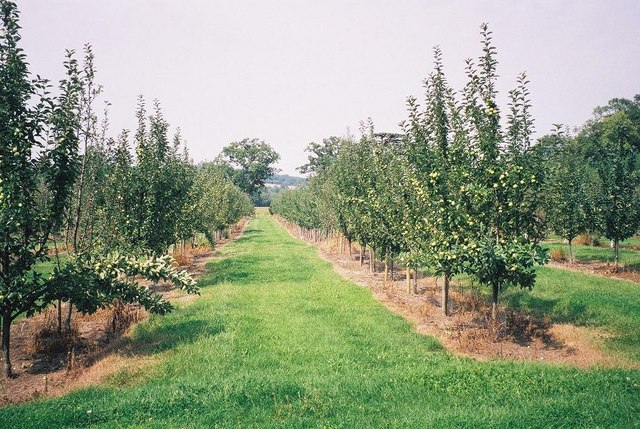
- Orchard in Leweston
- Court: Court of Appeal
- Full case name: ROSE and OTHERS v THE COMMISSIONERS OF INLAND REVENUE
- Citations: [1952] EWCA Civ 4 [1952] Ch 499

Court membership
- Judges sitting: Sir Raymond Evershed; Lord Justice Jenkins; Lord Justice Morris

Keywords
- Beneficial transfer of property; imperfect gift; specific performance

Re Rose [1952] EWCA Civ 4 is a case in English trusts law and English property law. It established that if a donor has done everything that can be expected of him to transfer legal title, but the transfer is delayed by the routine operation of the law then the gift is still effective. This is sometimes called the "Re Rose principle", or the "every effort rule".

== Facts ==
Mr Eric Rose wished to transfer shares in the Leweston Estates Co to Mrs Rose, in consideration of her love and affection. He filled in the share transfer forms on 30 March 1943, and handed them to the Mrs Rosamond Rose, who gave them to the company. The company directors could refuse to register share transfers. But the company registered the claimants as shareholders in Mr Rose’s place on 30 June 1943. Mr Rose died on 16 February 1947. The Inland Revenue wished to charge a tax, estate duty, on the transfer. It claimed the gift was not effected before 10 April 1943, so the tax was due. This was the relevant date under the Customs and Inland Revenue Act 1881 section 38(2)(a), the Customs and Inland Revenue Act 1889 section 11(1) and the Finance Act 1894 (57 & 58 Vict. c. 30) section 2(1)(c). If, however, the transfer took place in March, no tax would be due.

== Judgment ==
The Court of Appeal held that the transfer took place in March, meaning the taxes were not due. Although legal title passed to the claimants only when the shares were finally registered by the company, the beneficial title passed as soon as Mr Rose completed the share transfer forms. Once he did this he was not at liberty to merely cancel the transfer, and so when he handed away the forms, the shares were held on constructive trust.

Lord Evershed MR distinguished Milroy v Lord on the basis that there, Thomas Medley could have himself done more to ensure that the transfer was completed, because he did not merely need to leave Samuel Lord with an (unexercised) power of attorney to register the share transfer. Here the donor (Mr Rose) had done everything in his power that he had needed to do to make the transfer effective.

Jenkins LJ and Morris LJ both concurred, with the former delivering a concurring judgment.

== See also ==
- English trusts law
- Pennington v Waine [2002] EWCA Civ 227
- T Choithram International SA v Pagarani [2000] UKPC 46
