= Archibald Levin Smith =

British judge and rower

The Right Honourable Sir Archibald Levin Smith
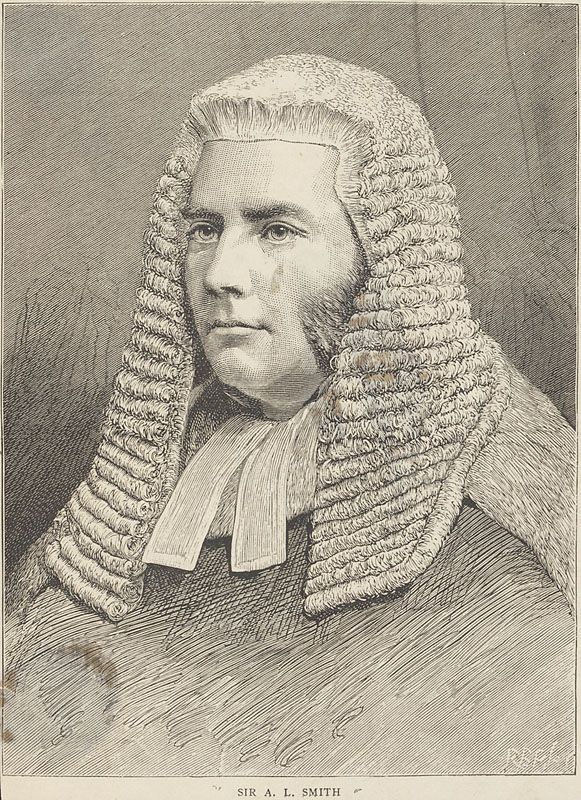

Master of the Rolls
- In office 1900–1901
- Preceded by: The Lord Alverstone
- Succeeded by: Sir Richard Collins

Lord Justice of Appeal

Justice of the High Court

Personal details
- Born: 28 August 1836
- Died: 20 October 1901 (aged 65)
- Spouse: Isobel Fletcher
- Children: 7
- Education: Eton College; Trinity College, Cambridge
- Occupation: Judge
- Profession: Barrister

Sir Archibald Levin Smith (26 August 1836 – 20 October 1901) was a British judge and a rower who competed at Henley and in the Oxford and Cambridge Boat Race.

== Biography ==
Smith was the son of Francis Smith, J.P. of Salt Hill, Chichester and his wife Mary Ann Levin. He was baptised at New Fishbourne, West Sussex although his mother was the daughter of a Polish-Jewish immigrant. He was educated at Eton and Trinity College, Cambridge. He suffered from the pituitary disorder, acromegaly, which caused him to grow to nearly 7 feet (2.1 m) tall. Athletic as well as tall, he rowed for Cambridge in the Oxford and Cambridge Boat Race in the 1857, 1858 and 1859 races. Oxford won in 1857 and Cambridge in 1858. In 1858 he was in the winning crews at Henley Royal Regatta in the Grand Challenge Cup with the C.U.B.C. and in the Visitors Challenge Cup and the Wyfold Challenge Cup with First Trinity Boat Club.

In the 1859 Boat Race "the race was rowed in a gale of wind, and the Cambridge boat filled and sank between Barnes Bridge and the finish.... Smith alone of the Cambridge oarsmen could not swim, and sat stolidly rowing until, when the water was up to his neck, he was rescued." In later years he regularly bet a new hat on the Boat Race with W.B. Woodgate "on principle and from patriotism to his flag, even when public favour and market odds might seem to be dead against the hopes of his own club."

Smith was admitted at the Inner Temple on 27 May 1856 and was called to the Bar on 17 November 1860. He was engaged on the Home Circuit and became Judge of the High Court of Justice (Queen's Bench Division) in 1883. He was then knighted and became an honorary bencher. In 1892 he became Lord Justice of Appeal, in which capacity he ruled on the famous case of Carlill v Carbolic Smoke Ball Co. On 24 October 1900 became Master of the Rolls, a position he held for almost a year until his resignation a few days before his death.

Smith was a keen amateur cricketer and a member of Marylebone Cricket Club (MCC) for whom he played in two matches 1861 to 1864. He was a right-handed batsman who scored 16 runs with a highest score of 7.

He was appointed Chairman of the Historical Manuscript Commission in March 1901.

== Family and death ==
He married, in 1867, Isobel Fletcher, daughter of John Charles Fletcher, of Dale Park, Sussex, and had sons Archibald, Geoffrey and Ralph, and daughters Isabel, Elinor, Winnifred and Marjorie. Smith lived at Salt Hill, Chichester, and 40 Cadogan Place, London.

Lady Smith drowned in the River Spey in August 1901, during a visit to the estate of their son-in-law J. W. H. Grant, in Aberlour, Morayshire. Sir Archibald fell ill and also died in Aberlour less than two months later, on 20 October 1901, at the age of 65. He is buried in the churchyard at Knockando.

Their younger son Geoffrey Smith also drowned, at Rosherville, near Johannesburg, South Africa, in August 1902, at 29 years old.

== Judgments ==
- Carlill v Carbolic Smoke Ball Company [1892] EWCA Civ 1, [1893] 1 QB 256, [1892] 2 QB 484 (QBD) - an advertisement containing certain terms to get a reward constituted a binding unilateral offer that could be accepted by anyone who performed its terms.
- Mara v Browne [1895]
- Groves v Lord Wimborne [1898] 2 Q.B. 402 - breach of a duty to fence off machinery (under the Factory and Workshop Act 1878) could give rise to civil as well as criminal liability in the absence of a clear statutory intent to the contrary.

== Public inquiries ==
- Parnell Commission

== See also ==
- List of Cambridge University Boat Race crews

Legal offices
Preceded by Lord Alverstone	Master of the Rolls; 1900–1901	Succeeded by Sir Richard Collins
