= Re K (decd) =

English legal case about severance of tenancy

Re K deceased
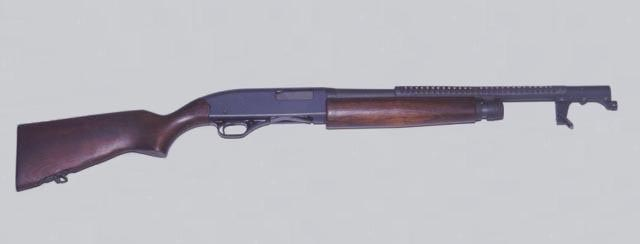
- Court: Court of Appeal
- Full case name: In re K deceased
- Decided: 8 May 1985
- Citations: [1986] Ch 180 [1985] 3 WLR 234 [1985] 2 All ER 833

Case history
- Prior action: Appellant also failed in the High Court before Vinelott J ([1985] Ch 85; [1985] 2 WLR 262; [1985] 1 All ER 403)
- Subsequent action: none

Court membership
- Judges sitting: Ackner LJ; Griffiths LJ; Browne-Wilkinson LJ

Case opinions
- the forfeiture rule unless [on the facts] modified under the Act of 1982 applies in effect to sever the joint tenancy

Keywords
- Co-ownership; administration of estates; manslaughter of the testator; forfeiture of beneficiary; statutory modification

Re K [1985] Ch 180 is an English land law case of acts of severance of a joint tenancy (one of two forms of co-ownership of land).

== Facts ==
A wife had been suffering severe domestic violence. In one of her husband's uncontrollable rages he had followed her into a room and she picked up a loaded shotgun and took off the safety catch, merely intending to threaten him. Unintentionally she shot and killed her husband. She was charged with murder but convicted of manslaughter instead, and got put on probation. He had bequeathed £1000 to her. His will left her nothing else. The questions were:

1. Whether she could benefit from survivorship (i.e. was there still a joint tenancy) and to the Will-bequeathed £1000 given the common law forfeiture rule
2. Whether she would be entitled to relief from forfeiture.

== Judgement ==
Mr Justice John Vinelott held the threat of violence was serious enough for forfeiture. As this pre-dated the manslaughter she stood to lose absolutely his half-share in the property. Although the events were before the passing of the Forfeiture Act 1982, forfeiture was not precluded – for the confiscation the court had . Severance occurs if one beneficiary unlawfully kills another.

Taking into account their conduct and the wife’s financial position it was just for the wife to be relieved from forfeiture.

the forfeiture rule unless modified under the Act of 1982 applies in effect to sever the joint tenancy in the proceeds of sale and in the rents and profits until sale.

== On appeal ==
The Court of Appeal unanimously upheld the decision of Vinelott J.

== Cases applied ==
- R v Chief National Insurance Comr, Ex parte Connor [1981] QB 758
- Gray v Barr (Prudential Assurance Co Ltd Third Party) [1971] 2 QB 554

== See also ==
- English trusts law
- English land law
- English property law
