= John Mee (poet) =

Canadian-Irish poet and law academic (born 1965)

- Born: 1965 (age 60–61)
- Writing career
- Genre: Poetry

John Mee (born 1965) is a Canadian-Irish poet and law academic currently (as of October 2021) lecturing at University College Cork. In 2015, Mee won the Patrick Kavanaugh award and the Fool for Poetry Chapbook in 2016. His work has been published in magazines such as Magma, The London Magazine, The North, The Cork Literary Review, Big Wide Words, Poetry on the Buses (London), THE SHOp, Cyphers, Southword, The Rialto and Prelude. Mee has also been published by the Irish Examiner and The Quarryman.

As a law academic, Professor John Mee is a graduate of UCC (BCL 1986; LLM 1987), Osgoode Hall Law School, Toronto (LLM 1989) and Trinity College Dublin (PhD 1997) and was called to the Irish Bar in 1990. He began lecturing in the UCC Law Department, in 1989 and was Dean of the Faculty of Law at UCC from 1999-2000.

Born in 1965, Mee moved from Canada to Ireland aged 7, he began writing poetry in 1990. He cites Elizabeth Bishop, Robert Lowell and Sinead Morrissey as his favourite poets. In 2008 he was selected for the "Poetry Ireland" series.

Mee's academic research largely focuses on equity and trusts, family property and the law of real property.

Fellow Cork-based poet Thomas McCarthy described Mee as possessing, 'A beautiful formality of language, a keen sense of irony, a consciousness of the music of history, all combine here in this rich work of poetry. Mee is one of the most gifted poets of the South to emerge in recent decades.'

He is a brother of Irish comedian Michael Mee.
