= Bank of Louisiana =

- U.S. National Register of Historic Places
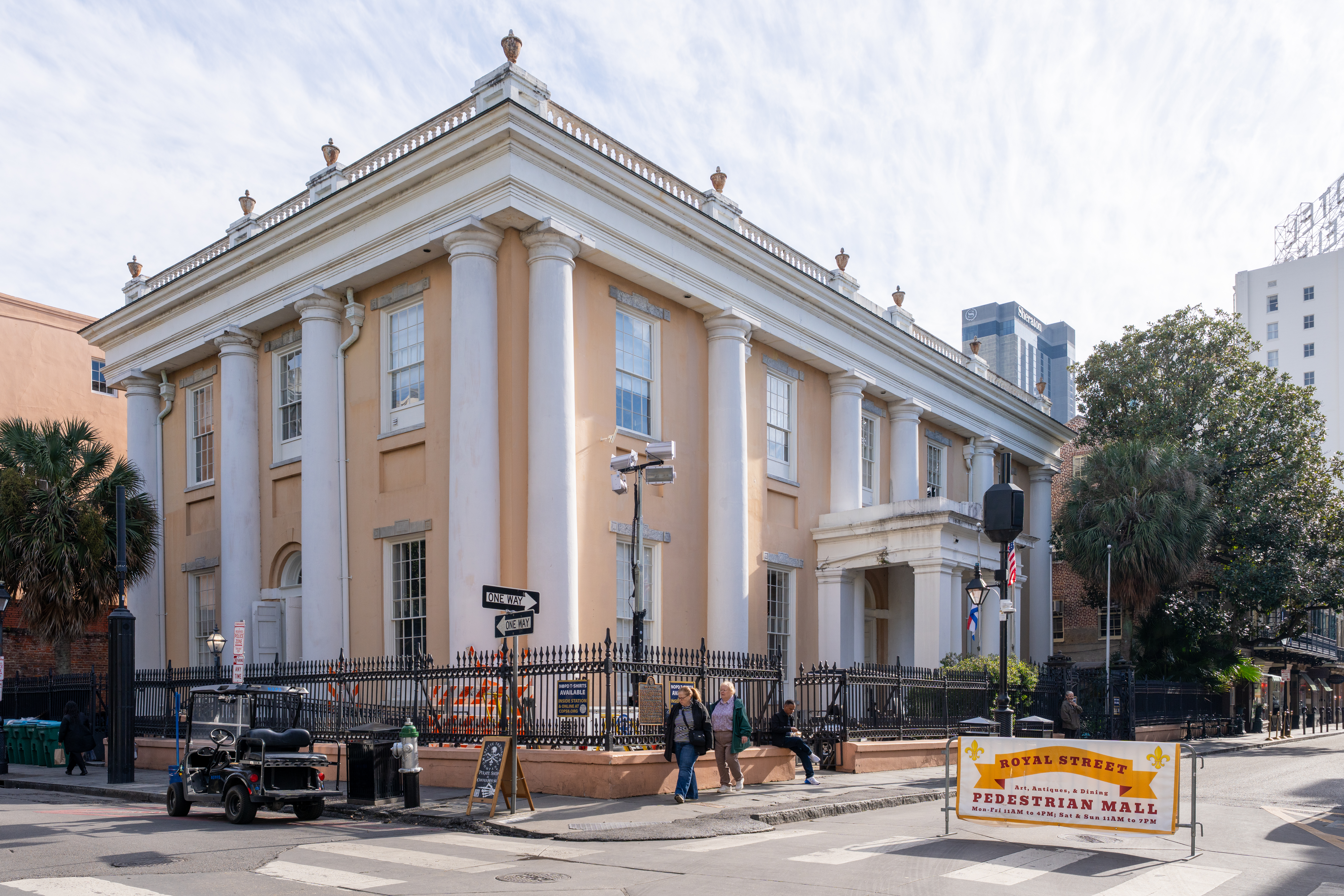

- Location within East New Orleans Location within Louisiana Location within the United States
- Location: 334 Royal St., New Orleans, Louisiana
- Coordinates: 29°57′21″N 90°4′0″W
- Area: less than one acre
- Built: 1826-27, 1873
- Architect: Bickle, Hamlet & Fox, James Gallier
- NRHP reference No.: 73000870
- Added to NRHP: June 19, 1973

The Bank of Louisiana building is located at 334 Royal Street in the French Quarter of New Orleans, Louisiana. It was added to the National Register of Historic Places in 1973.

It was designed by architects Bickle, Hamlet & Fox and completed in 1826. After a fire, the bank was repaired in 1863 under architect James Gallier.

It is a two-story brick masonry building, with exterior coated with smooth cement stucco and painted. It has full-height engaged Doric columns with capitals which support a classic cornice, which was once surmounted by a balustrade, behind which was the hipped roof. Its interior has Ionic pilasters.

The property is enclosed by "a fine iron fence and gates".

In 2011 it was serving as a police sub-station with a tourist information desk.
