= Strong v Bird =

English property law case

Strong v Bird [1874] LR 18 Eq 315 is an English property law case. It is an exception to the maxim: Equity will not assist a volunteer.

== Facts ==
Bird borrowed £1,100 from his stepmother. She was living with him and paying him rent. It was agreed by both parties that the loan was to be repaid by a reduction in the rent, until the loan was settled. Bird's stepmother only paid the reduced rent twice. Thereafter, she paid the full rent until her death.

On her death, she appointed Bird as her executor and the next of kin now attempted to recover the debt from Bird. The conduct of his stepmother (stopped paying the reduced rent as per their agreement) does not discharge the debt at law because there was no consideration provided for the release. The issue was whether Bird must pay back the loan.

== Judgment ==
The appointment of Bird as the executor was evidence that the loan to Bird was a gift to him. This is because the executor is responsible for calling in debts to the testator's estate. It would be ridiculous for the executor to sue himself for the debt. Therefore, common law rulings cancelled the debt to avoid this anomaly. Furthermore, the stepmother's donative intention had continued until her death.

== Significance ==
When a donor makes an imperfect gift during his lifetime, and the donee is subsequently appointed as the donor's executor or becomes the donor's administrator on intestacy, the gift is perfected because the donee obtains legal title to the donor's property, including the subject matter of the intended gift, in the donee's capacity as executor or administrator.

There are four conditions for the rule in Strong v Bird:

1. The donor must have intended to make an inter vivos gift.
2. Such donative intention must have persisted until the donor's death.
3. The donee is appointed the donor's executor (or administrator, Re James [1935] 1 Ch 449)
4. The subject matter of the intended gift must have been capable of enduring the death of the donor.

In Re James, Farwell J said, "The defendant by her appointment as one of the administratrices has got the legal estate vested in her and she needs no assistance from equity to complete her title. Under these circumstances she cannot be compelled at the suit of persons claiming through the donor to surrender her property. It follows that in my judgment the plaintiff here must recognize the title of the defendant to the property and no steps should be taken to recover it from her."

== See also ==
- English trusts law
- Maxims of equity
- English property law
