= T Choithram International SA v Pagarani =

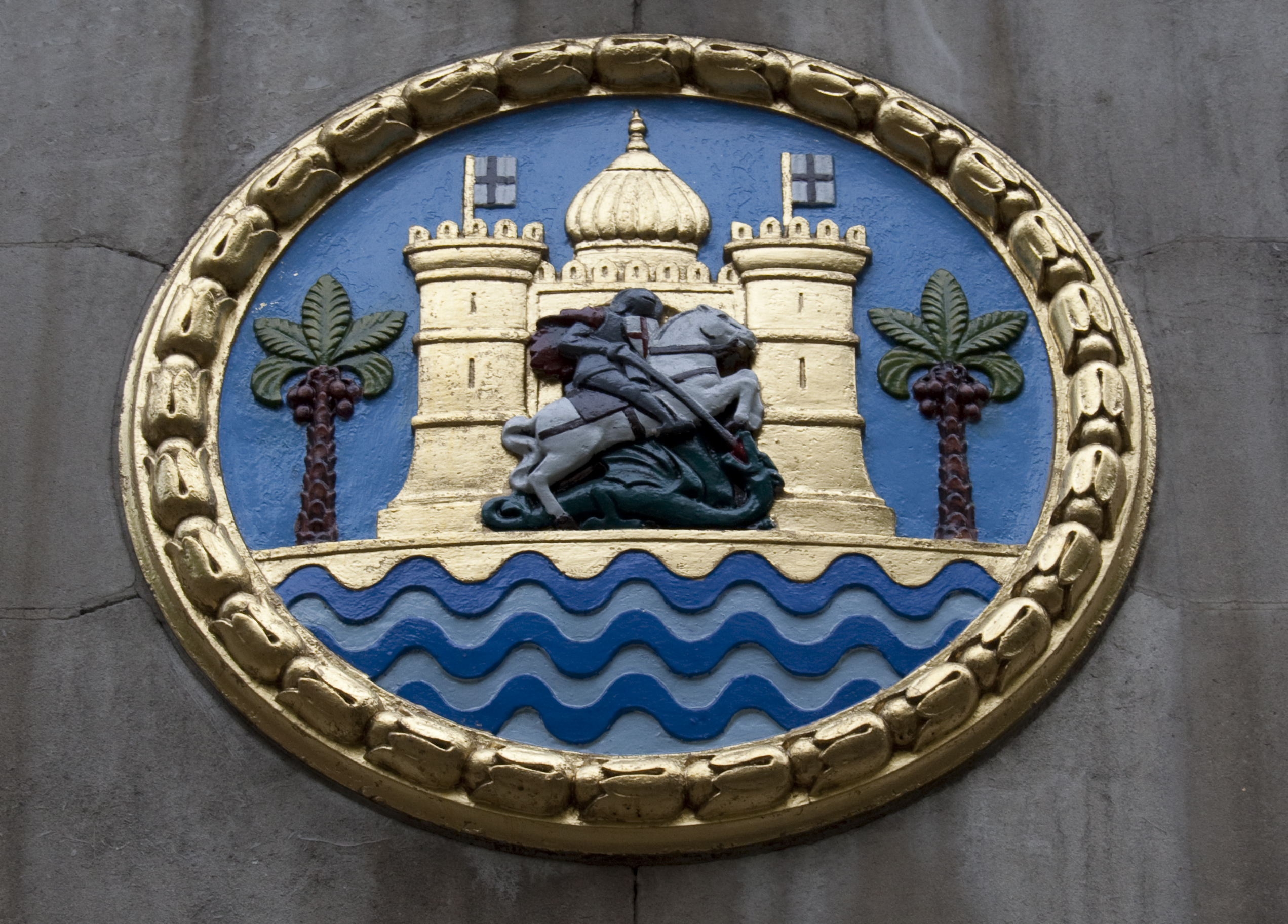
- Court: Privy Council
- Citations: [2000] UKPC 46 [2001] 1 WLR 1 [2001] 2 All ER 492

Court membership
- Judges sitting: Lord Browne-Wilkinson; Lord Jauncey of Tullichettle; Lord Clyde; Lord Hobhouse of Woodborough; Lord Millett

Case opinions
- Lord Browne-Wilkinson

Keywords
- Formality, express trusts

T Choithram International SA v Pagarani [2000] UKPC 46 was a decision of the Judicial Committee of the Privy Council on appeal from the British Virgin Islands in relation to the vesting of trust property in a trustee.

== Facts ==
Mr Thakurdas Choithram Pagarani wanted to start a foundation called the Choithram International Foundation. He was dying of cancer. He drew up a trust deed, including himself a trustee. He travelled from his business based in Dubai and had a ceremony at his son's home in London. On 17 February 1992, with people gathered at his bedside, Mr Pagarani announced he was transferring his money to a Jersey trust for his proposed philanthropic foundation. Witnesses differed in the precise words, but the generally accepted substance as to what he was thought to have said was: "I now give all my wealth to the Trust" or "I have given everything to the Trust". Mr Pagarani executed the trust deed in front of three trustees (who also signed), his accountant and the First Secretary of the Indian High Commission. He told the group accountant, Mr Param, that he knew what to do to transfer all balances to the foundation. There were to be three more trustees (who signed shortly afterwards), and Mr Pagarani himself was to be a seventh trustee. Those present testified that Mr Pagarani made an immediate absolute gift to the Foundation of all his shareholdings and credit balances in four British Virgin Island companies. But then he died before actually executing the documents to transfer legal title to the assets to the trustees. Some of his children contended the gift was imperfect and unenforceable. The four BVI companies in fact altered the share registers later the same day. Mr Pagarani had also prepared a will, but had not signed it. The share transfer documents were also unsigned by Mr Pagarani. The relatives who were trustees of the Foundation claimed that the gift to the Foundation was valid, and that the shares in the companies had not been transferred properly in the manner specified by law in the International Business Companies Act. Other people who stood to inherit challenged the foundation's claim.

== Advice ==
=== Court of Appeal ===
The Court of Appeal of the British Virgin Islands, upholding the judge at first instance, held that the trust failed. It took the view that a perfected gift could only be made in one of two ways, viz.

1. by a transfer of the gifted asset to the donee, accompanied by an intention in the donor to make a gift; or
2. by the donor declaring himself to be a trustee of the gifted property for the donee.

In case 1 above, the donor must have done everything necessary to be done which is within his own power to do in order to transfer the gifted asset to the donee. If the donor has not done so, the gift is incomplete since the donee has no equity to perfect an imperfect gift, for which there is a long line of authority. Moreover, the court will not give a benevolent construction so as to treat ineffective words of outright gift as taking effect as if the donor had declared himself a trustee for the donee, see Milroy v Lord (1862) 4 De G F & J 264.

So in this case Mr Pagarani used words of gift to the Foundation (not words declaring himself a trustee) – unless he transferred the shares and deposits so as to vest title in all the Trustees, he had not done all that he could in order to effect the gift; so under the law as it had previously been understood, the gift would have failed. Further it would not be possible to treat Mr Pagarani's words of gift as a declaration of trust, because they make no reference to trusts. Therefore, if the case does not fall within either of the possible methods by which a complete gift can be made, then the gift should have failed.

=== Privy Council ===
Lord Browne-Wilkinson delivered the advice of the Privy Council.

The Privy Council advised that the fairness required by equity meant the fact that the trust property was vested in one trustee (Mr Pagarani himself) at the time of the gift was sufficient to make the conveyance to the trust valid. Lord Browne-Wilkinson said the most important question was this: on the basis that Mr Pagarani intended to make an immediate absolute gift "to the Foundation", but had not vested the gifted property in all the trustees of the Foundation, are the trusts of the Foundation trust deed enforceable against the deposits and the shares, or was it (as the judge at first instance and the Court of Appeal had held) a case where there has been an imperfect gift which cannot be enforced against Mr Pagarani's estate whatever his intentions might have been?

It expressed "some doubt" whether Bridge v Bridge had been correctly decided when it said that vesting of property in one trustee among many was insufficient, but they distinguished the case on technical grounds.

== Significance ==
Most academic commentary was to the effect that the decision made new law, notwithstanding the comments of the Privy Council to the contrary. Suggestions have also been made to the effect that the Privy Council was prepared to bend the law to prevent the intention of the donor being frustrated, and the charitable foundation losing such a large bequest. The logic behind the decision is slightly fuzzy, relying more upon notions of fairness than legal rules, and it has been questioned in some quarters whether it would be followed in similar less clear cut circumstances. One commentator has suggested politely that in the decision "the courts are not entirely consistent with their message in relation to equity's power to perfect imperfect gifts".

Background

Mr Pagarani was born in 1914 in India. He was a devout Hindu. In 1928 he married his first wife, Lalibai Thakurdas Pagarani, by whom he had six daughters. In about 1937 Mr Pagarani left India and eventually established a supermarket business in Sierra Leone, Lalibai and their children remaining in India. In Sierra Leone he met and in 1944 married Virginia Harding. They had eight children together, including three sons. Mr Pagarani remained in Sierra Leone until the 1980s but used to return to India to visit his Indian family and those members of his Sierra Leone family whom he had taken to India to be brought up according to Indian ways and customs. The businesses carried on by Mr Pagarani were outstandingly successful and spread widely throughout the world. They were usually named "T. Choithram and Sons" and were often known simply as "Choithrams". In 1989 Mr Pagarani brought most of his business under the umbrella of the first various offshore companies (including T Choithram International SA), in effect, holding companies. He was not the sole owner of the shares in those companies, but he held a majority share.

Throughout his life Mr Pagarani gave to charity, amounting to more than a million US dollars. The judge at first instance found as a fact that:

... having made generous provision for his first wife and each of his children, [he] intended to leave much of the remainder of his wealth to charity, to the exclusion of his children. This he hoped to achieve by setting up a foundation to serve as an umbrella organisation for those charities which he had already established and which would in due course be the vehicle to receive most of his assets when he died. This was from all accounts, a longstanding intention of the deceased.

== See also ==
- English trusts law
