= Maxims of equity =

Principles that govern the operation of equity within English law

Maxims of equity or equitable maxims are legal maxims that serve as a set of general principles or rules that illustrate the way in which equity operates.

== Theory ==
Equitable maxims are legal maxims that serve as a set of general principles or rules that illustrate the way in which equity operates as derived from case law. They tend to illustrate the qualities of equity, in contrast to the common law, as a more flexible approach. They were developed by the English Court of Chancery and other courts that administer equitable jurisdiction.

Historically, the use of legal maxims was popular in the common law courts as well as those of equity. The law of trusts, for example, was developed in the chancery courts on the basis that equity would not suffer a wrong to be without remedy where one has conveyed land to another for the use of a third party but where the new legal owner acts to benefit himself instead. However, judicial reasoning in contemporary common-law jurisdictions has largely moved past the paradigm of presenting maxims as the general bases upon which legal arguments are built.

Legal academics have further argued that the use of such maxims are more harmful than helpful, on the basis that they are trite, mysterious, reductivist, simplistic, or too narrow. Equitable maxims are now most frequently invoked where the law is uncertain and where judges wish to invoke broad legal principles or ethical standards in justifying and directing case law.

== List ==
Modern texts recognise the existence of roughly a dozen equitable maxims, including:

1. Equity will not suffer a wrong to be without a remedy
2. Equity follows the law
3. Where there is equal equity, the law prevails
4. He who seeks equity must do equity
5. He who comes into equity must come with clean hands
6. Equity aids the vigilant and not the indolent
7. Equity is equality
8. Equity looks to the intent rather than to the form
9. Equity regards as done that which ought to be done
10. Equity imputes an intention to fulfil an obligation
11. Equity acts in personam

The 25th Edition of Snell's Equity (1960), an English treatise, takes the view that all the equitable maxims have broad similarities and can be reduced into merely two: 'Equity will not suffer a wrong to be without a remedy' and 'Equity acts in personam'.

=== Equity will not suffer a wrong to be without a remedy ===
Conventional theories of the rule of law argue that it requires the law to provide for the enforcement of legal rights. In the common law, as such, the Latin legal maxim, ubi jus ibi remedium ("where there is a right there must be a remedy"), has been cited as a fundamental principle of constitutional law, as in the case of Ashby v White. The general principle provides a historical and normative basis for the intervention of the jurisdiction of equity, as encapsulated in the equitable maxim, "Equity will not suffer a wrong to be without a remedy".

Related historical maxims of equity in Latin include "aequitas sequitur legem" (equity follows the law), "ius respicit aequitatem" (law respects equity), and "aequitas nunquam contravenit leges" (equity never opposes the law).

==== Equity follows the law ====
As Snell's Equity, the leading textbook on equity in English law, notes, this "aequitas sequitur legem" maxim contradicts the previous ubi ius maxim, as the courts of equity did not actually follow the decisions of their common law counterparts.

A historically popular view espoused by judges, legal historians, and academics has been that equity complements or supplements the common law but does not depart from, override, or contradict it. According to this theory, the rules of equity were historically developed by the equitable courts in exceptional circumstances where the common law was defective, with Frederic Maitland claiming, referencing Matthew 5:17-18, that "Equity had come not to destroy the law, but to fulfil it. Every jot and every tittle of law was to be obeyed, but when all this had been done yet something might be needful, something that equity would require."

Modern legal historians and scholars, however, generally reject this view as simplistic, ahistorical, and doctrinally incorrect. There were, historically, many examples where doctrines of equity did not supplement the common law but were contradictory to it. In the United Kingdom, the applicability of the maxim has been restricted by the Senior Courts Act 1981, which states:

[W]herever there is any conflict or variance between the rules of equity and the rules of the common law with reference to the same matter, the rules of equity shall prevail.

The maxim, nonetheless, continues to be applied by the courts, for example, in the case of Stack v Dowden.

== As normative justification ==
=== Laches ===
Equity aids the vigilant, not the indolent. The equitable rule of laches and acquiescence was first introduced in Chief Young Dede v. African Association Ltd.

The maxim is alternatively expressed as 'delay defeats equity' and 'equity aids the vigilant, not those who sleep on their rights', or, in Latin, as vigilantibus non dormientibus aequitas subvenit.

=== Priority ===
This maxim states: "Where there is equal equity, the law [or the first in time] shall prevail", relating to legal priority.

=== Illegality, immorality, and clean hands ===
The concept that equity only assists those who conduct themselves equitably is reflected in the maxims "he who seeks equity must do equity" and "he who comes into equity must come with clean hands". Whereas the former refers to the obligations of parties to conduct themselves equitably in the future, the latter refers to the court's refusal to permit relief to parties who come into litigation without "clean hands" or with "dirty hands".

According to the first maxim, where a claimant has brought a claim in equity against the defendant, the court will only award relief where the claimant would also uphold their obligations to the defendant if relief would be condition precedent upon the claimant's performance. Where, for example, one brings a claim in equity to bind another to honour an agreement, they may have to uphold their end of the bargain as well.

The second maxim is analogous to the common law maxim, ex turpi causa non oritur actio ("from a bad cause no action can arise"). The maxim in equity seeks to prevent parties who have taken advantage of the situation in an immoral manner from being awarded equitable relief. Typically, the immoral character of a party's actions involves some element of dishonesty, unfairness, abuse, unjust enrichment, criminality, or other misconduct. The doctrine does not, however, require the "suitors shall have led blameless lives", as famously expressed by US Supreme Court justice Louis Brandeis. Rather, the maxim reflects the principle that a "court never allows a man to make profit by a wrong", as stated by Lord Chancellor Hatherley (1801-1881).

== Effect on remedies ==
=== Equity is equality ===
Aequitas est quasi aequalitas.

=== Equity looks on as done that which ought to have been done ===
Aequitas factum habet quod fieri oportuit.

The case of Walsh v Lonsdale is often cited as the basis of this maxim.

- Risk of loss
- Real estate
- Equitable interest
- Specific performance

=== Equity does not punish ===
Lord Justice James stated in Vyse v. Foster (Ch.App. 1871) that "This Court is not a Court of penal jurisdiction. It compels restitution of property unconscientiously withheld; it gives full compensation for any loss or damage through failure of some equitable duty; but it has no power of punishing anyone."

This is largely because equity is civil rather than criminal in nature. Criminal equity formerly existed in the infamous Star Chamber, but ceased to exist when that court was abolished. As such, equity generally will not enjoin a crime or a criminal proceeding. As stated in Mayor of York v. Pilkington (Ch. 1742), the Court of Chancery "has not originally, and strictly, any restraining power over criminal prosecutions".

This maxim means that punitive or exemplary damages are generally not available in equity, at least historically. The U.S. Supreme Court reiterated this principle as a limit on restitution in Liu v. Securities and Exchange Commission (2020), citing the "equitable principle that the wrongdoer should not be punished by 'pay[ing] more than a fair compensation to the person wronged.' Tilghman v. Proctor, 125 U.S. 136, 145–146 (1888)."

=== Equity does not act in vain ===
Equity does not require relief to be granted where it would be an idle gesture (alternatively, equity does not act in vain). Accordingly, courts will deny injunctive relief where the order would lack practical effect to be futile. Arguments of futility are common in cases where a subject matter can't be protected by a judicial order, where the defendant is unable or unwilling to comply, and where the defendant's compliance cannot be enforced. For example, courts will not order a defendant to respect a plaintiff's confidence if the relevant information has reached the public domain.

The same applies to breaches of privacy, as in Mosley v News Group Newspapers Ltd where the court of the Queen's Bench declined to order award relief to Max Mosley after the News of the World reported his participation in a sadomasochistic sex party, which it falsely alleged had a Nazi theme. In her judgement, Eady J stated:

Even though an order may be desirable for the protection of privacy, and may be made in accordance with the principles currently being applied by the courts, there may come a point where it would simply serve no useful purpose and would merely be characterised, in the traditional terminology, as a brutum fulmen. It is inappropriate for the Court to make vain gestures.

=== Equity will not assist a volunteer ===
A volunteer is defined in equity as one who has not offered consideration for a benefit they have received or expect to receive. For example, if a person A expects from past conversations and friendship to receive property under any will of person B, but person B dies before writing this into their will, person A, having not made any contribution to person B, will not be able to seek equity's aid.

This maxim is very important in restitution. Restitution developed as a series of writs called special assumpsit, which were later additions to the courts of law and were more flexible tools of recovery based on equity. Restitution could provide a means of recovery when people bestowed benefits on one another (such as giving money or providing services) under contracts that would otherwise have been legally unenforceable.

=== Equity will not complete an imperfect gift ===
However, there are certain relaxations to the maxim, including the rule of Re Rose of where the donor has "done all in his power to divest himself of and to transfer" the property, and the more recent but controversial use of unconscionability as a method of dispensing a formality requirement.

Note the exception in Strong v Bird (1874) LR 18 Eq 315. If the donor appoints the intended donee as executor of their will and subsequently dies, equity will perfect the imperfect gift.

== See also ==
- Brocard (law)
- English trusts law
- Legal maxim
- List of legal Latin terms

== Notes ==
1. Hanbury & Martin: Modern Equity (23rd edn Sweet & Maxwell 2024) p 22 - 36
2. Edwards, Richard; Stockwell, Nigel (2005). Trusts and Equity (7 ed.). Pearson Education. p. 34. ISBN 1-4058-1227-3.
3. Snell's Equity (35th ed.). 5-003.
4. Snell's Equity (35th ed.). 5-001.
5. Snell, Edmund Henry Turner; Megarry, R.E.; Baker, P.V. (1960). Snell's Principles of Equity (25 ed.). London: Sweet & Maxwell. p. 24. OL 21567635M.
6. Hackney, Jeffrey (1987). Understanding Equity and Trusts. Fontana. p. 29. ISBN 0-00-686072-9.
7. Snell's Equity (35th ed.). Ch 5.
8. Hanbury & Martin: Modern Equity (23rd edn Sweet & Maxwell 2024) At 1-025 - 1-037
9. Albert Venn Dicey, Introduction to the Study of the Law of the Constitution, 5th ed (London: Macmillan and Co, 1897) Ch IV
10. "Ubi jus ibi remedium - Oxford Reference". www.oxfordreference.com.
11. Snell's Equity (35th ed.). 5-004.
12. Snell's Equity (35th ed.). 5-002.
13. "Maxims, Legal" . New International Encyclopedia. Vol. XIII. 1905. p. 210.
14. Snell's Equity (35th ed.). 5-006.
15. Story, Joseph; Randell, Alfred Edward (1920). Story on Equity (third English ed.). Sweet & Maxwell. p. 34.
16. Cardozo wrote in his dissent in Graf v. Hope Building Corporation, 254 N.Y 1 at 9 (1930), "Equity works as a supplement for law and does not supersede the prevailing law."
17. Snell, Edmund Henry Turner (1929). Snell's Principles of Equity (20 ed.). London: Sweet & Maxwell. p. 24. quoted in Williams, James (1932). The Statute of Frauds, p. 166.
18. Maitland (1909), p. 17.
19. Section 49(1)
20. "Senior Courts Act 1981: Section 49", legislation.gov.uk, The National Archives, 1981 c. 54 (s. 49)
21. Chief Young Dede v. African Association Ltd (1910) 1 N.L.R 130 at 133
22. Co. Litt 24.
23. Snell's Equity (35th ed.). 5-009.
24. Snell's Equity (35th ed.). 5-010 - 5-011.
25. Tinsley v Milligan [1993] UKHL 3, House of Lords (UK).
26. Herstein, Ori J. (September 2011). "A normative theory of the clean hands defense". Legal Theory. 17 (3): 171–208. doi:10.1017/S1352325211000152. ISSN 1352-3252.
27. D & C Builders Ltd v Rees [1965] EWCA Civ 3, Court of Appeal (England and Wales).
28. Precision Instrument Manufacturing Co. v. Automotive Co., 324 U.S. 806, 814 (1945). "While equity does not require that its suitors shall have led blameless lives as to other matters, it does require that they shall have acted without fraud or deceit as to the matter in issue.". See also McKennon v. Nashville Banner Publishing Co., 513 U.S. 352, 360 (1995)
29. Loughran v. Loughran, 292 U.S. 216, 229 (1934), (Brandeis, J.)
30. Jehon v Vivian (1876) Law Rep. 6 Ch. App. 742
31. Liu v. Securities and Exchange Commission (2020)
32. Cotterell, John N. (1913). A collection of latin maxims and phrases literally translated : intended for the use of students for all legal examinations. University of Illinois Urbana-Champaign. London : Stevens and Haynes.
33. Witzleb, Normann (2010). "'Equity does not act in vain': an analysis of futility arguments in claims for injunctions". Sydney Law Review. 32 (3): 503–531.
34. Mosley v News Group Newspapers Ltd [2008] EWHC 687 (QB).
35. Mann, Trischa (2013). Australian Law Dictionary 2nd ed. Australia: Oxford University Press. p. 756. ISBN 9780195518511.
36. Corin v Patton [1990] HCA 12, (1990) 169 CLR 540, High Court (Australia).
37. Re Rose [1952] Ch 499, 515
38. Pennington v Waine [2002] 4 All ER 215, [63]-[66]
