= Three certainties =

Rule within English trusts law

The three certainties compose a rule within English trusts law on the creation of express trusts that, to be valid, the trust instrument must show certainty of intention, subject matter and object. "Certainty of intention" means that it must be clear that the donor or testator wishes to create a trust; this is not dependent on any particular language used, and a trust can be created without the word "trust" being used, or even the donor knowing he is creating a trust. Since the 1950s, the courts have been more willing to conclude that there was intention to create a trust, rather than hold that the trust is void. "Certainty of subject matter" means that it must be clear what property is part of the trust. Historically the property must have been segregated from non-trust property; more recently, the courts have drawn a line between tangible and intangible assets, holding that with intangible assets there is not always a need for segregation. "Certainty of objects" means that it must be clear who the beneficiaries, or objects, are. The test for determining this differs depending on the type of trust; it can be that all beneficiaries must be individually identified, or that the trustees must be able to say with certainty, if a claimant comes before them whether; they are or are not a beneficiary.

There are four categories of uncertainty that can affect the validity of a trust: conceptual uncertainty, evidential uncertainty, ascertainability and administrative unworkability. "Conceptual uncertainty" is where the language is unclear, something which leads to the trust being declared invalid. "Evidential uncertainty" is where a question of fact, such as whether a claimant is a beneficiary, cannot be answered; this does not always lead to invalidity. "Ascertainability" is where a beneficiary cannot be found, while "administrative unworkability" is where the nature of the trust is such that it cannot realistically be carried out. Trustees and the courts have developed various ways of getting around uncertainties, including the appointment of experts to work out evidential uncertainty, and giving trustees the power to decide who is or is not a beneficiary.

The rule came out of the case of Knight v Knight. The testator, after giving away his personal and real property, added to the end of his will that "I trust to the justice of my successors, in continuing the estates in the male succession, according to the will of the founder of the family". Langdale MR, hearing the case, held that this was not specific enough to create a valid trust; furthermore, to be held as valid, trust instruments would have to have:

- Certainty of intention: it must be clear that the testator intends to create a trust
- Certainty of subject matter: it must be clear what property is part of the trust and property, including sum of money, cannot be separated.
- Certainty of objects: it must be clear who the beneficiaries (objects) are.

Note: The 'Three certainties' rule is not novel to Knight v Knight. It was first stated in Wright v Atkyns, by Earl Eldon LC.

== Certainty of intention ==
The first principle when deciding if there is certainty of intention is the nature of the language used; the words, as said in Wright v Atkyns, "must be imperative". Past this, there is no requirement that particular language be used. In Re Kayford, Megarry J held that "it is well settled that a trust can be created without using the word "trust" or "confidence" or the like; the question is whether in substance a sufficient intention to create a trust has been manifested". In Paul v Constance, it was held that the phrase "the money is as much yours as it is mine" was sufficient to translate to a trust. A trust will not be formed if it is clear that some other intention was there, such as the intention to make a pure gift, as in Jones v Lock. Historically, precatory words such as "it is hoped" and "it is desired" were held to be valid. Since Lambe v Eames, the courts have instead taken the approach that the circumstances and the reading of the statement as a whole are the factors, and that no particular words will impose a trust on their own.

It is possible to create an express trust without being aware that one is doing so, so long as the court can determine from the person's intention that a beneficial entitlement should be conferred which the law (or equity) will enforce. In the Constance case, Constance was described as a man of "unsophisticated character" who did not know he was creating a trust– nevertheless, the courts found that was what he had done. In Re Kayford, the company involved took actions to protect its customers by moving their funds into a separate bank account. Even though they had never indicated a desire to create a trust, their intention had been in line with the purpose of a trust, and thus it was considered valid. Many trusts are formed through wills, which create additional issues when determining intention. In Re Hamilton, Lindley LJ set out the standard rule that to "take the will you have to construe and see what it means, and if you come to the conclusion that no trust was intended you say so"; essentially that judges should not simply assume that there is a trust. This literal approach was followed until the 1950s; since then, the judiciary have been more willing to interpret trust documents in such a way as to make the trusts valid rather than void. According to Byrnes v Kendle, the question that needs to be answered in determining whether a certainty of intention exists is "What is the meaning of what the parties have said?" and not "What did the parties mean to say?"

== Certainty of subject matter ==
It is a requirement that the subject matter be certain — that the property intended to be in the trust be separated from other property, showing clarity in what is intended to be trust property. If there is no clear separation, the trust will fail, as in Re Goldcorp Exchange Ltd. This point was illustrated by Re London Wine Co (Shippers) Ltd, where creditors of a bankrupt wine trading company argued that they should be able to claim the wine they had paid for. The problem was that these bottles were not individually identifiable, and Oliver J held that:

I appreciate the point taken that the subject matter is a part of a homogeneous mass so that specific identity is of as little as importance as it is, for instance, in the case of money. Nevertheless, as it seems to me, to create a trust it must be possible to ascertain with certainty not only what the interest of the beneficiary is to be but to what property it is to attach.

A sum of money, say 10,000, does not satisfy the requirement, rendering uncertainty.

This is part of the "orthodox" or "strict" rule, along with Re Goldcorp. The exception to this rule is found in Hunter v Moss, which concerned 50 shares meant to be transferred to an employee out of a total holding of 950. These shares were not individually identified, but Dillon LJ held that this was irrelevant because the shares were all of the same type and in the same company, and so it made no difference which particular shares were transferred. This was applied in Re Harvard Securities, where Neuberger J held that there was a difference between tangible property, such as wine, and intangible property, such as shares. Intangible property, by its very nature, does not require segregation. A failure in the formality of this head would lead to the property being result back to the estate on resulting trust.

== Certainty of objects ==
There is a requirement that the beneficiaries of a trust, known as the objects, be certain. Within express trusts this is a particularly complex area, because the test used to determine certainty varies between fixed trusts, mere powers and discretionary trusts. Fixed trusts are trusts for a specific, named list of individuals, with Alastair Hudson giving the example of "£10,000 to be held upon trust equally for the complete team of 11 Sunderland Football Club players who started the 1992 Cup Final at Wembley". The test for fixed trusts is that the trustees must be able to give a complete list of the beneficiaries, as laid down in IRC v Broadway Cottages. If there are any potential beneficiaries who the trustees are not certain of, or the trustees cannot compile a complete list, the trust is void for uncertainty.

A more complex test is found with mere powers. These are where a person is granted the power (the ability) to exercise a trust-like power, but without any obligation to do so, such as "the trustee may give £1,000 to X", or "the trustee can, at his discretion, give £1,000 to X" as opposed to "the trustee shall give £1,000 to X". In Re Hay's ST, Megarry VC said that:

A mere power is very different [from an ordinary trust obligation]. Normally the trustee is not bound to exercise it, and the court will not compel him to do so. That, however, does not mean that he can simply fold his hands and ignore it, for normally he must from time to time consider whether or not to exercise the power, and the court may direct him to do this.

The holder of a mere power is therefore free to do what he wants with the property he holds; if he fails to consider his exercise of the power, the courts may force him to do so. The leading test for mere powers is the "any given postulant" test, laid down in Re Gulbenkian. This states that the trustees must be able to say with certainty, when a potential beneficiary comes before them, that he either is or is not a beneficiary.

Discretionary trusts are trusts which require that the trustees exercise their powers, in the same way as a fixed trust, but allow some discretion in how to do so, in a similar manner to mere powers. Since trustees hold the discretionary power to choose how to act under an established boundary set out by the settlor of a trust, evidential certainty is not relevant and does not affect discretionary trusts anyway. The leading test of certainty of objects here is also the "any given postulant test", applied to discretionary trusts in McPhail v Doulton. The courts attempted to mitigate this test in Re Baden’s Deed Trusts (no 2); however, all three judges of the Court of Appeal gave separate reasons. Stamp LJ had an approach based entirely on the facts, with no greater impact on certainty of objects. Sachs LJ took the approach that the burden of proof was on the claimants to prove they were beneficiaries, not on the trustees to prove the trust was valid. Megaw LJ, however, took the approach that a trust could be valid, even with uncertain beneficiaries, if there was a "core number" of beneficiaries who were certain.

== Uncertainty ==
Where there is not sufficient clarity, the trust may be held void as uncertain. The applicable forms of uncertainty have been categorised as:

1. Conceptual uncertainty.
2. Evidential uncertainty.
3. Ascertainability.
4. Administrative unworkability.

Conceptual uncertainty is the "most fundamental in the validity of a trust or power", and is where the language used in the trust is unclear. Examples include where familiar but overly vague terms are used, such as "good customers" or "useful employees"; if the concept cannot be certain, the trust fails. Evidential uncertainty, on the other hand, is where there is a question of fact that is impossible to answer, such as when a claimant cannot prove he is a beneficiary. This does not necessarily invalidate the trust, as Jenkins J (as he was then) said in Re Coxen:

I must keep in mind the distinction between uncertainty as to the events prescribed by the testator...in which the condition...is to operate (which is generally speaking fatal to the validity of such a condition) and difficulty in ascertaining whether those events...have happened or not, which is not necessarily fatal to such a validity.

The next type of uncertainty, ascertainability, is where it is impossible to find the beneficiaries, either because they have died, moved or changed names. This is not necessarily fatal; the test for deciding if it is or not was laid out by Wynn-Parry J as: "mere difficulty of ascertainment is not of itself fatal to the validity of the gift. As has been pointed out, it is a matter of degree, and it is only when one reaches, on the evidence, a conclusion that it is so vague or that the difficulty is so great that it must be treated as virtually incapable of resolution, that one is entitled, to my mind, to say that a gift of that nature is void for uncertainty". If a beneficiary cannot be found despite strenuous steps to find one, the trustees can apply for a Benjamin Order, named after the case of Re Benjamin, which authorises them to distribute the property as if the beneficiary is dead. The final type of uncertainty is administrative unworkability — where the trust is, by its very nature, so impractical that the trustees cannot carry out their duties. Where this prevents the trustees carrying out their duties, the trust will be declared invalid, and not applied.

== Resolving uncertainties ==
Drafters use three principal devices to resolve problems of potential uncertainty. These are:

1. To provide that an expert can give advice as to who is or is not a beneficiary;
2. to give the trustees power to decide who is or is not a beneficiary;
3. and to allow the trustees to grant property to almost anyone, hoping this will reduce the risk of uncertainty.

The first device has been approved by the courts: in Re Tuck's Settlement Trusts, Lord Denning allowed the court and trustees to engage a Chief Rabbi to determine whether a beneficiary's wife was "of the Jewish faith" which determined the beneficiary's eligibility to the trust. Though this condition was conceptually uncertain, owing to the court's inability to determine with certainty whether someone is of a particular faith, the trust document explicitly set out that a Chief Rabbi could determine it. Lord Denning stating "any conceptual uncertainty" was "cured by the Chief Rabbi clause".

The second device was condemned as ineffective by Jenkins J in Re Coxen, when he wrote:

If the testator had sufficiently defined the state of affairs in which the trustees were to form their opinion he would not have saved the condition from invalidity on the ground of uncertainty merely by making their opinion the criterion.

As such, simply giving the trustees this power was not enough to defeat uncertainties. If, however, the testator "had sufficiently defined" the way in which trustees should exercise their judgement, it would be valid. The final device is to give the trustees the power to give trust property to "anyone in the world" or to "anyone whom the trustees consider appropriate". This has two problems; firstly, the class could be too broad to be administratively workable, and second, the courts are unable to judge if the power has been exercised appropriately. However, in Re Hay's Settlement Trust, Megarry V-C held that, exercised properly, this sort of agreement could be administratively workable, and would not be immediately void. But if the gift were given to a wide class of people for a charitable purpose, it will be valid.

== See also ==
- Certainty in English contract law

== Bibliography ==
- Edwards, Richard; Nigel Stockwell (2007). Trusts and Equity (8th ed.). Pearson Longman. ISBN 978-1-4058-4684-4.
- Hill, James; Troubat, Francis Joseph; Wharton, Henry (1854). A practical treatise on the law relating to trustees: their powers, duties, privileges and liabilities. T. and J. W. Johnson.
- Hudson, Alastair (2009). Equity and Trusts (6th ed.). Routledge-Cavendish. ISBN 0-415-49771-X.
