= Certainty in English law =

Certainty in English law sets out rules for how judges will interpret, sever or put contracts, trusts and other voluntary obligations into effect.

If the terms of the contract are uncertain or incomplete, the parties cannot have reached an agreement in the eyes of the law. An agreement to agree does not constitute a contract, and an inability to agree on key issues, which may include such things as price or safety, may cause the entire contract to fail. However, a court will attempt to give effect to commercial contracts where possible, by construing a reasonable construction of the contract.

Courts may also look to external standards, which are either mentioned explicitly in the contract or implied by common practice in a certain field. In addition, the court may also imply a term; if price is excluded, the court may imply a reasonable price, with the exception of land, and second-hand goods, which are unique.

If there are uncertain or incomplete clauses in the contract, and all options in resolving its true meaning have failed, it may be possible to sever and void just those affected clauses if the contract includes a severability clause. The test of whether a clause is severable is an objective test—whether a reasonable person would see the contract standing even without the clause.

== Contract law ==
While agreement is the basis for all contracts, not all agreements are enforceable. A preliminary question is whether the contract is reasonably certain in its essential terms, such as price, subject matter and the identity of the parties. Generally the courts endeavour to "make the agreement work", so in Hillas & Co Ltd v Arcos Ltd, the House of Lords held that an option to buy softwood of "fair specification" was sufficiently certain to be enforced, when read in the context of previous agreements between the parties. However, the courts do not wish to "make contracts for people", and so in Scammell and Nephew Ltd v Ouston, a clause stipulating the price of buying a new van as "on hire purchase terms" for two years was held unenforceable because there was no objective standard by which the court could know what price was intended or what a reasonable price might be. Similarly, in Baird Textile Holdings Ltd v M&S plc the Court of Appeal held that because the price and quantity to buy would be uncertain, in part, no term could be implied for M&S to give reasonable notice before terminating its purchasing agreement. Controversially, the House of Lords extended this idea by holding an agreement to negotiate towards a future contract in good faith is insufficiently certain to be enforceable.

- Mercantile Credits Ltd v Harry [1969] 2 NSWR 248, failure to specify subject matters
- Sale of Goods Act 1979, s 8(2), 9, certainty of terms
- Brown v Gould [1972] Ch 53
- Sudbrook Trading Estate Ltd v Eggleton [1983] 1 AC 444
- Nicolene Ltd v Simmons [1953] 1QB 543
- May & Butcher v The King [1934] 2 KB 17, agreement to agree
- Foley v Classique Coaches Ltd [1934] 2 KB 1
- Walford v Miles [1992] 2 AC 128, agreement to negotiate
- Pitt v PHH Asset Management Ltd [1994] 1 WLR 327
- Branca v Cobarro [1947] KB 854, agreement “Subject to Contract”
- Masters v Cameron (1954) 91 CLR 353
- Carlton Communications and Granada Media plc v The Football League [2002] EWHC 1650 (Comm)

== Trusts law ==
- Jones v Lock (1865) 1 Ch App 25
- Paul v Constance [1977] 1 WLR 527
- Hunter v Moss [1994] 1 WLR 452
- Re Barlow’s Will Trusts [1979] 1 WLR 278
- McPhail v Doulton [1971] AC 424
- Re Baden’s Deed Trusts (no 2) [1973] Ch 9
- Re Tuck’s Settlement Trusts [1978] Ch 49

== See also ==
- English tort law
- Contra proferentem
- Attorney-General v Barker Bros Ltd [1976] 2 NZLR 495.
