= Discretionary trusts and powers in English law =

Elements of the English law of trusts

Discretionary trusts and powers in English law are elements of the English law of trusts, specifically of express trusts. Express trusts are trusts expressly declared by the settlor; normally this is intended, although there are situations where the settlor's intentions create a trust accidentally. Normal express trusts are described as "fixed" trusts; the trustees are obliged to distribute property, with no discretion, to the fixed number of beneficiaries. Discretionary trusts, however, are where the trustee has discretion over his actions, although he is obliged to act. The advantages of discretionary trusts are that they provide flexibility, and that the beneficiaries hold no claim to the property; as such, they cannot seek to control it, and it cannot be claimed for their debts. A power, or "mere power", on the other hand, is where not only does the holder have discretion over his actions, he has discretion over whether to act in the first place.

== Express trusts ==
Express trusts are those expressly declared by the settlor. Typically, this will be intended to create a trust, but there can be situations in which the settlor's intended actions create a trust accidentally, as in Paul v Constance. The creation of express trusts must involve four elements for the trust to be valid. These are capacity, certainty, constitution and formality. Capacity refers to the donor's ability to create a trust in the first place; generally speaking, anyone capable of holding property can create a trust. There are exceptions for statutory bodies and corporations, and minors who usually cannot hold property can, in some circumstances, create trusts. Certainty refers to the three certainties required for a trust to be valid. These are that the trust instrument must show certainty of intention to create a trust, certainty of what the subject matter of the trust is, and certainty of who the beneficiaries (or objects) are. Where there is uncertainty for whatever reason, the trust will fail, although the courts have developed ways around this. Constitution means that for the trust to be valid, the property must have been transferred from the settlor to the trustees. For chattels, this can simply be handing the property to them, while transfers of land and shares must be done in writing following certain prescribed forms.

If property has not been transferred, the potential trustees and beneficiaries are volunteers, and an equitable maxim is that "equity will not assist a volunteer"; the courts will not look at the case. To get around this, the courts have developed exceptions to this rule for situations when the donor has done "all that he could do", the trustees or beneficiaries have acquired the property in a different way, or where the gift was made donatio mortis causa. Formality refers to the specific language or forms used when transferring property. For chattels, no formal language or documentation is needed, unless it is made as a will. For land, the transfer must be drafted in line with the Law of Property Act 1925 and the Law of Property (Miscellaneous Provisions) Act 1989. When disposing of an equitable interest, the Law of Property Act 1925 must also be followed; much of the case law in this area has centred on the meaning of "dispose", with many cases involving people attempting to avoid tax.

=== Discretionary trusts ===
Normal express trusts are "fixed" trusts; the property is held for a fixed number of beneficiaries, and the trustee is obliged to distribute property without any discretion over who gets what. In a discretionary trust, however, the trustee has discretion over his actions, although he is obliged to use it. Alastair Hudson gives the example of a trust "that [the trustee] shall divide the £1,000 between any of my sons who become unemployed, with the power to retain the whole of that £1,000 for the remainder beneficiary". This is a discretionary trust; the word "shall" means the trustee is forced to exercise his power, while the "power to retain the whole of that £1,000" gives him discretion over whether to retain the money. Discretionary trusts are regularly used, because they provide flexibility; in this situation, for example, the money could be retained and redistributed in a different form if one beneficiary develops some urgent need for it. They also help protect the trust fund. In fixed trusts, the potential beneficiaries have the equitable ownership of their property; in discretionary trusts, this is not the case. Because of this, the property cannot be made liable for their debts or controlled by them.

The creation of a discretionary trust is different from the creation of any other type of express trust, due to the requirement of certainty of objects. This doctrine is that, for an express trust to be valid, the trust document must say with certainty who the beneficiaries there are. This is a problem with discretionary trusts, which can contain a class of beneficiaries rather than a list of named ones. The leading test of certainty of objects here is the "any given postulant test", laid down in Re Gulbenkian. This states that the trustees must be able to say with certainty, when a potential beneficiary comes before them, that he either is or is not a beneficiary. The test was applied to discretionary trusts in McPhail v Doulton. The courts attempted to mitigate this test in Re Baden (No. 2); however, all three judges of the Court of Appeal gave separate new tests and reasons. Stamp LJ had an approach based entirely on the facts, with no greater impact on certainty of objects. Sachs LJ took the approach that the burden of proof was on the claimants to prove they were beneficiaries, not on the trustees to prove the trust was valid Megaw LJ, however, took the approach that a trust could be valid, even with uncertain beneficiaries, if there was a "core number" of beneficiaries who were certain.

=== Powers ===
Where a fixed trust gives the trustee no discretion, and a discretionary trust (a "trust power") gives the trustee discretion and requires him to exercise it, powers go a step further. A "mere power", while not a trust obligation, grants the holder of the power the ability to exercise it, but without any requirement to do so. These powers are normally given to trustees; Hudson gives the example of a situation where the trust instrument states that "the trustee may advance £1,000 to X". The trustee has the power to advance £1,000, but as evidenced by the word "may", is not required to. However, the trustee is bound to consider exercising his powers, and must be able to justify his use. In Re Hay's ST, Megarry VC said that:

A mere power is very different [from an ordinary trust obligation]. Normally the trustee is not bound to exercise it, and the court will not compel him to do so. That, however, does not mean that he can simply fold his hands and ignore it, for normally he must from time to time consider whether or not to exercise the power, and the court may direct him to do this.

The holder of a mere power is therefore free to do what he wants with the property he holds; if he fails to consider his exercise of the power, the courts may force him to do so. In relation to certainty of objects, mere powers are also a problem, for the same reason that discretionary trusts are. The leading test for mere powers is also the "any given postulant" test, which was laid down in Re Gulbenkian. The traditional distinction between trusts and powers has been that "a trust is obligatory, a power discretionary"; the problem is that discretionary trusts, while trusts, contain discretionary elements, to the point where they have been called "powers in the nature of trusts"; a trust which "whilst it masquerades under the guise of a mere power, has more of the characteristics of a trust proper".

== Bibliography ==
- Edwards, Richard; Stockwell, Nigel (2007). Trusts and Equity (8th ed.). Pearson Longman. ISBN 978-1-4058-4684-4.
- Hopkins, John (1968). "Powers in the Nature of a Trust. Powers Collateral. Certainty of Objects". Cambridge Law Journal. 26 (2). Cambridge University Press. ISSN 0008-1973.
- Hudson, Alastair (2009). Equity and Trusts (6th ed.). Routledge-Cavendish. ISBN 0-415-49771-X.
