= Saunders v Vautier =

English trusts law case

- Court: High Court of Chancery
- Full case name: (1) John Saunders and (2) Thomas Saunders v Daniel Wright Vautier
- Decided: 4 June 1841
- Citations: (1841) Cr & Ph 240, (1841) 4 Beav 115; 41 ER 482

Court membership
- Judge sitting: Lord Cottenham LC

Keywords
- Trusts, beneficiaries

Saunders v Vautier [1841] EWHC J82, (1841) 4 Beav 115 is a leading English trusts law case. It laid down the rule of equity which provides that, if all of the beneficiaries in the trust are of adult age and under no disability, the beneficiaries may require the trustee to transfer the legal estate to them and thereby terminate the trust. The rule has been repeatedly affirmed in common law jurisdictions, and is commonly referred to as "the rule in Saunders v Vautier" for shorthand.

== Facts ==
A testator, one Richard Wright, had bequeathed £2,000 worth of stock in the East India Company on trust for his great-nephew, Daniel Wright Vautier, and his wife and heirs. According to the terms of the trust, it was to accumulate until Vautier reached the age of 25. The stock's dividends were to be accumulated along with the capital. Daniel Wright Vautier's father (confusingly, also named Daniel Vautier) died in the testator's lifetime, but after the testator's death, Daniel Vautier's widow, Susannah, commenced a suit for payment out of maintenance to her son during his minority. That order was made on 25 July 1835.

Daniel Wright Vautier then turned twenty-one (the age of majority at the time) in the month of March 1841, and as he was about to be married, he presented a petition for the trustees to be ordered to transfer to him the East India stock, or it be sold and the proceeds transferred to him. His application came before the Master of the Rolls, who on becoming aware of the earlier order dated 25 July 1835 remitted it to the Lord Chancellor for hearing to enable other residuary legatees to present an appeal petition from that order to the Lord Chancellor.

== Judgment ==
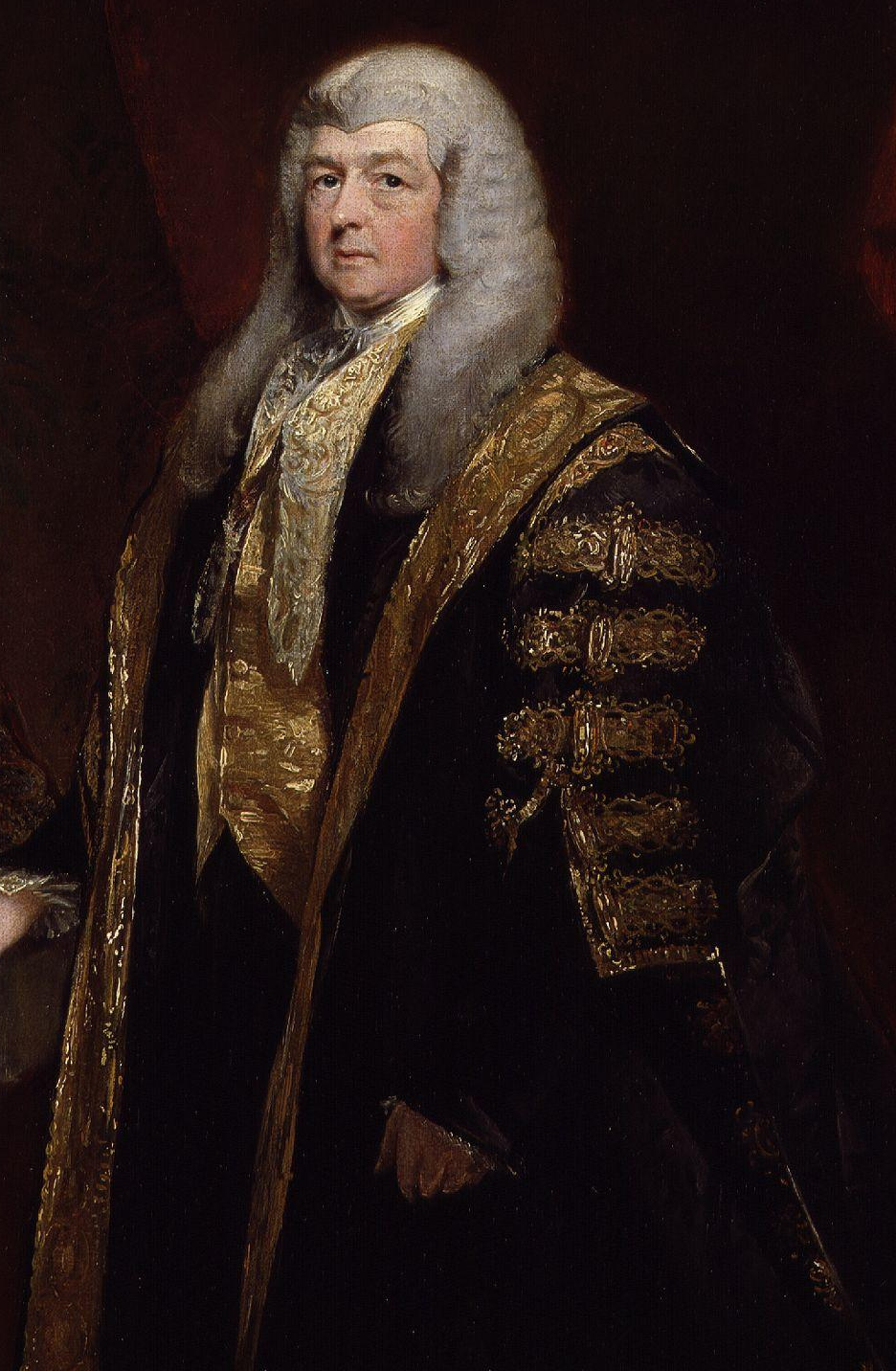
Lord Cottenham LC

The case was ruled in Vautier's favour. The rights of the beneficiary were held to supersede the wishes of the settlor as expressed in the trust instrument.

Lord Cottenham LC held as follows:

I think that principle has been repeatedly acted upon; and where a legacy is directed to accumulate for a certain period, or where the payment is postponed, the legatee, if he has an absolute indefeasible interest in the legacy, is not bound to wait until the expiration of that period, but may require payment the moment he is competent to give a valid discharge.

Although the case is most famous for the principle enunciated above, the court also held that the fact that an earlier maintenance order may have been made erroneously should not have precluded the Master of the Rolls from hearing and determining the case rather than remitting it to the Lord Chancellor. (Note: The case was adjudicated by the Lord Chancellor, Lord Cottenham, after being remitted to him by the then Master of the Rolls, Lord Langdale MR. But the case included an application for variation of an order previously by Cottenham (he was earlier Sir Charles Pepys MR). In the reported judgment of the final appeal he held that "I have no recollection of the case", referring to the earlier hearing.)

== Significance ==
Although the rule is most often exercised where there is a sole trustee holding the trust fund on a bare trust for a sole beneficiary (usually where the trusts were held for the benefit of a tenant for life, who has died, and the sole beneficiary is the remainderman), the rule is not limited to those circumstances. However, if there is more than one beneficiary, then all of them need to be adults and without any disability.

There are a number of reasons why the beneficiaries may elect to do this. In Saunders v Vautier, the accumulation trusts were to continue until the beneficiary was 25, and (at 21) the beneficiary wished to terminate the accumulation. Similarly, if the trusts are held for a tenant for life, and then for the benefit of a remainderman, both tenant for life and remainderman may decide to terminate the trusts and obtain the capital immediately, and agree a partition of the funds between them; this situation often occurs where changes in the revenue laws means that upon the death of the tenant for life the trust fund may be subject to inheritance tax in a way that was not envisaged when the trust fund was originally set up.

It has also been held that the rule in Saunders v Vautier also applies to discretionary trusts as well as fixed trusts. However, some caution is in order, as that decision was made at a time when the law was understood to require that a valid discretionary trust need to be able to draw up a complete list of the beneficiaries of the trust in order to be valid; subsequent to the decision of the House of Lords in McPhail v Doulton [1971] AC 424, this is no longer the appropriate test, (Note: In summary, a discretionary trust is now valid if, of any person it can be said whether they are within the class or not. Clearly such a test would not ordinarily lend itself to termination of the trusts under the rule in Saunders v Vautier, but there seems no reason in principle where a discretionary trust with a specific list of named beneficiaries could not terminate the trust under the rule.) and accordingly it may be that not all discretionary trusts are capable of being terminated by the beneficiaries under the rule.

Where the beneficiaries are all sui juris, and between them absolutely entitled to the trust property, they may require the trustees to end the trusts and distribute the funds as the beneficiaries agree.

== See also ==
- English trusts law
- Claflin doctrine
