= F Goldsmith (Sicklesmere) Ltd v Baxter =

Identification of corporate party in contract dispute

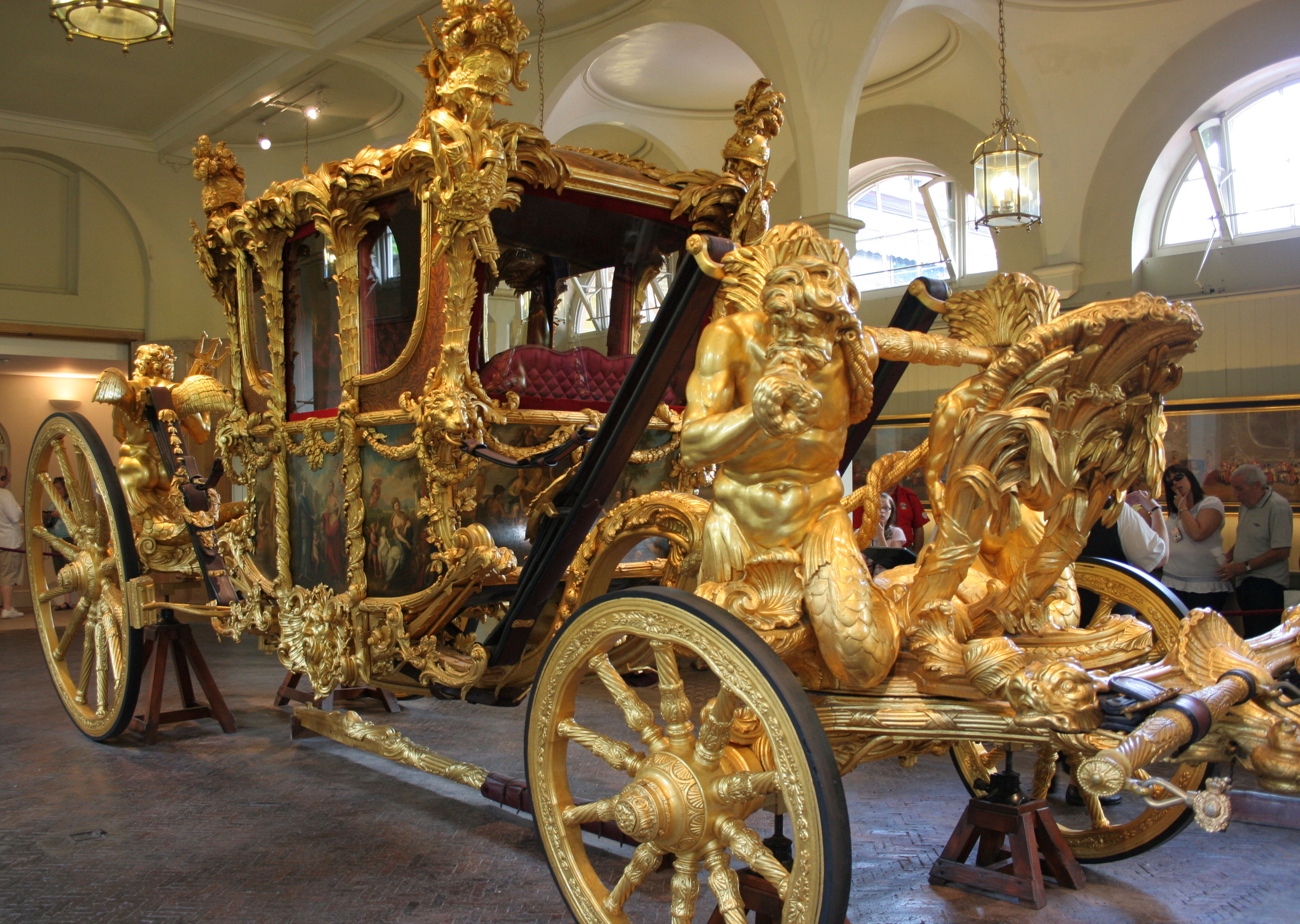
- Court: High Court
- Full case name: F Goldsmith (Sicklesmere) Ltd v Baxter
- Citations: [1970] 1 Ch 85 [1969] 3 WLR 522

Court membership
- Judge sitting: Stamp J

Keywords
- company law; parties to the contract

F Goldsmith (Sicklesmere) Ltd v Baxter [1970] 1 Ch 85 was a judicial decision under United Kingdom company law relating to the proper identification of a corporate party to a contract.

== Facts ==
F Goldsmith (Sicklesmere) Ltd sold a piece of land to the Mr Baxter. The memorandum of agreement gave the name of the plaintiff company, inaccurately, as Goldsmith Coaches (Sicklesmere) Ltd. There was, in fact, no such company by that name. Then Mr Baxter changed his mind and did not wish to complete. The question was whether, although the contract used the wrong name for the company, the agreement could nevertheless be enforced.

== Judgment ==
Stamp J made an order for specific performance against Mr Baxter. Looking at the surrounding circumstances, there could be only one company, which could be clearly identified, which was party to the contract, and reference to it by an inaccurate name did not render the contract void. It was "no more nor less than an inaccurate description" (at 91G) of the company, but it was still entirely clear from the surrounding factual circumstances that it was the company who was the other party to the contract.

== Significance ==
Although F Goldsmith (Sicklesmere) Ltd v Baxter is only a first instance decision, it has become a widely used precedent in situations where the name of a company has been misspelled or otherwise misidentified in a contract or other undertaking. It was most recently cited by the English Court of Appeal with approval in Dumford Trading AG v OAO Atlantrubflot [2005] EWCA Civ 24.

== See also ==
- UK company law
