= Finch Motors Ltd v Quin (No 2) =

1980 High Court of New Zealand case

- Court: High Court of New Zealand
- Full case name: Finch Motors Limited v Quin (No 2)
- Decided: 16 September 1980
- Citation: [1980] 2 NZLR 519

Court membership
- Judge sitting: Hardie Boys J

Keywords
- merchantable quality

Finch Motors Ltd v Quin (No 2) [1980] 2 NZLR 519 is an important case regarding "merchantable quality" under the Sale of Goods Act 1908 and the Consumer Guarantees Act (1993).

== Background ==
Finch Motors ran a car sales yard. In response to a car they advertised for sale, the Quins viewed the car with the view of purchasing it. However, as they planned to use the car for towing a heavy boat, they informed the car yard that they wanted "a V8 motor car for pulling a heavy boat". After a brief inspection, and a short test drive, the Quins purchased the car.

However, three days later, during their first trip with their car towing their boat, it overheated due to a latent defect with the radiator. They also discovered problems with the brakes and the steering, and on top of all this, it also had a blown gasket.

Not satisfied with their recent purchase, they advised the car yard that they were returning the car, which was returned several days later. They cancelled the cheque, and refused the car yard's demands for payment for the car.

The car yard eventually sued the Quins.

== Decision ==
The court ruled that the defect in the radiator was latent, but that the car yard would have been aware of this defect at the time of the sale. The defective radiator made the car unsuitable for what the purchasers wanted to use the car for, namely for towing a boat. That being the case, the sale breached §16(a) of the Sales of Goods Act 1908, and the Quins were entitled to return the car to the dealer.

Footnote: The reason why this case is cited as "No. 2", is that this case is also cited in legal circles regarding the cancelled cheque which is known as case "No. 1".
