= Re Goldcorp Exchange Limited (in receivership): Kensington v Liggett =

Re Goldcorp Exchange Ltd
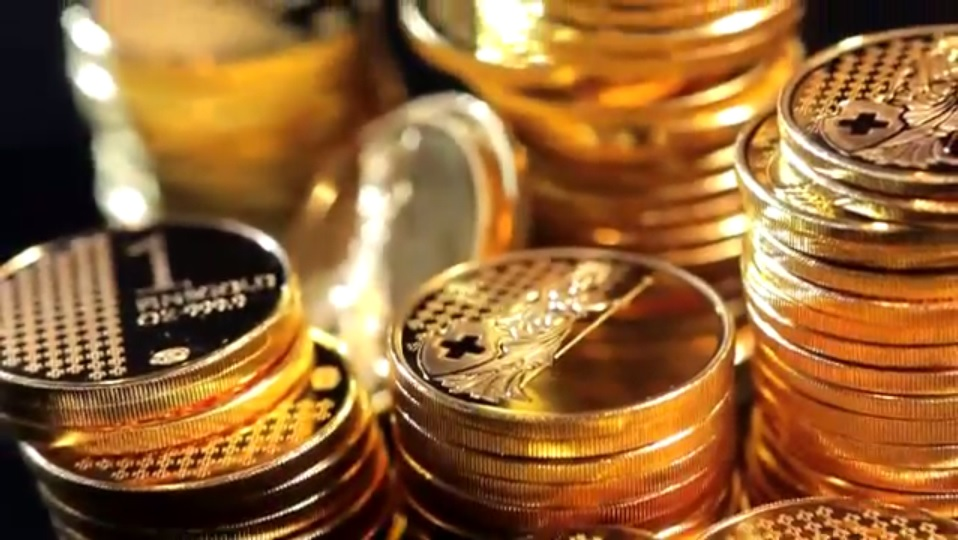
- Court: Judicial Committee of the Privy Council
- Full case name: (1) Bryan Norreys Kensington and John Joseph Cregten (as the receivers of Goldcorp Exchange Limited in receivership) (2) Bank of New Zealand Appellants v(1) The unrepresented non-allocated claimants (2) Steven Paul Liggett and (3) James William Heppleston
- Decided: 25 May 1994
- Citations: [1994] UKPC 3, [1995] 1 AC 74

Case history
- Prior action: , Court of Appeal of New Zealand judgment High Court of New Zealand

Court membership
- Judges sitting: Lord Templeton, Lord Mustill, Lord Lloyd of Berwick, Sir Thomas Eichelbaum

Case opinions
- Lord Mustill

Keywords
- Tracing, certainty

Re Goldcorp Exchange Ltd [1994] UKPC 3 is an English trusts law case by the Judicial Committee of the Privy Council decided on appeal from the Court of Appeal of New Zealand. It considers when there is sufficient certainty of subject matter to form a trust, and tracing. A company dealing in gold and other precious metals became insolvent and the Bank of New Zealand appointed receivers under a debenture. They in turn asked the High Court for guidance on how to treat the company's customers, and Thorp J refused the claims of most of the customers, leaving three categories to be settled on appeal. The outstanding issue was whether the customers had title to the gold on for them, and thus beneficiaries of a trust, or were merely unsecured creditors resulting from a breach of contract.

== Facts ==
Goldcorp Exchange Ltd had a business of holding gold reserves in coins and ingots for customers wishing to invest in gold. Some gold was held for customers, but the levels varied from time to time. The company's employees also told customers that the company would maintain a separate and sufficient stock of each type of bullion to meet their demands, but it did not. The Bank of New Zealand on 11 July 1988, being owed money by Goldcorp Exchange Ltd, petitioned for the business to be wound up. It transpired that Goldcorp had not held anywhere near enough money for the members of the public, around 1000 people, who had supposedly bought gold with it, even though in their contracts they were entitled to delivery of the gold (in 7 days, for a fee) if they wished. The company also lacked enough assets to satisfy the debts to the bank. The members of the public alleged that the gold that remained in stock was entrusted to them. The bank argued that it did not, because the gold stocks had never been isolated; and that all the gold customers were unsecured creditors and that the bank's security interest (a floating charge) took priority. Jonathan Sumption QC represented the bank.

== Advice ==
The Privy Council advised that the customers had no property interest in the gold, and therefore the bank could use it to satisfy its debts. The customers' purchase contracts did not transfer title, because which gold specifically was to be sold was not yet certain. Although Goldcorp's brochures had promised a title, a trust did not arise because there was no declaration of it. There was not enough gold to satisfy the claims, even though it was promised that the gold would be set aside. It was contrary to policy to imply a fiduciary duty simply because there was a breach of contract. It was also rejected that equity required any restitution of the purchase money.

Lord Mustill gave the advice of the Board.

Their Lordships begin with the question whether the customer obtained any form of proprietary interest, legal or equitable, simply by the contract of sale, independently of the collateral promises. In the opinion of their Lordships the answer is so clearly that he did not that it would be possible simply to quote section 18 of the Sale of Goods Act 1908 (New Zealand) (corresponding to section 16 of the Sale of Goods Act 1893 (UK)) and one reported case and turn to more difficult issues. It is however convenient to pause for a moment to consider why the answer must inevitably be negative, because the reasons for this answer are the same as those which stand in the way of the customers at every point of the case. It is common ground that the contracts in question were for the sale of unascertained goods. For present purposes, two species of unascertained goods may be distinguished. First, there are generic goods. These are sold on terms which preserve the seller's freedom to decide for himself how and from what source he will obtain goods answering the contractual description. Secondly, there are "goods sold ex-bulk". By this expression, their Lordships denote goods which are by express stipulation to be supplied from a fixed and a pre-determined source, from within which the seller may make his own choice (unless the contract requires it to be made in some other way) but outside which he may not go. For example, "1 sell you 60 of the 100 sheep now on my farm".

[...]

A more plausible version of the argument posits that the company, having represented to its customers that they had title to bullion held in the vaults, cannot now be heard to say that they did not. At first sight, this argument gains support from a small group of cases, of which Knights v Wiff (1870) LR 5 Q.B. 660 is the most prominent. Wiffen had a large quantity of barley lying in sacks in his granary, close to a railway station. He agreed to sell 80 quarters of this barley to Maris, without appropriating any particular sacks. Maris sold 60 quarters to the Knights, who paid for them and received in exchange a document signed by Maris addressed to the station master, directing him to deliver 60 quarters of barley. This was shown by the station master to Wiffen who told him that when he got the forwarding note the barley would be put on the line. Knights gave a forwarding note to the station master for 60 quarters of barley. Maris became bankrupt, and Wiffen, as an unpaid vendor, refused to part with the barley. Knights sued Wiffen in trover, to which Wiffen pleaded that the barley was not the property of the plaintiff. A very strong court of Queen's Bench found in favour of the plaintiff. Blackburn J. explained the matter thus, at pages 655-666:-

"No doubt the law is that until an appropriation from a bulk is made, so that the vendor has said what portion belongs to him and what portion belongs to the buyer, the goods remain "in solido, and no property passes. But can Wiffen here be permitted to say, 'I never set aside any quarters?' .... The defendant knew that, when he assented to the delivery order, the plaintiff, as a reasonable man would rest satisfied - .. The plaintiff may well say, 'I abstained from active measures in consequence of your statement, and I am entitled to hold you precluded from denying that what you stated was true'."

There may perhaps be a shadow over this decision, notwithstanding the high authority of the court: see the observations of Brett L.J. in Simm v Anglo-American Telegraph Co (1879) 5 QED 188 at page 212. Assuming that the decision was nevertheless correct, the question is whether it applies to the present case. Their Lordships consider that, notwithstanding the apparent similarities, it does not. The agreement for sale in Knight v. Wiffen (supra) was a sale ex-bulk, or at least it must have been seen as such, for otherwise Blackburn J's judgment would have contradicted his treatise in the passage above quoted.

On this view, the bulk was the whole of the stock in Wiffen's warehouse. This stock was therefore committed to the purchase to the extent that Wiffen could not properly have sold the whole of it without making delivery of part to his buyer. Another and more important aspect of the same point is that the bulk existed. The effect of Wiffen's representation was to preclude him from denying to the sub-purchaser, Knights, that he had made a sufficient appropriation from the fixed and identified bulk to give the intermediate purchaser, and hence Knights himself, the proprietary interest sufficient to found a claim in trover. The present case is quite different, for there was no existing bulk and therefore nothing from which a title could be carved out by a deemed appropriation. The reasoning of Knights v Wiffen (supra) does not enable a bulk to be conjured into existence for this purpose simply through the chance that the vendor happens to have some goods answering the description of the res vendita in its trading stock at the time of the sale - quite apart, of course, from the fact that if all the purchasers obtained a deemed title by estoppel there would not be enough bullion to go around.

[...]

Let it be assumed. However, the company could properly be described as a fiduciary and, it can also be assumed that notwithstanding the doubts expressed above the non-allocated claimants would have achieved some kind of proprietary interest if the company had done what it said. This still leaves the problem, to which their Lordships can see no answer, that the company did not do what it said. There never was a separate and sufficient stock of bullion in which a proprietary interest could be created. What the non-allocated claimants are trying to achieve is to attach the proprietary interest, which they maintain should have been created on the non-existent stock, to wholly different assets. It is understandable that the claimants, having been badly let down in a transaction concerning bullion should believe that they must have rights over whatever bullion the company still happens to possess. Whilst sympathizing with this notion their Lordships must reject it, for the remaining stock, having never been separated, is just another asset of the company, like its vehicles and office furniture. If the argument applies to the bullion it must apply to the latter as well, an obviously unsustainable idea.

[...]

For these reasons their Lordships reject, in company with all the judges in New Zealand, the grounds upon which it is said that the customers acquired a proprietary interest in bullion. In the light of the importance understandably attached to this dispute by the courts of New Zealand, and the careful and well-researched arguments addressed on this appeal, the Board has thought it right to approach the question afresh in some little detail. The question is not, however, novel since it has been discussed in two English authorities very close to the point.

The first is the Judgment of Oliver J. (as he then was) in In re London Wine Co (Shippers) Ltd [1986] PCC 121. The facts of that case were not precisely the same as the present, and the arguments on the present appeal have been more far-reaching than were there deployed. Nevertheless, their Lordships are greatly fortified in their opinion by the close analysis of the authorities and the principles by Oliver J., and in other circumstances, their Lordships would have been content to do little more than summarise it and express their entire agreement. So also with the judgment delivered by Scott L.J. in Mac-Jordan Construction Ltd v Brookmount Erostin Ltd [1992] BCLC 350 which is mentioned by Gault J. [1993] 1 N.Z.L.R. 257. 284, but not discussed since it was not then reported in full. This was a stronger case than the present, because the separate fund which the contract required the insolvent company to maintain would have been impressed with a trust in favour of the other party, if it had been maintained and also because the floating: charge which, as the Court of Appeal held, took priority over the contractual claim, expressly referred to the contract under which the claim arose. Once again their Lordships are fortified in their conclusion by the fact that the reasoning of Scott L.J. conforms entirely with the opinion at which they have independently arrived.

Lord Templeman, Lord Lloyd and Sir Thomas Eichelbaum agreed.

== Significance ==
The outcome of the advice of the Board was not mirrored by the Supreme Court in In re Lehman Brothers International (Europe), which concerned consumers who were held to have had a trust of assets under the Markets in Financial Instruments Directive that was designed to protect their savings.

== See also ==
- English trusts law
- UK commercial law
