= Re Harvard Securities Ltd =

- Court: High Court
- Full case name: IAN DAVID HOLLAND Applicant and (1) LESLEY ROV NEWBURY (2) RONALD HOWARD FREDERICK SHARWOOD Respondents
- Citations: [1997] EWHC Comm 371, [1997] 2 BCLC 369

Keywords
- Trusts

Re Harvard Securities Ltd [1997] EWHC 371 (Comm) is an English trusts law case, concerning the certainty of subject matter in a trust.

== Facts ==
The liquidator of Harvard Securities Ltd, a stockbroking company, applied under the Insolvency Act 1986 section 112 to determine whether the company or its clients held a beneficial interest in shares of which the company held possession. Harvard Securities business was buying blocks of Australian or US shares, which it sold onto clients in parcels. It retained legal title of the shares, as a nominee for each client. But the parcels were not registered individually in the names of the clients. The company then went insolvent. It was also necessary to determine the applicable law. If the clients had a beneficial interest in the shares, it meant that they would not be available for the liquidator.

== Judgment ==
Neuberger J held that English law applied to the US shares (Australian law to the Australian shares, up to those sold after the 14 July), and the clients did have a beneficial interest, as there was no need to segregate the property. In principle, it was a valid declaration of trust to say that a percentage of shares would be held on trust, as in the Court of Appeal's decision in Hunter v Moss. But here, unidentified shares in a class were being treated as beneficial property. If the correspondence had specified the number of shares, there would have been a beneficial interest. Therefore, the clients did have an interest in the US shares. The liquidator was at liberty to sell the shares and account to the former clients out of the net proceeds of sale, pro rata, to their respective interests. Australian law was different for the shares acquired before 14 July 1986. In the course of his judgment Neuberger J. said the following.

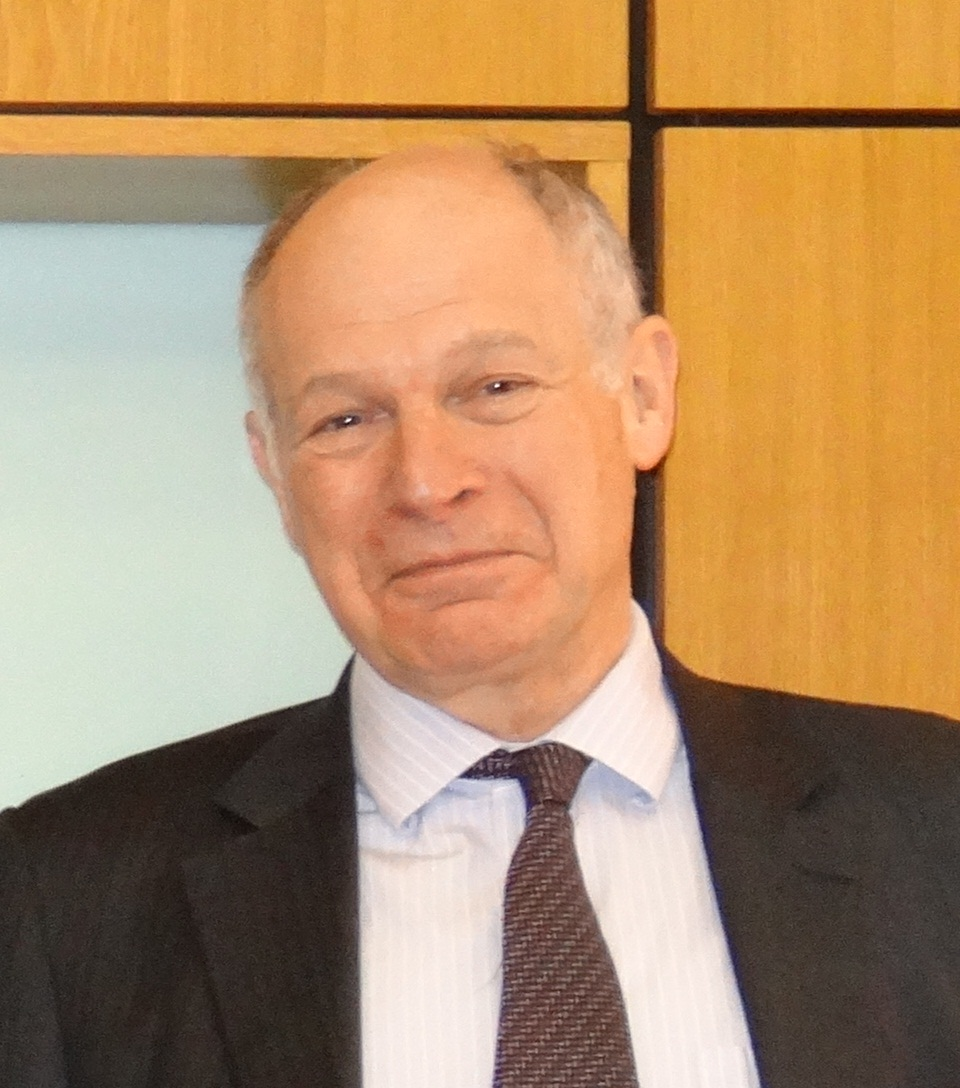
Neuberger J.

55. While I am not particularly convinced by the distinction, it appears to me that a more satisfactory way of distinguishing Hunter from the other cases is that it was concerned with shares, and not with chattels.’ This is consistent with Re Rose, the basis identified (and said) unsatisfactory by Underhill and Hayton, and Atkin LJ said the words, 630, ‘ordinary operations of buying and selling goods’. Also there is a need to appropriate chattels before interests can transfer, but not so with equitable assignments of a debt or a fund.

56. Fourthly, as the editors of Meagher Gummow & Lehane on Equity Doctrines & Remedies (Third Edition) point out, the need for appropriation before any equitable interest can exist in relation to chattels can be contrasted with the absence of any such need before there can be an effective equitable assignment of an unascertained part of a whole debt or fund (see at paragraphs 679 to 682). This distinction is described by the editors as "very difficult to see"; nonetheless, they accept that, despite the criticism to which cases such as Wait have been subjected, it is unlikely that they will be overruled. The editors conclude:

"What must be appreciated, despite what has sometimes been said in reliance on the judgment of Atkin LJ..., is the narrow scope of the principle for which those cases stand: it applies only to contracts for the sale of an unascertained part of a mass of goods. So limited, the principle may still be regarded as anomalous but, perhaps, commercially convenient: see Re Wait at 636, 639, 640 per Atkin LJ."

57. The description of the sub-contracted grain in Wait, the client's wine in London Wine, and the customer's bullion in Goldcorp as "an unascertained part of a mass of goods" is quite apt. It would not, however, be a sensible description of the 50 shares in Hunter or, indeed, the shares in the present case. Mr Halpern pointed out that it is not really possible to identify, whether physically or by words, a proportion of a debt, whereas it is possible to identify chattels (by labelling or segregation) or shares (by reference to their number); he also pointed out that part of a debt or fund is fungible with the balance. For those two reasons, he submitted that the inconsistency suggested in Meagher Gummow & Lehane is not valid. There is obvious force in that point, but, in the end, it seems to me that, given that the distinction exists between an assignment of part of a holding of chattels and an assignment of part of a debt or fund, the effect of the decision in Hunter is that, in this context, shares fall to be treated in this context in the same way as a debt or fund rather than chattels.

58. In all the circumstances, therefore, it seems to me that the correct way for me, at first instance, to explain the difference between the result in Hunter, and that in Wait, London Wine and Goldcorp, is on the ground that Hunter was concerned with shares, as opposed to chattels.

59. To my mind, the provisions of cl. 5 and the correspondence and other documentation to which I have referred show that, as between Harvard and its former clients, a particular number of unidentified shares of a particular class in a particular company were being treated as the beneficial property of the client. Had the correspondence and internal records of Harvard gone one stage further, and identified the share numbers the subject of this arrangement, Mr Halpern accepts (quite rightly in my judgment) that the beneficial interest in the relevant shares would have been vested in the client. The only reason for contending that this is not the case is that the precise shares were not identified. In light of the decision and reasoning in Hunter, and the above discussion, I do not consider that it is open to me to hold that that aspect prevents Harvard’s former clients having a beneficial interest in the shares, so far as English law is concerned.

== See also ==
- English trust law
