= Consumer Guarantees Act 1993 =

Act of Parliament in New Zealand

Consumer Guarantees Act
- Royal assent: 20 August 1993
- Commenced: 1 April 1994
- Status: Current legislation

The Consumer Guarantees Act (CGA) 1993 is a consumer protection law that was enacted in New Zealand in 1993. Consumer protections were previously in the Sale of Goods Act 1908.

== Differences over the Sales of Goods Act ==
One of the CGA's biggest changes was that it extended protection to consumers for the supply of services. Another change was that the CGA explicitly outlawed a merchant from contracting out of the CGA, such as having a "no refunds" or "no returns" displayed.

== Guarantees for goods ==
The CGA gives guarantees to free title, quality, fitness for purpose and price of consumer goods. The goods must also comply with description and with sample. If a good is faulty, the Act gives the retailer a reasonable time to either fix or replace the goods, otherwise the consumer has the right to reject the goods, cancel the contract, and obtain a full refund from the retailer. The legislation has now been amended to include online purchases from traders, including auction websites such as TradeMe and Shopless.

The CGA gives guarantees of reasonable care and skill, of fitness for purpose, of completion, and of price for consumer services supplied.

The CGA does not apply to either commercial goods, or consumer good or services supplied for business purposes.

== Cases ==
- Finch Motors Ltd v Quin (No 2)
- Jetz International Ltd v Orams Marine Ltd
- Price v Sports Marine Ltd
