= Price v Sports Marine Ltd =

- Court: District Court of New Zealand
- Full case name: Price v Sports Marine Ltd
- Decided: 24 May 1996

Court membership
- Judge sitting: Hubble J

Price v Sports Marine Ltd is a cited case in New Zealand regarding liability exclusion clauses which are generally prohibited for non business transactions under section 43 of the Consumer Guarantees Act 1993.

== Background ==
The Price's owned a 17 ft Searay boat, which they placed with Sports Marine to sell on their behalf. The Price's agreed to a non liability clause with Sports Marine.

Whilst the boat was at Sports Marine, one of their staff damaged the boat during the test run, damage which Sports Marine argued that the non liability clause stopped them for being liable. The Prices argued that the CGA makes such clauses unenforceable regarding consumer transactions.

== Held ==
The clause was a breach of section 32(c) of the CGA.
