= Nubar Gulbenkian =

Armenian businessman

- Born: Nubar Sarkis Gulbenkian; 2 June 1896; Kadıköy, Ottoman Empire
- Died: 10 January 1972 (aged 75); Cannes, France
- Education: Harrow School; Trinity College, Cambridge
- Occupation: Businessman
- Spouses: Herminia Rodríguez-Borrell (m. 1922); Dora Freeland (m. 1928); Marie Berthe Edmée de Ayala (m. 1944)
- Parent: Calouste Gulbenkian

Nubar Sarkis Gulbenkian (Armenian: Նուպար Սարգիս Կիւլպէնկեան; 2 June 1896 – 10 January 1972) was an Armenian-British business magnate and socialite born in the Ottoman empire. During World War II, he helped organize the underground network that would become known as the Pat O'Leary Line to repatriate British airmen who became stranded in France.

== Early years ==
The son of Calouste Gulbenkian, he was born in Kadıköy, Ottoman Empire, but his family fled from the country when he was a few weeks old due to the Hamidian massacres of Armenians. Taken by his father to England, he was educated at Harrow School, Trinity College, Cambridge and in Germany. He was admitted as a student to the Middle Temple in London on 18 October 1917, but he was not called to the bar. As a consequence of his educational background, Gulbenkian saw himself as British and strove to live up to the model of the English gentleman.

Gulbenkian was living in what became Vichy France when Nazi Germany invaded and occupied France in summer 1940. From July to October, he was an agent for the British intelligence agency MI9. Working with Ian Garrow, he laid the groundwork for the creation of a network of people to guide stranded allied soldiers over the Pyrenees mountains to non-belligerent Spain, from where they could be repatriated to the United Kingdom. As the war went on most of the escapees became airmen shot down over occupied Europe. Following Garrow's arrest, the urban network was led by Albert-Marie Guérisse, and became known by his nom de guerre, the Pat O'Leary Line. Later, Gulbenkian was attached to the Iranian Embassy in London in an honorary role (as he held Iranian citizenship). This helped him during the war as his neutral passport allowed him to cross between France and Spain with little trouble and thus gain access to British intelligence in Gibraltar.

== Business ==
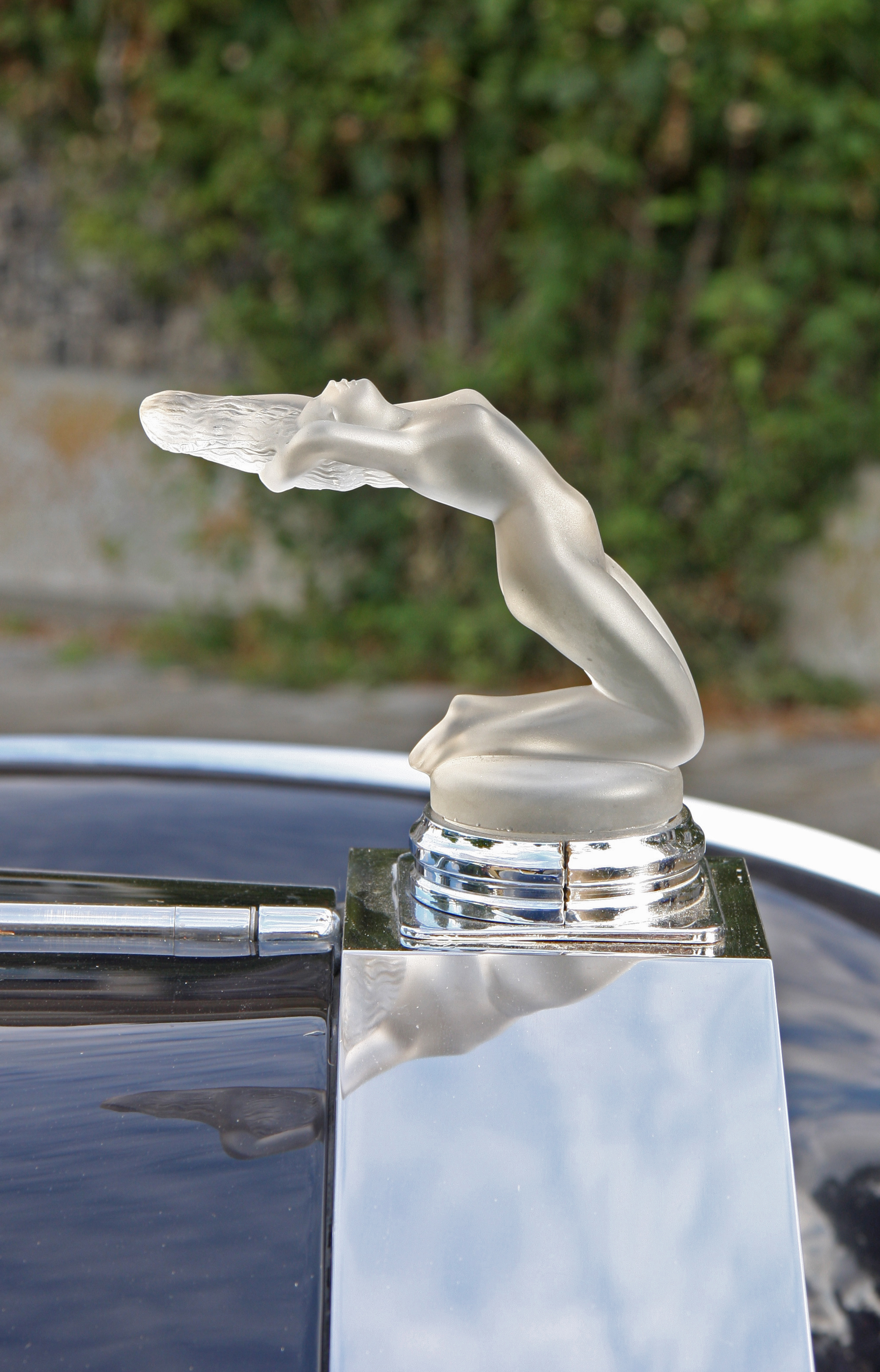
Chrysis, designed by René Lalique, Gulbenkian's Rolls-Royce

Gulbenkian began as an unpaid worker for his father, who was as noted for his miserly tendencies as his son would be for his spending, but later sued his father for $10 million, bizarrely after a refusal by the company to allow him $4.50 for a lunch of chicken in tarragon jelly. Ultimately the incident contributed to Calouste Gulbenkian's decision to leave $420 million of his fortune to the Calouste Gulbenkian Foundation in Portugal.

Although he ultimately inherited $2.5 million from his father, as well as more in a settlement from the Foundation, Gulbenkian also became independently wealthy through his own oil dealings. He was initially the protégé of Henri Deterding at Royal Dutch Shell but later made an independent fortune which allowed him to live a highly extravagant lifestyle.

== Eccentricity ==
Gulbenkian's long beard, monocle and the orchid in his buttonhole which was replaced daily led to him becoming noted for a fairly eccentric life, with a number of stories building up around his name. An associate claimed that "Nubar is so tough that every day he tires out three stockbrokers, three horses and three women". He was a regular on the international playboy scene.

An aficionado of the London taxi, he frequently stated that "It turns on a sixpence, whatever that is!" He had two Austin FX4 cabs converted to his own specifications, with the passenger compartment re-modelled as the rear part of a horse-drawn Hackney carriage, and despite their somewhat bizarre appearance, one of the vehicles sold for £23,000 in 1993.

He was an early guest of John Freeman on the BBC series Face to Face in 1959, but refused to sign a contract or accept a fee for his appearance. During the interview he attacked the Trustees of the Gulbenkian Foundation in what bordered on slander. Following his appearance, he sued the Corporation to be given a copy of the episode, which he claimed had been promised in lieu of a fee, although the suit was not successful.

A well-known gourmet, he was quoted as saying that "the best number for a dinner party is two – myself and a damn good head waiter." Other stories attached to his name include stating his "position in life" on a market research form as "enviable".

== Personal life ==
He was married three times, "I've had good wives, as wives go, and as wives go, two of them went". In 1922, he married Galician socialite Herminia Elena Josefa Rodríguez-Borrell Feijóo (1897-1971). In 1928, he married Dora Freeland (aka Doré Plowden) (1893-1981) in London. He courted Marie Berthe Edmée de Ayala, daughter of the French champagne tycoon Louis d'Ayala, for 14 years before they married in 1948. He had no children.

He lived at Arlington House, a block of flats close to London's Ritz Hotel, and at a former rectory in Hoggeston, near Bletchley, Buckinghamshire.

He died on 10 January 1972 at the English Hospital in Cannes, France, and had lived nearby at his "sumptuous estate" the Domaine des Colles at Valbonne.

== Will ==
Controversy continued to follow him after his death due to the vague nature of his father's will, which appeared to suggest that everybody Nubar was employed by or stayed with during his life should receive some money (See Re Gulbenkian's Settlements [1970] AC 553). The case was eventually taken to the House of Lords before settlement.
