= Garden House riot =

1970 riot in Cambridge, England

The Garden House riot was a civil disturbance at the Garden House Hotel in Cambridge on Friday 13 February 1970. It was the only serious disturbance at the University of Cambridge in the period around the widespread 1968 student protests. The event has been described as a marking a watershed in student protest in the UK.

== Background ==
The Greek Tourist Board organised a "Greek Week" in Cambridge in 1970, with support from the Greek government and local travel agents, including events at the Royal Cambridge Hotel and its sister hotel, the Garden House. Protesters against the Greek junta, the 'Colonels' regime', gathered outside the hotels for several days, culminating with a crowd of several hundred protesters – mostly Cambridge University students organised by socialist groups – demonstrating against a Greek dinner for 120 guests being held in the River Suite at the Garden House Hotel from 7:30 pm on 13 February.

== Events ==
The protesters picketed the venue – in a narrow cul-de-sac off Mill Lane, beside the River Cam – to discourage diners from entering. The noisy crowd attempted to disrupt speeches inside, with a loudspeaker in a Fellow's room in neighbouring Peterhouse playing music by dissident Greek composer Mikis Theodorakis. Protesters invaded the hotel's garden, still icy from recent snow, banging on the windows of the venue and climbing onto the hotel roof. An attempt to break up the crowd using a fire hose played from a first floor window at the hotel failed, and violence broke out: the hotel was invaded and damaged (estimated at £2,276), one policeman was seriously injured, others received minor injuries, and a University pro-proctor, zoologist Dr Charles Burford Goodhart, was struck by a half-brick and taken to hospital. Around 80 policemen accompanied by police dogs restored order by about 11 pm.

Six students were arrested on 13 February, and the university proctors provided the police with the names of approximately 60 people they had spotted in the crowd. Fifteen students were tried on a variety of charges at the Hertford Assizes in June and July 1970, including riotous assembly, unlawful assembly, assaulting a police constable, and possessing offensive weapons. Charges against another four people – including economist Bob Rowthorn, the only senior member of the university to be charged – had been dismissed at a committal hearing in May.

== Aftermath ==
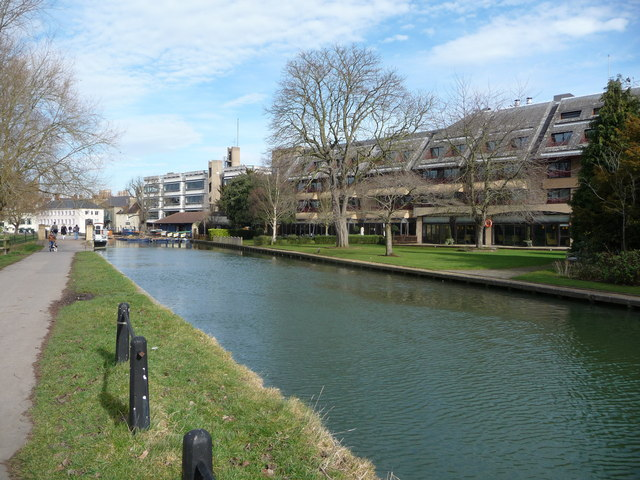
Cambridge DoubleTree, formerly the Garden House Hotel, in 2009

After a trial of seven days, the jury took nearly four hours to reach its decision. Seven of the defendants were acquitted, but eight students were convicted, including the six arrested in February and two others seen pushing in the crowd. All were aged between 19 and 25. Judge Melford Stevenson controversially gave harsh sentences to those involved. Six of the convicted students were sentenced to between 9 months and 18 months in prison, and two aged under 21 were sentenced to periods in borstal. One student from Brazil and a second from South Africa were also recommended for deportation. The sentences were criticised as heavy-handed, as was the judge's comment that he would have passed heavier sentences but for the "evil influence of some senior members of the university". The Vice-Chancellor of Cambridge University, Owen Chadwick, contradicted press statements that students were incited to violence by more senior members of the university.

All eight made appeals to the Court of Appeal against their sentences, and three against their convictions. The appeals were heard by Lord Justice Eric Sachs, Mr Justice Maurice Lyell and Ralph Cusack on 18 August. Only one appeal – the South African student, found with a mole fuse (a small smoke bomb for smoking out moles) in his pocket, and convicted for possessing an offensive weapon – was allowed, but the recommendation for deportation of the Brazilian student was also cancelled. The case remains a precedent for the legal principles that holding strong political views is no excuse for violent acts, that prosecuting only a few out of a number of potential defendants is permitted, that a defendant's individual acts should not be considered in isolation but must take their share of blame from the broader context of the disorder, and that encouraging or promoting disorder by words or actions is as culpable as participating in it. The case also continues to be cited in deportation cases, for the principle that a decision to recommend deportation following a conviction must be justified by the potential detriment to the UK if the person is allowed to stay. The president of the National Union of Students, Jack Straw (who was Home Secretary from 1997 to 2001), accused the court of discriminating against students.

Several of the defendants returned to their degrees after serving their sentences; others had already completed their studies. The incident led to a reform of the powers of the Cambridge University proctors.

The Garden House Hotel was destroyed by a fire on 23 April 1972 in which two guests died. It was rebuilt the following year. Later the hotel became the DoubleTree by Hilton, Cambridge, then, at the start of 2020, the Cambridge Hotel. In 2021, it became Graduate Cambridge, after a complete interior renovation; the refurbished 148-room hotel has a restaurant called Garden House.
