= Attorney-General v Barker Bros Ltd =

- Court: Court of Appeal of New Zealand
- Full case name: Attorney-General v Barker Bros Ltd
- Decided: 17 June 1976
- Citation: [1976] 2 NZLR 495

Court membership
- Judges sitting: Richmond P, Woodhouse J, Cooke J

Keywords
- contract formation, certainty

Attorney-General v Barker Bros Ltd [1976] 2 NZLR 495 is a cited New Zealand case regarding the legal concept of certainty regarding contract formation. It reinforces in NZ case law the English case of G Scammell & Nephew Ltd v Ouston [1941] AC 251.

== Background ==
The crown leased an airstrip in Te Hapupu, Chatham Islands from Barker Bros for a term of 5 years, with the lease giving the crown a right of renewal. Clause 2 stated "The terms and conditions of any such renewal renewed lease shall be as agreed upon the parties at the time, but the [renewed] rent shall not be less than the amount payable hereunder". Unfortunately, the lease gave no explicit method to calculate the new rent if the lease was later renewed.

However, clause 18, was an arbitration clause which said "In the case of any difference or dispute arising as to any clause, matter or thing herein contained or implied, or by arising in any way in respect of this deed such difference or dispute shall be decided by ... [arbitration]".

When the crown later tried to renew the lease, Barker Bros tried to substantially increase the rent from $6,750 per year, to $13,000, which the crown found was excessive and refused to pay. Barker Bros, then argued the lease had now ended, whilst the crown argued the dispute should be referred to arbitration, as per clause 18 of the lease agreement.

As a result, the crown sought a declaration from the court to have the matter referred to arbitration, which Barker Bros defended (successfully) that the lease renewal clause lacked certainty i.e. a mechanism to set the new rent, making it an incomplete contract and thus legally unenforceable.

The crown appealed.

== Held ==
The Court of Appeal ruled that the contract could be renewed, as the new rental could be set via arbitration, as per the lease's arbitration clause. Barker's previous declaration was set aside.
