= Re Tuck's Settlement Trusts =

English trusts law case

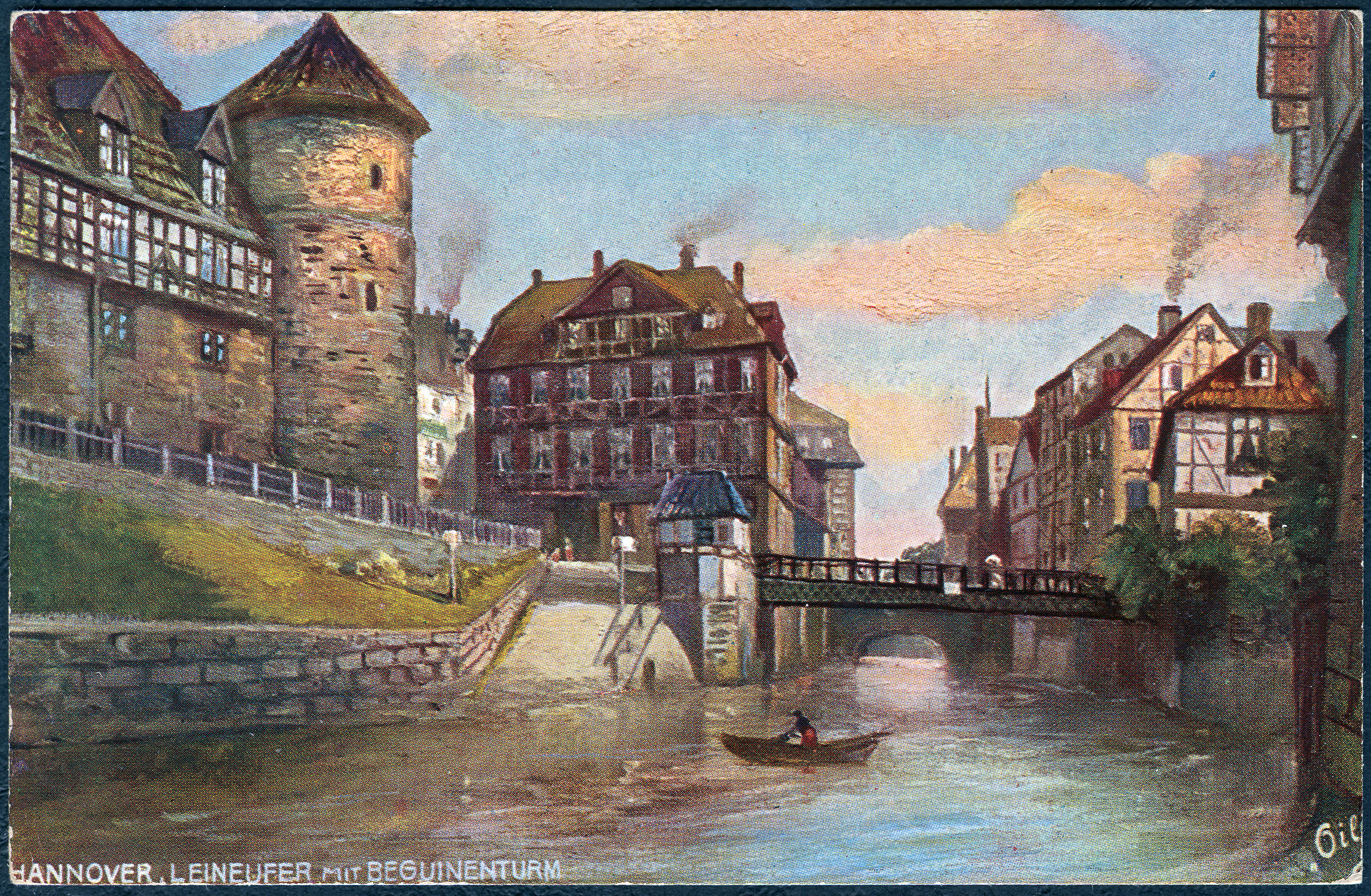
- A Tuck picture of Hannover
- Court: Court of Appeal
- Citations: [1977] EWCA Civ 11, [1978] Ch 49

Keywords
- Certainty, express trusts

Re Tuck's Settlement Trusts [1977] EWCA Civ 11 is a leading English trusts law case, concerning the certainty of trusts.

== Facts ==
Sir Adolph Tuck, a baronet who had run the art publisher Raphael Tuck & Sons, created a trust for future baronets who were married to a wife 'of Jewish blood' and who 'continues to worship according to the Jewish faith'. If in doubt, 'the decision of the Chief Rabbi in London of either the Portuguese or Anglo German Community… shall be conclusive'. It was contended that the concepts of being of Jewish faith and of Jewish blood were too uncertain for the trust to be valid.

== Judgment ==
Lord Denning MR held the trust was valid, and the Chief Rabbi could resolve any uncertainty. The trust, however, would have been valid even if the Chief Rabbi had not been identified.

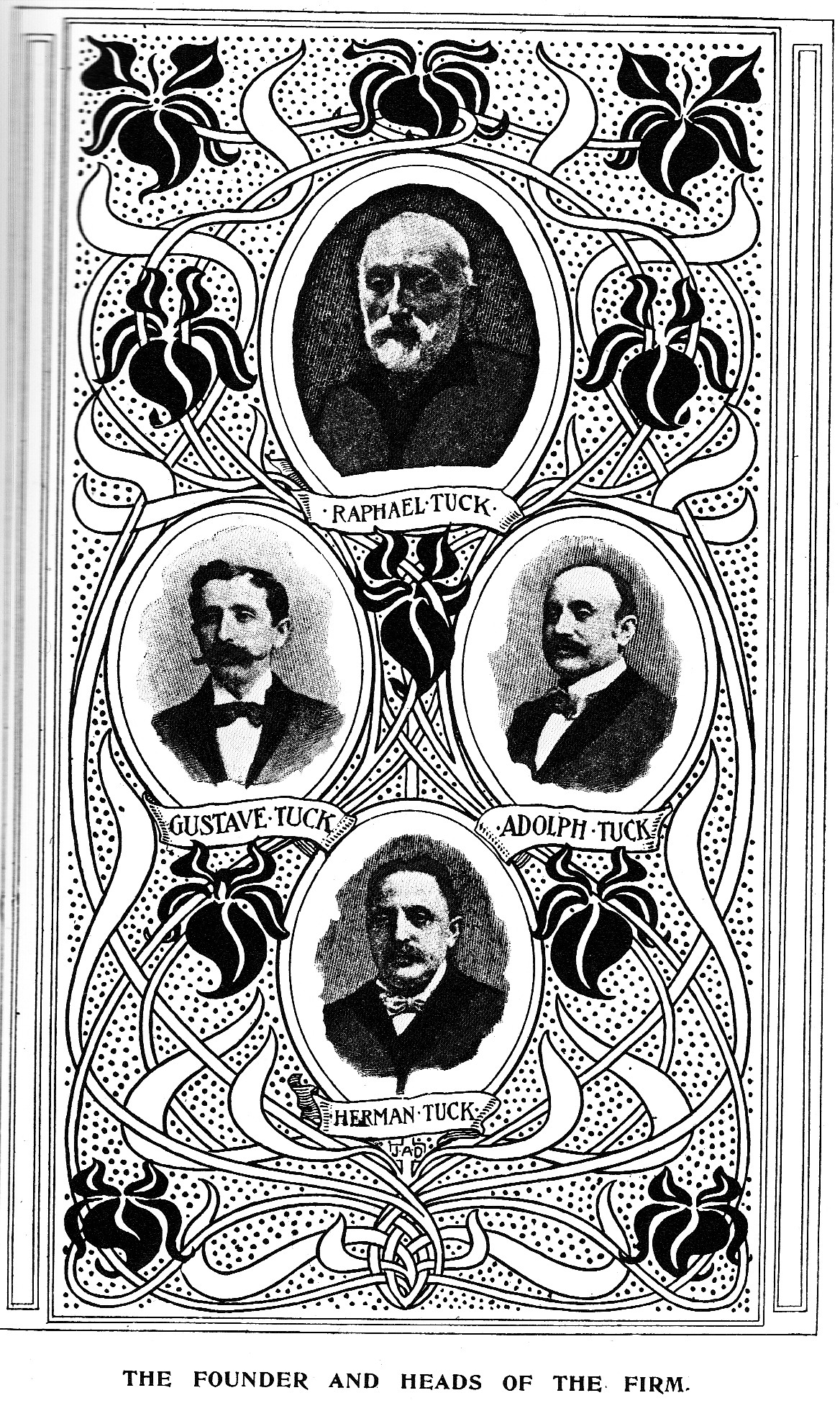
Sir Adolph Tuck's family.

Sir Adolph himself died on 3 July 1926, leaving two sons and three daughters. He was succeeded by his eldest son, Sir William Tuck. He married an approved wife and had a son and daughter. Sir William died on 12 May 1954, and was succeeded by his son, Sir Bruce Tuck. Sir Bruce married first an approved wife and had two sons. But in 1964 there was a divorce. In 1968 he married a lady who was not an approved wife.

Now a question arises whether the settlement is valid or not. If it is valid, the fund will go to Sir Bruce Tuck and his two sons. If it is invalid, it will go to Sir Adolph's estate.

Mr. Dillon, QC submitted that the definition of 'approved wife' was so uncertain as to be void for uncertainty: that this uncertainty could not be cured by referring the matter to the Chief Rabbi: and that in consequence all the provisions in the settlement referring to an 'approved wife' must be disregarded.

If this argument is correct, it means that the intentions of the settlor, Sir Adolph, have been completely defeated by the ingenuity of the lawyers: first, in discovering the uncertainty: and, secondly, in refusing to allow it to be cured by reference to the Chief Rabbi. I will deal with these two points in order.

[...]

In making his submissions, Mr. Dillon, Q. C. used two phrases which have begun to fascinate Chancery lawyers. They are "conceptual uncertainty" and "evidential uncertainty". After a little probing, I began to understand a little about them. "Conceptual uncertainty" arises where a testator or settlor makes a bequest or gift upon a condition in which he has not expressed himself clearly enough. He has used words which are too vague and indistinct for a court to apply. They are not sufficiently precise. So the court discards the condition as meaningless. It makes it of no effect, at any rate when it is a condition subsequent.

"Evidential uncertainty" arises where the testator or settlor, in making the condition, has expressed himself clearly enough. The words are sufficiently precise. But the court has difficulty in applying them in any given situation because of the uncertainty of the facts. It has to resort to extrinsic evidence to discover the facts, for instance to ascertain those whom the testator or settlor intended to benefit and those whom he did not. Evidential uncertainty never renders the condition meaningless. The Court never discards it on that account. It applies the condition as best it can on the evidence available.

This dichotomy between "conceptual" and "evidential" uncertainty was adumbrated by Jenkins J. in Re Coxen (1948) Chancery at pages 761/2. It is implicit in Lord Upjohn's speech in Re Gulbenkian [1970] A.C. 508 at page 525 and accepted by Lord Wilberforce in Re Baden's Deed Trusts [1971] A.C. 424 page 457. I must confess that I find the dichotomy most unfortunate. It has led the courts to discordant decisions. I will give some relevant instances. On the one hand, a condition that a person shall "not be of Jewish parentage" has been held by the House of Lords to be void for conceptual uncertainty, at any rate in a condition subsequent, see Clayton v Ramsden [1943] A.C. 320 : and a condition that a person shall be "of the Jewish race" was held by Mr. Justice Dankwerts to be void for conceptual uncertainty, even in a condition precedent, see Re Tarnpolsk [1958] 1 WLR 1157 . The reason in each case being that the testator had given no information or clue as to what percentage or proportion of Jewish blood would satisfy the requirement. Is it to be 100 per cent, or will 75 per cent or 50 per cent be sufficient? The words do not enable any definite answer to be given.

[...]

I deplore both these dichotomies, for a simple reason and a good reason. They serve in every case to defeat the intention of the testator or settlor. The courts say: "We are not going to give effect to his intentions - because he has not expressed himself with sufficient distinctness or clearness". That assertion gives rise to argument without end as to whether his words were sufficiently clear and distinct: and whether the condition in which they occur was a condition precedent or a condition subsequent.

Lord Russell of Killowen agreed with Lord Denning MR, concluding with the following.

The second matter is the effect of the reference to a decision of the Chief Rabbi mentioned to solve problems that may arise: it was argued by the Respondents that this solved any question of uncertainty: for the Appellants it was argued that if the concept was uncertain this could not be a solution: if it was too uncertain for the court it was too uncertain for the Rabbis, who could not make a trust for the Settlor, or could not oust the jurisdiction of the court to decide. I do not propose to rule upon this. No problem may arise in the spheres allotted to the Rabbis: None has arisen yet. The learned Judge indicated that he would have found the condition too uncertain but for the reference to the Rabbis. I do not so find it.

Eveleigh LJ said the trust was valid, but only because the Chief Rabbi’s opinion of who was Jewish was part of the definition of the class of beneficiaries. He felt he would not have been able to resolve an uncertain class.

== See also ==
- English trusts law
