= Jetz International Ltd v Orams Marine Ltd =

New Zealand case on Consumer Guarantees Act, 1999

- Court: Court of Appeal of New Zealand
- Full case name: Jetz International Ltd v Orams Marine Ltd
- Citation: [1999] DCR 831

Court membership
- Judge sitting: Caldenhead J

Jetz International Ltd v Orams Marine Ltd [1999] DCR 831 is a cited case in New Zealand confirming that the consumer protections under the Consumer Guarantees Act cover consumer goods owned even if they are owned by a limited liability company, as long as they are used for consumer purposes.

== Background ==
Jetz was a holding company for the ownership of a launch, and rented a berth at a dry stack marina run by Orams Marine.

Problems arose when a former employee broke into the marina, used the gantry crane to retrieve the launch, and took it for a joyride, during which the launch suffered considerable damage.

Afterwards, Orams refused to reimburse Jetz for the damage, relying on liability exclusion clause in clause 21 of the rental agreement.

Jetz sued for the damage under the Consumer Guarantees Act as, if covered by the Act, such exclusion clauses are not valid.

== Held ==
The Court ruled that the launch was consumer goods, for consumer purposes, meaning that the exclusion clause was not legally valid, and awarded damages of $18,000.
