= Re Baden's Deed Trusts (No 2) =

Re Baden’s Deed Trusts (No 2)
- Court: Court of Appeal
- Citations: [1972] EWCA Civ 10, [1973] Ch 9

Court membership
- Judges sitting: Stamp LJ; Sachs LJ; Megaw LJ

Case opinions
- Stamp LJ, Sachs LJ and Megaw LJ

Keywords
- Certainty, express trusts

Re Baden’s Deed Trusts (No 2) [1972] EWCA Civ 10 is an English trusts law case, concerning the circumstances under which a trust will be held to be uncertain. It followed on from McPhail v Doulton, where the House of Lords affirmed that upholding the settlor's intentions was of paramount importance. It dealt with the same facts as McPhail v Doulton, since the Lords had remanded the case to the Court of Appeal to be decided using the legal principles set out in McPhail.

== Facts ==
Mr Bertram Baden settled a trust for the employees, relatives and dependants of his company, Matthew Hall & Co Ltd. It said the net income of the trust fund should be applied by the trustees ‘in their absolute discretion’ and as they thought fit for the employees, relatives and dependants in grants. The House of Lords in McPhail v Doulton held that the trust would in principle be valid if it could be said with certainty that a hypothetical claimant "is or is not" within the class of beneficiaries. The case returned to the lower courts to determine if the trust was in fact enforceable.

Brightman J held the House of Lords decision had overruled previous IRC v Broadway Cottages so that the rule in Re Gulbenkian applied equally to trusts as to powers: a trust was valid if it could be said with certainty that any given individual was or was not a member of a class of beneficiaries, and accordingly the clause was valid as a trust. The executors appealed.

== Judgment ==
The Court of Appeal held, dismissing the appeal, that to apply the Re Gulbenkian test for a discretionary trust, "conceptual" and "evidential" were distinct. If a claimant could not bring evidence he was a beneficiary, he would not be. But there was no inherent conceptual uncertainty in the words "dependants" or "relatives", and the clause was valid.

The three judges gave different views on why the trust was valid. Stamp LJ held that the trust was valid because the court could always determine who was a dependant and a relative could be restricted to a workable definition of the next of kin.

Sachs LJ held the test required only clarity in the concept. He put it as follows.

The court is never defeated by evidential uncertainty... Once the class of persons to be benefited is conceptually certain it then becomes a question of fact to be determined on evidence whether any postulant has on inquiry been proved to be within it: if it is not so proved, then he is not in it.

Megaw LJ viewed the position to be as follows.

the test is satisfied if, as regards at least a substantial number of objects, it can be said with certainty that they fall within the trust; even though, as regards a substantial number of other persons, if they ever for some fanciful reason fell to be considered, the answer would have to be, not ‘they are outside the trust’, but ‘it is not proven whether they are in or out’.

He said that requiring complete conceptual certainty would amount to a return to the list certainty test.

== See also ==
- English trusts law
