= Donaghy's Rope & Twine Co Ltd v. Wright Stephenson & Co =

Donaghy's Rope & Twine Co Ltd v Wright Stephenson & Co
- Court: Court of Appeal of New Zealand
- Full case name: Donaghy's Rope & Twine Co Ltd v Wright Stephenson & Co
- Citation: (1906) 2 NZLR 641

Court membership
- Judge sitting: Justice Theophilus Cooper

Donaghy's Rope & Twine Co Ltd v. Wright Stephenson & Co (1906) 2 NZLR 641 is a cited case in New Zealand regarding the risk of goods under the Sale of Goods Act 1908.
