= Re London Wine Co (Shippers) Ltd =

Re London Wine Shippers Ltd
- Court: High Court
- Citation: [1986] PCC 121

Keywords
- Trusts

Re London Wine Shippers [1986] PCC 121 is an English trusts law case, concerning the necessity of ascertaining assets subject to a trust. It has been distinguished by Hunter v Moss, and Re Harvard Securities Ltd, and may not be consistent with the general policy of insolvency law as seen in Re Lehman Brothers International (Europe).

== Facts ==
Unsecured creditors of a bankrupt wine trading company, London Wine Shippers Ltd, argued that they should be able to claim the bottles of wine they had paid for. The fine wine company had gone into receivership, and the remaining wine stock was a valuable asset. The bottles that the customers had bought had not yet been individually identified. The company had not even promised to provide wine from its current stocks.

== Judgment ==
Oliver J held that even if the company had said the wine was to come from current stocks, the trust would in any event have been uncertain. There could be no award for specific performance because the Sale of Goods Act required similarly that any goods be ascertained. In the course of his judgment, Oliver J said as follows.

I appreciate the point taken that the subject matter is a part of a homogeneous mass so that specific identity is of as little as importance as it is, for instance, in the case of money. Nevertheless, as it seems to me, to create a trust it must be possible to ascertain with certainty not only what the interest of the beneficiary is to be but to what property it is to attach. I cannot see how, for instance, a farmers who declares himself to be a trustee of two sheep (without identifying them) can be said to have created a perfect and complete trust… And it would seem to me to be immaterial that at the time he has a flock of sheep out of which he could satisfy the interest.

Any alleged constructive or express trust of 50 bottles because the subject matter of the trust would be uncertain, at least until 50 specific bottles were set aside for the customers.

== See also ==
- English trust law
