= Re Lehman Brothers International (Europe) =

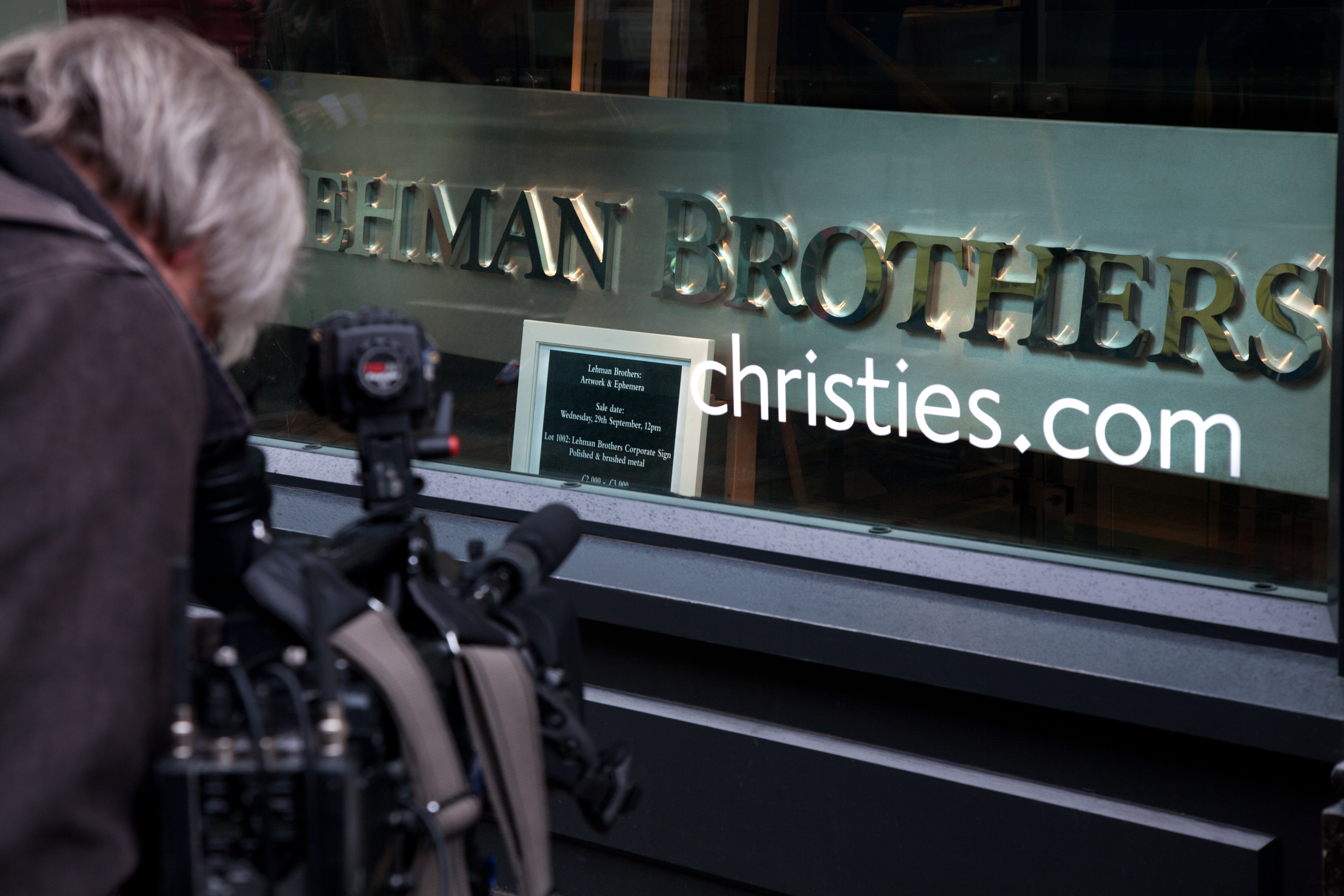
- Court: Supreme Court
- Full case name: In the matter of Lehman Brothers International (Europe) (In Administration) and In the matter of the Insolvency Act 1986
- Decided: 29 February 2012
- Citation: [2012] UKSC 6

Keywords
- Trusts, certainty, financial services

Re Lehman Brothers International (Europe) [2012] UKSC 6 is an English trusts law and UK insolvency law case, concerning the certainty of subject matter to create a trust.

== Facts ==
Lehman Brothers International (Europe) was the UK subsidiary of Lehman Brothers Holdings Inc, the US parent that had gone in Chapter 11 bankruptcy proceedings. It had held money on behalf of many clients, including some affiliates of Lehman. The client money rules of Financial Services Authority were in the Client Assets Sourcebook, chapter 7, issued under the FSMA 2000 section 138. FSMA 2000 section 139 permitted FSA rulemaking for ‘clients’ money being held on trust in accordance with the rules’, and accordingly CASS 7.7.2R said that client money was to be held on trust for the purpose of the client money rules. If a firm failed, the client money distribution rules in CASS 7.9 applied. But under CASS 7.4, a firm could either (1) pay money into a segregated account or (2) put the money into the firm's own house accounts and then segregate it into client accounts at the close of the preceding day's business. Lehman had done the alternative approach in (2). On 15 September 2008, Lehman went into administration, a ‘primary pooling event’ under CASS 7, so the funds in each ‘client money account’ were to be treated as pooled and then distributed so that each client received a sum rateable to their ‘client money entitlement’. The administrators asked the High Court for directions under the Insolvency Act 1986 Schedule B1, about how to apply CASS 7 to the client money that Lehman held. There was a lot of unsegregated client money in the firm's house accounts because of the operation of the alternative approach, and also significant non-compliance of Lehman with CASS 7 over a long time.

== Judgment ==
=== High Court ===
Briggs J held the statutory trust imposed on the client's funds under CASS 7 arose as soon as a firm received them. This was to achieve better protection as required by the Markets in Financial Instruments Directive 2004/39/EC, article 13(7) and the Implementing Directive 2006/73/EC art 16. The term ‘client money account’, for what money needed to be pooled under CASS 7.9.6R referred to segregated accounts of a client, not any other account of the firm, so it excluded identifiable client money in house accounts. The pool was to be distributed only among clients whose funds had been placed in segregated accounts.

=== Court of Appeal ===
Lord Neuberger MR, Arden LJ and Sir Mark Waller dismissed Lehman Brothers Holding Inc's appeal on the timing of the statutory trust, but allowed the appeal of a representative of Lehman's non-segregated clients and two affiliates. It held the pool comprised all identifiable client money the firm's hands, and all were entitled to participate in the pool. A representative of the secured clients appealed.

Arden LJ said the following.

171. As I indicated under Analytical Framework above, trust law can in general be moulded by the terms of the trust, and of course it is open to Parliament to enact any provision that it thinks fit (though this proposition may have to be modified in relation to European Union law). However, because of the impact on unsecured creditors, the court has in my judgment to start from the position that a trust is not intended to be created by a statutory rule if the trust is not one which could be created under the general law. In my judgment, a trust cannot be created without property to which it can attach. Where there is no property which is sufficiently identified to form the subject matter of a trust, no trust is created. In Hunter v Moss, the shareholding was in existence; the shares were fungible and thus the trust property could be identified. The same would be true if LBIE had an account called “manufactured dividends” into which it paid whatever was found to be due at each reconciliation on account of such dividends, and held for the benefit of clients entitled to manufactured dividends. But it does not suffice under the general law that LBIE had sufficient funds in some other account which could have been dedicated for this purpose but which was not so used. Turning to CASS7, there is no indication in CASS7.2.1R that the definition of “client money” is intended to create a trust in circumstances where the relationship under the general law could never be anything more than that of debtor and creditor. On the contrary, in my judgment, the choice of the word “holds” in CASS7 supports the conclusion that CASS7.2.1R requires that money should (if not received for the client) have been set aside for the client, and means more than simply "becomes indebted".

Lord Neuberger MR concurred, saying the following.

216. Turning from textual factors to policy and commercial considerations, it seems to me that it is unlikely that client money which had yet to be segregated under the alternative approach was intended to be treated differently from client money which had been segregated either under the normal approach or under the alternative approach. It seems to me that it is unlikely that the FSA would have intended a client who made a payment to a firm which adopted the alternative approach should, albeit for a couple of days at most, be at risk in a way in which a client who made a similar payment to a firm which adopted the normal approach would not be. After all, as Arden LJ said in argument, a client would have no knowledge which approach a particular firm was adopting. Similarly, it seems unlikely that the FSA intended that there should be two categories of client when it came to the clients of a firm which adopted the alternative approach. That approach was simply introduced to give large firms a degree of administrative flexibility and it seems somewhat unlikely that it was intended to affect clients' substantive rights. 217. Against this, there is some initial attraction in the notion that the wider meaning would render the clients with money in the segregated accounts worse off, and it cannot have been intended that they should be prejudiced in this way. On analysis, it seems to me that this attack on the wider meaning fails, and may well rebound. The thrust of CASS7.7.2R and CASS7.9.6R is that, at least on a primary pooling event, the clients of a firm are "in it together", and client money is pooled and paid out to all clients on a pro rata basis. So it should not be surprising if the pooling extends to client money in house accounts. In any event, unless the firm infringes CASS7, there should be no great disadvantage: client money should only be in house accounts for two working days at most, and, even then, it should be protected and should not be used for the firm's business (if my provisional view on the first issue is correct).

=== Supreme Court ===
Lord Clarke, Lord Dyson and Lord Collins held that, dismissing the appeal, CASS 7 was to be construed according to the purpose of the MiFiD 2004/39/EC and 2006/73/EC, to achieve a high level of protection for client money, with the prompt and scrupulous segregation of funds. The statutory trust created by CASS 7.7.2R arose on receipt of the client money, and the fiduciary duties imposed by CASS 7 were owed by LBIE in respect of all client money, not just balances standing to credit in client accounts. The decision that fiduciary duties were owed by a firm in respect of all client money was relevant to construe CASS 7. If there was a choice of interpretations, then the one chosen should be the highest level of protection. Although CASS 7 used trust concepts, it was not meant to limit trust law. CASS 7.9.6R(2) referred to a client's contractual entitlement when it said ‘client money entitlement’ to have money segregated. Lord Clarke said the following.

110. ... the questions raised by this appeal depend, not upon the ordinary law of trusts, but on the true construction of the relevant provisions of CASS 7. Lord Dyson has described with clarity the factual background against which CASS 7 must be construed. The most important features of that background are MiFiD and the Implementing Directive, the purposes of which include providing a high level of protection for all clients who provide moneys for investment on their behalf. As I see it, one of the principal purposes of CASS 7 is to provide protection as between clients on the one hand and the firm on the other. Clients as a whole have a higher level of protection if all clients who have provided money and who have a claim against the company are entitled to claim against the pool than if such claims are limited to those with a proprietary right. I do not see anything odd or inappropriate in such a conclusion. On the contrary, it seems to me to be consistent with the principles underlying MiFiD and the Implementing Directive.

[...]

121. I agree with Lord Neuberger at para 226 that, as he put it, it could be dangerous to look at the general law of trusts because CASS 7 is intended to be a code.

Lord Dyson gave the leading judgment.

131. It is not in issue that CASS 7 was made for the purpose of fulfilling the EU requirements contained in the Markets in Financial Instruments Directive 2004/39/EC ("MiFID") and the Commission Directive 2006/73/EC ("the Implementing Directive") and that CASS 7 should therefore be interpreted, as far as possible, so as to give effect to these Directives: see, for example, HM Revenue and Customs Comrs v IDT Card Services Ireland Ltd [2006] STC 1252. As Arden LJ explained at paras 59 to 62 of her judgment, this requires a two-stage test to be applied. The first involves interpreting the Directives. The second involves interpreting CASS 7 in the light of the meaning of the Directives. At para 57 of his judgment, Briggs J correctly stated that domestic legislation which is made for the purposes of fulfilling the requirements of EU law contained in a Directive must be interpreted in accordance with the following principles: (i) it is not constrained by conventional rules of construction; (ii) it does not require ambiguity in the legislative language; (iii) it is not an exercise in semantics or linguistics; (iv) it permits departure from the strict and literal application of the words which the legislature has elected to use; (v) it permits the implication of words necessary to comply with Community law; and (vi) the precise form of the words to be implied does not matter.

132. The purposes of MiFID and the Implementing Directive include providing a high level of protection for clients and safeguarding their rights to funds in the event of the insolvency of the firm to which their funds have been entrusted. The recitals to MiFID include recital (2) which states "it is necessary to provide for the degree of harmonisation needed to offer investors a high level of protection" (emphasis added); recital (17) which states that persons who provide the investment services and/or perform their investment activities covered by this Directive should be subject to authorisation by the home member states "in order to protect investors and the stability of the financial system"; and recital (26) which provides: "in order to protect an investor's ownership and other similar rights in respect of securities and his rights in respect of funds entrusted to a firm, those rights should in particular be kept distinct from those of the firm". The aim of protecting investors is also expressed in recitals (31), (44), (61) and (71). Article 13(7) of MiFID requires an investment firm to make "adequate arrangements" in relation to financial instruments belonging to clients to "safeguard clients' ownership rights, especially in the event of the investment firm's insolvency". Article 13(8) requires an investment firm, when holding funds belonging to clients, to make adequate arrangements to safeguard the clients' rights and… prevent the use of client funds for its own account".

[...]

141. Lord Walker says (at para 78) that the biggest objection to the claims basis of interpreting 7.9.6R is that it involves on the assumed facts of this case "a cataclysmic shift of beneficial interest on the PPE, to the detriment of those clients who must have supposed that their funds were safely segregated in accordance with CASS 7.1 to 7.8". It would amount to the segregated clients' funds being used as "a strange form of compensation fund for disappointed clients whose funds had not been segregated".

142. It is true that, on the assumed facts of this case, the claims basis can be said to involve a cataclysmic shift of beneficial ownership on the PPE. But that is because, on the assumed facts, there was a spectacular failure to comply with the CASS 7 rules for a very long period. But I have already counselled against allowing the exceptional nature of the assumed facts to compel a particular conclusion to the issues of construction that arise in this case.

143. More importantly, CASS 7.7.2R provides that the trust is for the purposes and on the terms of the client money rules and the distribution rules. Thus 7.7.2R itself points to the beneficiaries under the distribution rules as being all the clients for whom the firm has received and is holding client money. In other words, such interest under the trust as any clients have is expressly on the terms of the distribution rules, of which 7.9.6R is the principal operative provision.

144. Lord Walker says that the notion that clients must be taken to have implicitly accepted the risk of discovering, on a PPE, that their carefully-segregated funds must be shared with non-segregated clients (including LBIE's own affiliates) seems "quite unrealistic" (para 79). I respectfully disagree. The general scheme of CASS 7 is that all client money is subject to a trust that arises upon receipt of the money by the firm. This includes money received from the firm's affiliated companies.

Lord Collins gave a concurring judgment.

Lord Hope gave the initial opinion, but dissented, saying the following.

2. Under English law the mere segregation of money into separate bank accounts is not sufficient to establish a proprietary interest in those funds in anyone other than the account holder. A declaration of trust over the balances standing to the credit of the segregated accounts is needed to protect those funds in the event of the firm’s insolvency. Segregation on its own is not enough to provide that protection. Nor is a declaration of trust, in a case where the client’s money has been so mixed in with the firm’s money that it cannot be traced. So segregation is a necessary part of the system. When both elements are present they work together to give the complete protection against the risk of the firm's insolvency that the client requires.

Lord Walker dissented.

== See also ==
- English trust law
