= Re Gulbenkian's Settlements Trusts =

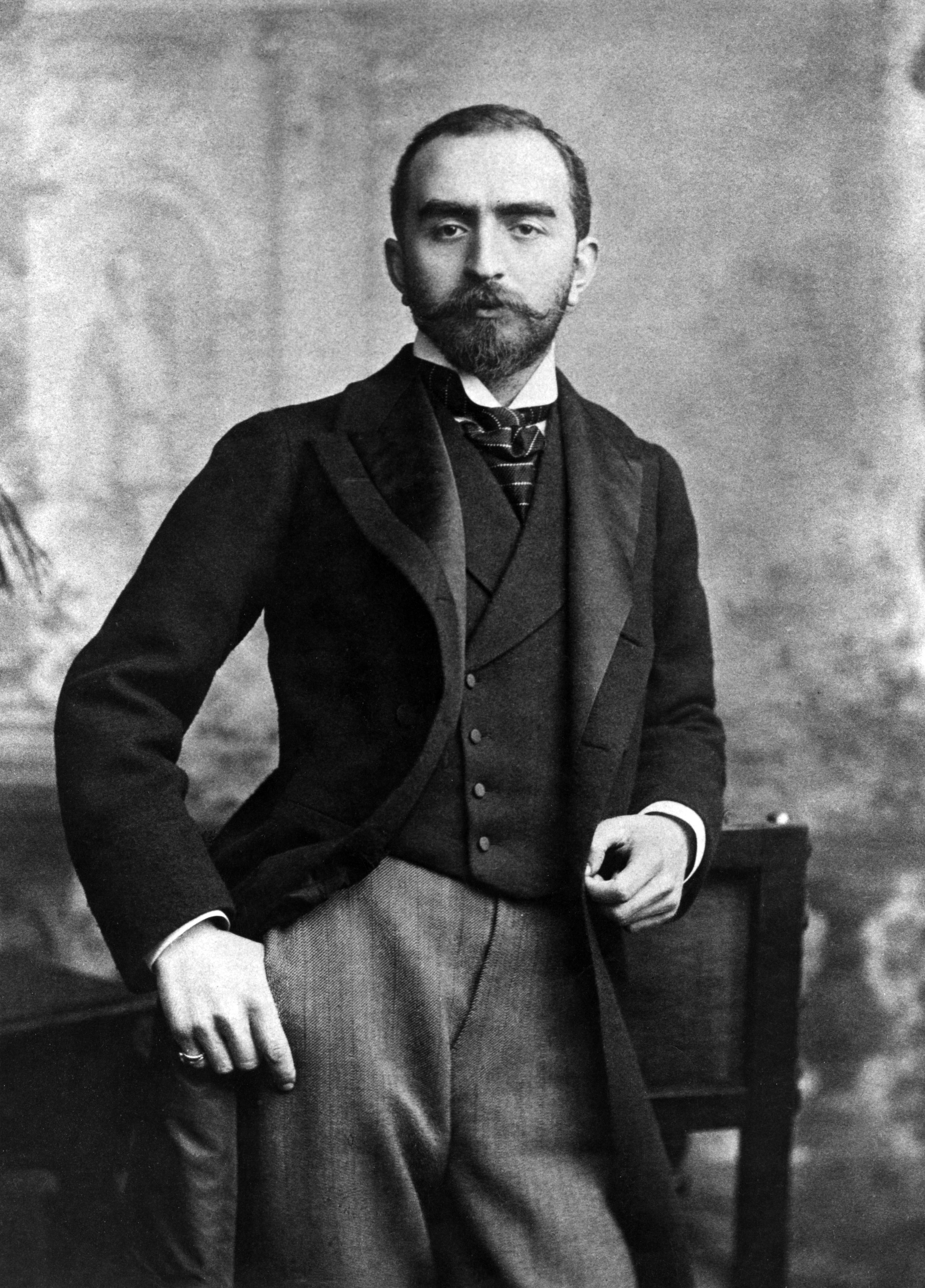
- Calouste Gulbenkian
- Court: House of Lords
- Citation: [1968] UKHL 5, [1970] AC 508

Keywords
- Certainty, express trusts

Re Gulbenkian’s Settlements Trusts [1968] is an English trusts law case, concerning the certainty of trusts. It held that while the 'is or is not' test was suitable for mere powers, the complete list test remained the appropriate test for discretionary trusts. It was only a year later in McPhail v Doulton that the 'is or is not' test was considered appropriate for discretionary trusts by a different panel of their lordships.

== Facts ==
Calouste Gulbenkian, a wealthy Armenian oil businessman and co-founder of the Iraq Petroleum Company, made a settlement in 1929 that said the trustees should ‘in their absolute discretion’ and while his son Nubar Gulbenkian was still alive, give trust property to 'Nubar Sarkis Gulbenkian and any wife and his children or remoter issue for the time being in existence whether minors or adults and any person or persons in whose house or apartments or in whose company or under whose care or control or by or with whom the said Nubar Sarkis Gulbenkian may from time to time be employed or residing'. It was argued this was too uncertain to be enforced.

== Judgment ==
At first instance, Goff J declared the settlement invalid, following Re Gresham's Settlement where Harman J held a similar clause invalid.

=== Court of Appeal ===
The Court of Appeal held that the trust should be declared valid, so long as any claimant could be said to fall within the class at hand. Lord Denning MR said the action was a challenge to Gresham’s case, and continued.

In all these cases if there is some particular person at hand, of whom you can say that he is fairly and squarely within the class intended to be benefited, then the clause is good. You should not hold it to be bad simply because you can envisage borderline cases in which it would be difficult to say whether or not a person was within the class. I have always thought that a condition should be held good so long as it can be given an intelligible and ascertainable content. It is not to be held bad for uncertainty, unless that uncertainty is such as to make the clause meaningless, see Fawcett Properties Ltd v Buckingham County Council [1961] AC 636, 678. So far from this clause being meaningless, I think it is quite meaningful. At any rate it can be applied in practice without the slightest difficulty. The trustees have done so. They have been applying it in favour of Mr. Nubar Gulbenkian. If a question arose in the future as to whether a person was "residing" with him or in his company or whether he was "employed" by a person, I should have thought that in nearly every case there would be no difficulty in answering it. It is only by imagining borderline cases that it can be suggested that it is uncertain. I do not think that ought to be done. I am quite satisfied that this clause is valid and good.

Danckwerts LJ and Winn LJ agreed that the decision should be overturned and held the trust valid.

=== House of Lords ===
The House of Lords held for powers of appointment, objects were sufficiently certain if any given individual could be said to be in, or not in, the class. (So this was more relaxed than list certainty, which requires everyone to be said to be in the class.) Lord Upjohn reaffirmed the list certainty test for discretionary trusts, but then in McPhail v Doulton, the list certainty test was abandoned for discretionary trusts as well.

It is… the duty of the court by the exercise of its judicial knowledge and experience in the relevant matter, innate common sense and desire to make sense of the settlor’s or parties’ expressed intentions, however obscure and ambiguous the language that may have been used, to give a reasonable meaning to that language if it can do so without doing complete violence to it. The fact that the court has to see whether the clause is ‘certain’ for a particular purpose does not disentitle the court from doing otherwise than, in the first place, try to make sense of it.

Lord Reid said, 'It is often difficult in a particular case to determine whether a temporary sojourn amounts to "residence".' But he held that it was certain enough to succeed.

== See also ==
- English trusts law
