= Sale of Goods Act 1908 =

Act of Parliament in New Zealand

Sale of Goods Act

New Zealand Parliament
- Royal assent: 4 August 1908

Repealed by
- Contract and Commercial Law Act 2017
- Status: Repealed

The Sale of Goods Act 1908 was an Act of Parliament passed in New Zealand that was repealed by the Contract and Commercial Law Act 2017.

The coverage of consumer goods is now covered by the Consumer Guarantees Act 1993.

== Cases ==
- Donaghy's Rope & Twine Co Ltd v Wright Stephenson & Co
