= Paul v Constance =

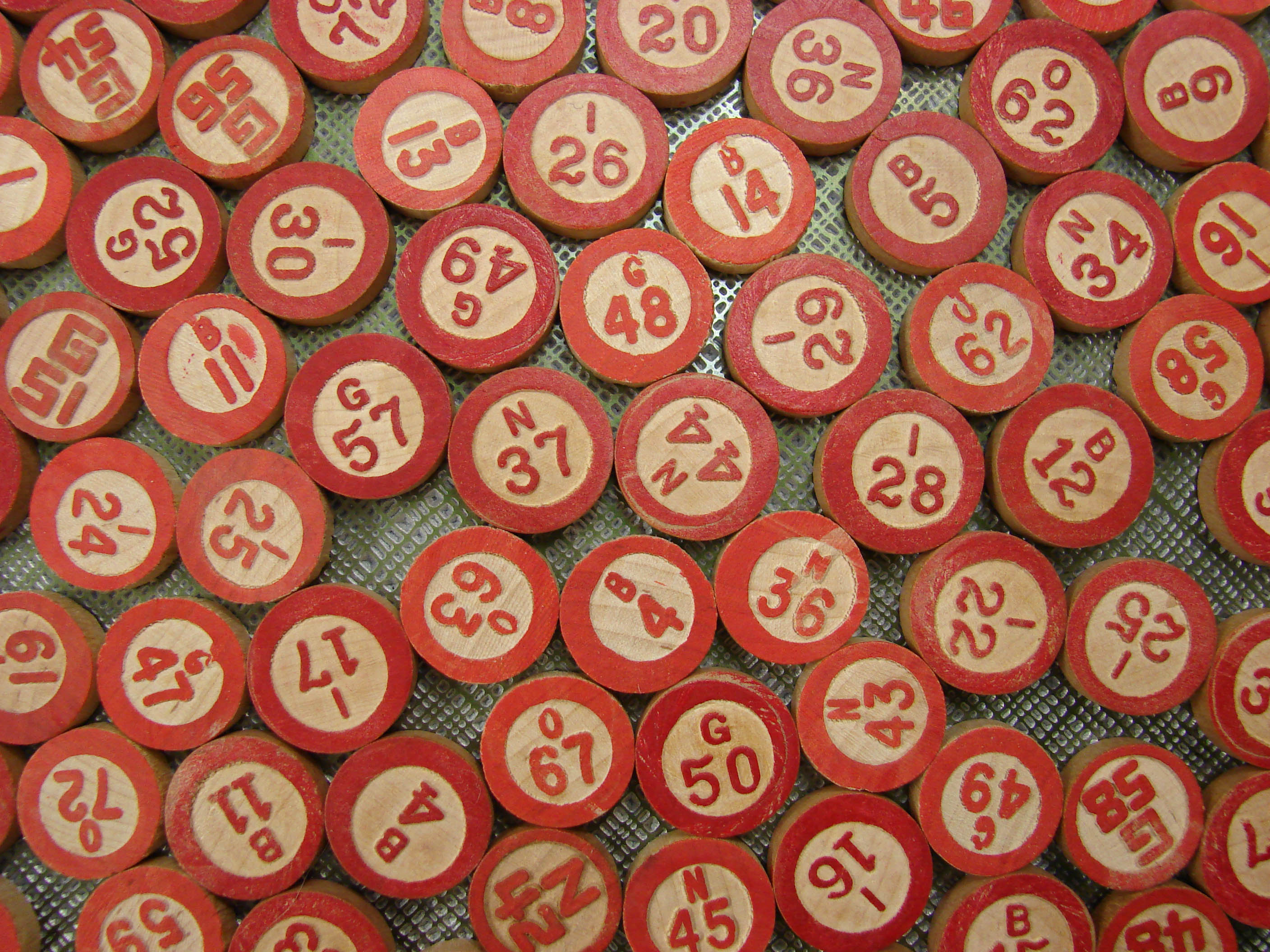
- Court: Court of Appeal of England and Wales
- Decided: 8 July 1976
- Citations: [1976] EWCA Civ 2, [1977] 1 WLR 527
- Cases cited: Jones v Lock, Richards v Delbridge, Re: Paradise Motor Co Ltd

Court membership
- Judges sitting: Scarman LJ; Cairns LJ; Bridge LJ

Keywords
- Trust, intention, certainty

Paul v Constance [1976] EWCA Civ 2 / [1977] 1 W.L.R. 527 is an English trust law case. It sets out what will be sufficient to establish that someone has intended to create a trust, the first of the "three certainties". It is necessary that a settlor's "words and actions ... show a clear intention to dispose of property ... so that someone else acquires a beneficial interest."

== Facts ==
Mr Constance's marriage broke down, and he moved in with Ms Paul. After a workplace accident, he received £950 in damages, and following discussions with a bank manager, paid it into a new joint account. They were unmarried, so the account was put in Mr Constance's name. He said repeatedly, ‘the money is as much yours as mine’. They also paid in joint bingo winnings too, and they made a £150 withdrawal, which they split. But 13 months later, Mr Constance died without a will. Ms Paul claimed the account was hers. Mrs Constance reappeared and claimed the money was hers.

== Judgment ==
The Court of Appeal held that the parties' words and conduct demonstrated that he wished for the money to be held on trust for Mr Constance and Ms Paul jointly. Scarman LJ gave the first judgment.

we are dealing with ... people, unaware of the subtleties of equity, but understanding very well indeed their own domestic situation. It is right that one should consider the various things that were said and done by the plaintiff and Mr Constance during their time together against their own background and in their own circumstances.

[...]

When one bears in mind the unsophisticated character of the deceased and his relationship with the plaintiff during the last few years or his life, Mr. Wilson submits that the words that he did use on more than one occasion, "This money is as much yours as mine," convey clearly a present declaration that the existing fund was as much the plaintiff’s as his own. The judge accepted that conclusion. I think that he was well justified in doing so and, indeed, I think that he was right to do so. There are, as Mr. Wilson reminded us, other features in the history of the relationship between the plaintiff and the deceased which support the interpretation of those words as an express declaration of trust. I have already described the interview with the bank manager when the account was opened. I have mentioned also the putting of the "bingo" winnings into the account and the one withdrawal for the benefit of both of them.

Bridge LJ concurred, and quoted Richards v Delbridge where Sir George Jessel MR said, "It is true he need not use the words 'I declare myself a trustee,' but he must do something which is equivalent to it, and use expressions which have that meaning, for, however anxious the court may be to carry out a man’s intentions, it is not at liberty to construe words otherwise than according to their proper meaning."

Cairns LJ also concurred.

== See also ==
- English trusts law
- Barclays Bank Ltd v Quistclose Investments Ltd [1970] AC 567
