= Hunter v Moss =

1993 English trusts law case

- Court: Court of Appeal of England and Wales
- Decided: 21 December 1993
- Citations: [1993] EWCA Civ 11, [1994] 1 WLR 452
- Transcript: Full text of judgment

Case history
- Prior action: [1993] 1 WLR 934

Court membership
- Judges sitting: Dillon LJ, Mann LJ and Hirst LJ

Case opinions
- Dillon LJ

Keywords
- Three certainties

Hunter v Moss [1994] 1 WLR 452 is an English trusts law case from the Court of Appeal concerning the certainty of subject matter necessary to form a trust. Moss promised Hunter 50 shares in his company as part of an employment contract, but failed to provide them. Hunter brought a claim against Moss for them, arguing that Moss's promise had created a trust over those 50 shares. The constitution of trusts normally requires that trust property be segregated from non-trust property for the trust to be valid, as in Re London Wine Co (Shippers) Ltd. On this occasion, however, both Colin Rimer in the High Court of Justice and Dillon, Mann and Hirst LJJ in the Court of Appeal felt that, because this case dealt with intangible rather than tangible property, this rule did not have to be applied. Because all the shares were identical, it did not matter that they were not segregated, and the trust was valid. The decision was applied in Re Harvard Securities, creating a rule that segregation is not always necessary when the trust concerns intangible, identical property.

The academic reaction to Hunter was mixed. While some called it "fair, sensible and workable", or noted that "Logically the decision in Hunter v Moss appears a sensible one", Alastair Hudson felt that "doctrinally, it is suggested that the decision in Hunter v Moss is wrong and should not be relied upon", because it contradicted existing property law and drew a distinction between tangible and intangible property he felt to be "spurious".

== Facts ==
Moss was the managing director and son of the founder of Moss Electrical Co Ltd. He owned 950 of the 1,000 issued shares. In September 1986 he said that Hunter, the finance director, could have 50 of these shares as part of his employment. Crucially, he made no statement or trust involving the other 900 shares. This gift of 50 shares was never implemented because of tax concerns, the risks of a takeover, and mainly because Moss changed his mind. Hunter brought a case against Moss claiming his 50 shares, which rested on two issues. First, whether the language used was sufficient to create a trust, and second, whether or not the trust failed to provide the three certainties because of the lack of segregation between the shares.

A valid trust requires three certainties – certainty of intention (that the donor intends to make a trust) certainty of subject matter (that the property to make up the trust is identifiable) and certainty of object (that the beneficiaries are identifiable). The normal rule for certainty of subject matter is that the property intended to be in the trust be separated from other property, showing clarity in what is intended to be trust property. If there is no clear separation, the trust will fail. Re London Wine Co concerned creditors of a bankrupt wine trading company, who argued that they should be able to claim the bottles of wine they had paid for. The problem was that these bottles were not individually identifiable, and Oliver J held that:

I appreciate the point taken that the subject matter is a part of a homogeneous mass so that specific identity is of as little as importance as it is, for instance, in the case of money. Nevertheless, as it seems to me, to create a trust it must be possible to ascertain with certainty not only what the interest of the beneficiary is to be but to what property it is to attach.

== Judgment ==
In the High Court Colin Rimer QC, sitting as a Deputy High Court Judge, held that since the shares were all identical, the lack of segregation between them did not invalidate the trust. The standard case in this area, Re London Wine Co (Shippers) Ltd, was distinguished because the subject matter there was potentially different, while all of Moss's shares were identical. Rimer J instead cited with approval Rollestone v National Bank of Commerce in St. Louis, a decision of the Supreme Court of Minnesota where it was held that there was no need for segregation in such a situation.

On appeal, the Court of Appeal held there was a valid trust. Giving the leading judgment Dillon LJ said the trust was valid, first, because it was necessary for there to be one to enforce the terms of the employment contract. Second, he distinguished Re London Wine Co, saying, "That case is a long way from the present. It is concerned with the appropriation of chattels and when property in chattels passes. We are concerned with a declaration of trust". He instead concluded that as there was no tangible distinction between the shares, and as such no reason to hold the trust void just because the shares had not been segregated. As such, the trust was valid.

== Significance ==
Hunter is commonly cited as having said that with intangible, identical property, it is not necessary to segregate the trust and non-trust sections. In fact Dillon LJ never said such a thing, although "it is the obvious conclusion to draw [from his statement]". He merely distinguished Re London Wine Co, allowing him to decide the case on the facts alone. Hunter was reluctantly applied in Re Harvard Securities, where Neuberger J reluctantly decided that it had said there was no need to segregate intangible property.

Outside of England and Wales, the decision has not been applied. In White v Shortall, the Supreme Court of New South Wales explicitly rejected Dillon's reasoning. Campbell J nonetheless reached the same conclusion (that a settlor could declare a valid trust of an unascertained parcel of shares that was part of a larger fund), albeit by different reasoning.

The case met a mixed reaction from academics. Jill Martin, in an article in the Conveyancer and Property Lawyer, argued that the case was "fair, sensible and workable... [it] is a welcome example of the court's policy of preventing a clearly intended trust from failing for uncertainty". Alison Jones, in a different article for the same journal, said that "Logically the decision in Hunter v Moss appears a sensible one", but noted that it did create "difficult questions". Other academics were more critical, with David Hayton writing in the Law Quarterly Review that "the unreserved judgment of Dillon LJ.... may well come to be stigmatised".

Alastair Hudson wrote that "doctrinally, it is suggested that the decision in Hunter v Moss is wrong and should not be relied upon". Firstly, it contradicts an element of property law which requires there be "specific and identifiable property" to be subject to a property right. Secondly, he suggests it is difficult to see why there should be a dividing line between intangible and tangible property, since there are some principles which apply to both. 500 ball bearings are tangible, but identical; under Hunter, there is no reason these should also not require separation, so the distinction between tangible and intangible is thus "spurious".

== Bibliography ==
- Hayton, David (1994). "Uncertainty of subject-matter of trusts". Law Quarterly Review. 110 (July). Sweet & Maxwell. ISSN 0023-933X.
- Hudson, Alastair (2009). Equity and Trusts (6th ed.). Routledge-Cavendish. ISBN 978-0-415-49771-8.
- Jones, Alison (1993). "Creating a trust over an unascertained part of a homogeneous whole". Conveyancer and Property Lawyer. 1993 (November/December). Sweet & Maxwell. ISSN 0010-8200.
- Martin, Jill. Conveyancer and Property Lawyer. Sweet & Maxwell. ISSN 0010-8200.
- Norris, William (1995). "Uncertainty and informality: Hunter v Moss". Private Client Business. 1995 (1). Sweet & Maxwell. ISSN 0967-229X.
- Ockelton, Mark (1994). "Share and Share Alike?". Cambridge Law Journal. 53 (3). Cambridge University Press: 448–450. doi:10.1017/S0008197300080818. ISSN 0008-1973. S2CID 143917091.
