= G Scammell & Nephew Ltd v Ouston =

G Scammell and Nephew Ltd v HC&JG Ouston
- Court: House of Lords
- Citation: [1941] 1 AC 251

Court membership
- Judges sitting: Viscount Simon LC, Viscount Maugham, Lord Russell and Lord Wright

Keywords
- consideration

G Scammell and Nephew Ltd v HC&JG Ouston [1941] 1 AC 251 is an English contract law case, concerning the certainty of an agreement. It stands as an example of a relatively rare case where a court cannot find some way in which a contract can be made to work.

== Facts ==
The claimants wished to trade in their old van for a new van with the defendants. They agreed a price for the old van’s trade in, but only that they would pay for the new van ‘on hire purchase terms’ for two years. The defendants subsequently pulled out of the agreement, and when the claimants attempted to sue, the defendants argued that the agreement could not be enforced because it was too uncertain.

== Judgment ==
The House of Lords held this was too vague for the contract to be enforced. There was no objective standard by which the court could know what price was intended or what a reasonable price might be. Viscount Simon LC, Viscount Maugham, Lord Russell and Lord Wright all gave speeches.

== See also ==
- Contract
- English contract law
