= Blanshard Stamp =

The Right Honourable Sir Blanshard Stamp

Lord Justice of Appeal

Sir Edward Blanshard Stamp (21 March 1905 – 20 June 1984), also styled The Rt. Hon. Lord Justice Stamp, was an English lawyer, a Lord Justice of Appeal and a member of the Privy Council.

The son of Alfred Edward Stamp, Stamp was educated at Gresham's School, Holt, and the Inns of Court. A barrister, he became a High Court judge of the Chancery Division and in 1971 a Lord Justice of Appeal. He was appointed a privy counsellor on 5 April 1971.

He should not be confused with antecedents of the same name, Mr Edward Blanshard Stamp (1805 – 1847), of Brighton, and Mr Edward Blanshard Stamp (d. 1908), of Hampstead.

He was married to Mildred Evelyn Stamp (née Poer O'Shee).

== Arms ==
Coat of arms of Blanshard Stamp
Motto Miseris Succurrere
