= Eric Sachs =

British barrister and judge

The Right Honourable Sir Eric Sachs MBE TD
- Portrait of Sachs, by Madame Yevonde

Lord Justice of Appeal
- In office 1966–1973

Justice of the High Court
- In office 1954–1966

Personal details
- Born: Eric Leopold Otho Sachs; 23 July 1898 London, UK
- Died: 1 September 1979 (aged 81) Wadhurst, East Sussex, UK
- Spouse: Janet Margaret Goddard (married 1934)
- Children: 2
- Education: Charterhouse School, Godalming, Surrey
- Alma mater: Christ Church, Oxford
- Occupation: Barrister, judge

Sir Eric Leopold Otho Sachs, MBE, TD (23 July 1898 – 1 September 1979) was a British barrister and judge. He was a High Court judge from 1954 to 1966 and then a Lord Justice of Appeal until 1973.

== Biography ==
Sachs was born in London. His father was an architect, and his grandfather had emigrated from Germany to England. Sachs was educated at Charterhouse School and served as a gunnery officer in the Royal Artillery in the First World War, from 1917 to 1919, receiving wounds to his left hand. After being demobilised, he read law at Christ Church, Oxford, graduating after five terms in 1920.

He was called to the bar at the Middle Temple in 1921, and was a pupil barrister under Wilfrid Lewis. He practised on the Oxford circuit and in London, and became a King's Counsel in 1938. He was also appointed Recorder of Dudley in 1938.

He served in the staff of the adjutant-general in the War Office in the Second World War, starting as a second lieutenant but rapidly promoted to brigadier. He was appointed MBE in 1941 for his war work. He transferred to political warfare - part of intelligence - in 1942 and was seconded to the Foreign Office to produce handbooks on the administration of the territories to be liberated by the Allies.

Demobilised again in 1945, he returned to legal practice as a barrister. He led a team of barristers who collaborated with Sydney Littlewood and other solicitors from the Law Society in formulating the legal aid scheme created under the Legal Aid and Advice Act 1949. He became a bencher at Middle Temple in 1947 and served as Treasurer in 1967, reforming the inn's governance and finances. He was Gresham Professor of Law from 1946 to 1950.

In addition to his legal practice, he continued with part-time judicial office, serving as a Commissioner of Assize and investigating allegations of corruption in the Gold Coast in 1946. He was Recorder of Stoke-on-Trent from 1943 to 1954, and leader of the Oxford circuit in 1953 and 1954. He was appointed to the High Court bench in 1954 and received the customary knighthood, joining the Probate, Divorce and Admiralty Division. He was transferred to the Queen's Bench Division in 1960, and was promoted to the Court of Appeal in 1966, also joining the Privy Council. Amongst other cases, he heard and dismissed the appeal of the students convicted after the Garden House riot in 1970. He became increasingly deaf in his later years and retired in 1973, but continued to sit as a judge occasionally.

Among his later cases were Evans Marshall and Co Ltd v Bertola SA and British Crane Hire Corporation Ltd v Ipswich Plant Hire Ltd, both ruled in 1973, and Lloyds Bank Ltd v Bundy in 1974. In Evans Marshall he recast the issue of determining whether damages would offer an adequate remedy in commercial cases, where the court refused to grant an injunction, into an alternative format:

"The standard question in relation to the grant of an injunction, Are damages an adequate remedy?" might perhaps, in the light of the authorities of recent years, be re-written as, "Is it just, in all the circumstances, that a plaintiff should be confined to his remedy in damages?".

In 1934, Sachs married Janet Margaret Goddard (d.2005), daughter of Rayner Goddard, later Baron Goddard, who was Lord Chief Justice of England from 1946 to 1958. He retired to East Sussex, and died at home in Wadhurst after an operation. He was survived by his wife, and their son and daughter.
