= Jones v Lock =

English legal case

- Court: Court of Appeal in Chancery
- Citation: (1865) 1 Ch App 25

Case opinions
- Lord Cranworth LC

Keywords
- Certainty, express trusts

Jones v Lock (1865) 1 Ch App 25 is an English trusts law case, concerning the formality for creating a gift, and the possibility that if the gift were not properly completed with the required legal form, a trust could be found. The Court of Appeal in Chancery held that equity would not "perfect an imperfect gift" by creating a trust, if the proper formality for the gift had not been completed.

== Facts ==
A father returned from a business trip without a gift for his son. When the family told him off, he put a £900 cheque in the baby’s hand, and said

look you here, I give this to baby; it is for himself and I am going to put it away for him, and will give him a great deal more along with it.

The wife said the baby might tear it, and the father said, ‘it is his own, and he may do what he likes with it’. He locked it in the safe and died six days later. It was argued that although there was never an outright transfer, because he had not actually endorsed the cheque by signing it, there was no trust of the cheque for the baby. "Based on the surrounding circumstances," apparently the father was "in a fit of pique," according to one casebook.

== Judgment ==
The Court of Appeal in Chancery held that there was no trust, because the father’s intention was an outright transfer. They refused to perfect an imperfect gift through a successful declaration of trust. Lord Cranworth LC gave the judgment of the court.

== See also ==
- English trusts law
