= McPhail v Doulton =

1970 English trust law case

- Court: House of Lords
- Full case name: Re Baden's Deed Trusts (No 1)
- Decided: 6 May 1970
- Citations: [1970] UKHL 1 [1971] AC 424

Court membership
- Judges sitting: Lord Reid; Lord Hodson; Lord Guest; Viscount Dilhorne; Lord Wilberforce

Case opinions
- Lord Wilberforce, Lord Hodson, Lord Guest

Keywords
- Certainty, express trusts

McPhail v Doulton [1970] UKHL 1, also known as Re Baden's Deed Trusts (No 1) is a leading English trusts law case by the House of Lords on the certainty of beneficiaries. It held that so long as any given claimant can clearly be determined to be a beneficiary, or not, a trust is valid. The Lords also remanded the case to the Court of Appeal to be decided on this new legal principle as Re Baden's Deed Trusts (No 2).

== Facts ==
Bertram Baden executed a deed settling a non-charitable trust for the benefit of the staff of Matthew Hall & Co Ltd and their relatives and dependents. The objects clause provided that:

The trustees shall apply the net income of the fund in making at their absolute discretion grants to or for the benefit of any of the officers and employees or ex-officers or ex-employees of the company or to any relatives or dependants of any such persons in such amounts at such times and on such conditions (if any) as they think fit.

The validity of the trust was challenged, averring that the objects were insufficiently certain.

== Judgment ==
Lord Wilberforce, after noting the fact that the settlor had left his property on trust, with instructions to distribute according to the trustees' choices (and, therefore, not equally among the potential beneficiaries), stated the following:

As a matter of reason, to hold that a principle of equal division applies to trusts such as the present is certainly paradoxical. Equal division is surely the last thing the settlor ever intended: equal division among all may, probably would, produce a result beneficial to none. Why suppose that the court would lend itself to a whimsical execution? and as regards authority, I do not find that the nature of the trust, and of the court's powers over trusts, calls for any such rigid rule. Equal division may be sensible and has been decreed, in cases of family trusts, for a limited class, here there is life in the maxim 'equality is equity,' but the cases provide numerous examples where this has not been so, and a different type of execution has been ordered, appropriate to the circumstances.

Lord Wilberforce then went on to discuss the authority for this principle, which is compelling. As to the value of the facts, the comment above was a powerful reason for departing from the Broadway Cottages case ([1955] Ch 20), which was the basis for the strict test for certainty of object of discretionary trusts, as overruled in McPhail (for which see below).

== Significance ==
The case fundamentally restated the law in relation to certainty of objects for discretionary trusts, one of the three certainties required to form a trust.

For a trust to be valid, "It is clear law that a trust (other than a charitable trust) must be for ascertainable beneficiaries".

Prior to McPhail, the law was that for a discretionary trust one also had to be able to draw up a complete list of beneficiaries. However, in McPhail the House of Lords restated the law, abandoning the "complete list" test in favour of an "is or is not" test. Lord Wilberforce phrased the new test of certainty thus:

Can it be said with certainty that any given individual is or is not a member of the class. This was the same test which the courts had previously applied to powers.

On the facts, it was held that it was perfectly possible to say, looking at an individual whether they were either an officer or employee, an ex-officer or ex-employee, or a relative or dependent of one, and the validity of the trust was upheld.

=== Criticisms ===
The two key criticisms of the "in or out" test (also known as the "is or is not" or "given postulant" tests) for discretionary beneficiaries were:

- A trustee's duty to distribute could only be properly performed if he considered every possible claimant
- The court could only execute the trust, if the trustee failed to do so, by percentage division of the trust fund

Lord Wilberforce, in relaxing the generally accepted structures of trust law prior to the decision, met these two objections as follows. It was only necessary, he held, to consider every possible claimant, if one was fully distributing the fund, i.e., essentially winding it up. In such cases he would necessarily make a wider and more systematic survey in deciding to make grants. But there was no requirement to draw up a complete list of names, as indeed the law did not require for the exercise of a discretionary power. Further he felt that the court being called upon to execute the trust if the trustee would not do so was a theoretical rather than a practical difficulty. He pointed out that in cases that had reached the courts, there were no examples of a trustee refusing to act in that manner. But in any event, the court had powers to remove and replace trustees, who could then act properly. Further, it was not the case, in his view, that distribution was impossible unless there was an equal division, and he cited several older cases, prior to 1801, in which the court exercised discretion in relation to the making of distributions.

=== After McPhail ===
The case at the centre of McPhail was remanded to the Court of Appeal, to be decided using the principles set out in McPhail, under the name Re Baden's Deed Trusts (No 2).

Although McPhail is rarely mentioned in the same breath as other revolutionary decisions, such as Donoghue v Stevenson, Hedley Byrne & Co Ltd v Heller & Partners Ltd, and Dunlop Pneumatic Tyre v Selfridge and Co. Ltd., it nonetheless fundamentally restated the law of trusts, and created the discretionary trust as a far more viable and accessible option in terms of estate planning, and significantly reduced the strictures associated with such trusts.

== See also ==
- English trusts law
