= Twinsectra Ltd v Yardley =

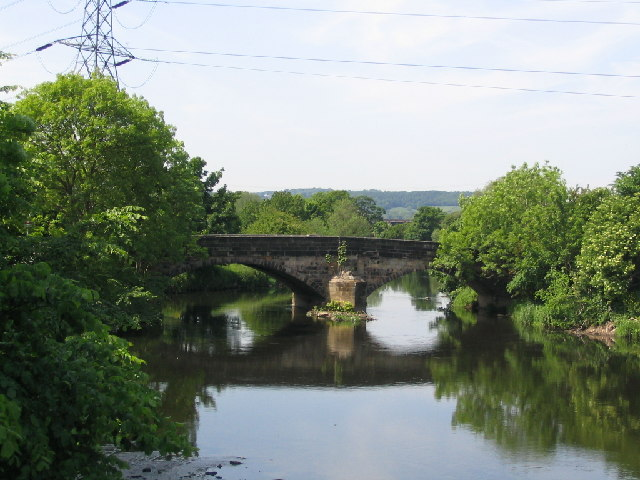
- Apperley Bridge
- Court: House of Lords
- Decided: 21 March 2002
- Citations: [2002] UKHL 12 [2002] 2 WLR 802 [2002] 2 AC 164 [2002] 2 All ER 377 [2002] NPC 47 [2002] 3 WLUK 573 [2002] N.P.C. 47
- Transcript: Full text from parliament.uk

Court membership
- Judges sitting: Lord Slynn; Lord Steyn; Lord Hoffmann; Lord Hutton; Lord Millett

Keywords
- Quistclose trust; Dishonest assistance

Twinsectra Ltd v Yardley [2002] UKHL 12 is a leading case in English trusts law. It provides authoritative rulings in the areas of Quistclose trusts and dishonest assistance.

== Facts ==
Twinsectra Ltd sued an entrepreneur, Mr Yardley, and two solicitors, Mr Sims and Mr Paul Leach (of Godalming), for failing to repay a £1m loan. Twinsectra Ltd had given £1m to Mr Sims to pass onto Mr Yardley as a loan for buying real estate near Apperley Bridge, Bradford. Twinsectra Ltd had said it would only give the loan if someone guaranteed Mr Yardley's repayment. Mr Yardley's solicitor, Mr Leach, refused to give the guarantee, but Mr Sims accepted. Mr Sims had owed £1.5m to Mr Yardley from previous dealings. They agreed that if Mr Sims took the loan into his account first, the prior debts would be considered repaid. Mr Sims promised Twinsectra Ltd to not release the money unless the loan conditions were satisfied. The clause read as follows.

"The loan moneys will be retained by us [Sims & Roper] until such time as they are applied in the acquisition of property on behalf of our client. The loan moneys will be utilised solely for the acquisition of property on behalf of our client and for no other purposes".

However, Mr Sims then gave the money to Mr Yardley’s solicitor anyway (Mr Leach), who passed it on to Mr Yardley. Instead of using the money for the investment, Mr Yardley, in breach of contract, used £357,720.11 to pay off some of his debts. Twinsectra Ltd sued Mr Yardley to get the money back and also both solicitors. Mr Sims was now bankrupt. Twinsectra argued the money was bound by a trust, that Mr Sims was in breach of trust, and Mr Leach dishonestly assisted the breach.

The trial judge found that Mr Leach was not dishonest because he honestly believed that the undertaking did not run with the money. However, he made a contradictory finding that Leach had deliberately shut his eyes. In the Court of Appeal, Potter LJ held that Mr Leach was in fact dishonest, precisely because he had deliberately shut his eyes. A presumption in the transferor’s favour can only be made where there is no evidence that there was an intention to create a trust, or make a gift, or make a loan of the property to the transferee.

== Judgment ==
The House of Lords all held the loan from Twinsectra Ltd was held on trust by the solicitors. Lord Slynn, Lord Steyn, Lord Hoffmann and Lord Hutton held that the money was held on express trust, created through the terms of the agreement between Twinsectra Ltd and Mr Sims. It then held (controversially; an issue revisited in Barlow Clowes Ltd v Eurotrust Ltd) that Mr Leach had not been dishonest enough for accessory liability. It was necessary for Mr Leach to have realised that he had been acting dishonestly. Lord Millett dissented.

He firstly held that the nature of the trust, by which the solicitors held Twinsectra Ltd's loan money was a resulting trust, with a power to apply the money in accordance with the loan contract's terms. He viewed this to be the proper characterisation of this and all Quistclose trusts. He then would have held that Mr Leach was dishonest enough.

Lord Slynn and Lord Steyn gave two short opinions, agreeing with Lord Hoffmann and Lord Hutton.

Lord Hoffmann said the following.

12. [...] The terms of the trust upon which Sims held the money must be found in the undertaking which they gave to Twinsectra as a condition of payment. Clauses 1 and 2 of that undertaking made it clear that the money was not to be at the free disposal of Mr Yardley. Sims were not to part with the money to Mr Yardley or anyone else except for the purpose of enabling him to acquire property.

13. In my opinion the effect of the undertaking was to provide that the money in the Sims client account should remain Twinsectra's money until such time as it was applied for the acquisition of property in accordance with the undertaking. For example, if Mr Yardley went bankrupt before the money had been so applied, it would not have formed part of his estate, as it would have done if Sims had held it in trust for him absolutely. The undertaking would have ensured that Twinsectra could get it back. It follows that Sims held the money in trust for Twinsectra, but subject to a power to apply it by way of loan to Mr Yardley in accordance with the undertaking. No doubt Sims also owed fiduciary obligations to Mr Yardley in respect of the exercise of the power, but we need not concern ourselves with those obligations because in fact the money was applied wholly for Mr Yardley's benefit.

14. The judge gave two reasons for rejecting a trust. The first was that the terms of the undertaking were too vague. It did not specify any particular property for which the money was to be used. The second was that Mr Ackerman, the moving spirit behind Twinsectra, did not intend to create a trust. He set no store by clauses 1 and 2 of the undertaking and was content to rely on the guarantee in clause 3 as Twinsectra's security for repayment.

15. I agree that the terms of the undertaking are very unusual. Solicitors acting for both lender and borrower (for example, a building society and a house buyer) commonly give an undertaking to the lender that they will not part with the money save in exchange for a duly executed charge over the property which the money is being used to purchase. The undertaking protects the lender against finding himself unsecured. But Twinsectra was not asking for any security over the property. Its security was clause 3 of the Sims undertaking. So the purpose of the undertaking was unclear. There was nothing to prevent Mr Yardley, having acquired a property in accordance with the undertaking, from mortgaging it to the hilt and spending the proceeds on something else. So it is hard to see why it should have mattered to Twinsectra whether the immediate use of the money was to acquire property. The judge thought it might have been intended to give some protective colour to a claim against the Solicitors Indemnity Fund if Sims failed to repay the loan in accordance with the undertaking. A claim against the fund would depend upon showing that the undertaking was given in the context of an underlying transaction within the usual business of a solicitor: United Bank of Kuwait Ltd v Hammoud [1988] 1 WLR 1051. Nothing is more usual than for solicitors to act on behalf of clients in the acquisition of property. On the other hand, an undertaking to repay a straightforward unsecured loan might be more problematic.

16. However, the fact that the undertaking was unusual does not mean that it was void for uncertainty. The charge of uncertainty is levelled against the terms of the power to apply the funds. "The acquisition of property" was said to be too vague. But a power is sufficiently certain to be valid if the court can say that a given application of the money does or does not fall within its terms: see In re Baden's Deed Trusts [1971] AC 424. And there is no dispute that the £357,720.11 was not applied for the acquisition of property.

Lord Hoffmann then said that the defendant must be conscious of the fact that he was "transgressing ordinary standards of honest behaviour" in order to be liable for dishonest assistance. He rejected Lord Millett's dissenting judgment on the ground it departed from Royal Brunei.

Lord Hutton's judgment considered three possible tests in the area of accessory liability: a purely subjective test, a purely objective test and a "combined test". He interpreted Lord Nicholls in Royal Brunei Airlines v Tan to have articulated a combined test: for a person to be held liable as an accessory to a breach of trust, he had to have acted dishonestly by the ordinary standards of reasonable and honest people and have been himself aware that by those standards he was acting dishonestly.

He rejected the purely subjective test outright, and rejected the purely objective test as his Lordship regarded a finding by a judge that a defendant has been dishonest as a grave finding, particularly against a professional man. Therefore, he considered it "less than just for the law to permit a finding that a defendant had been 'dishonest' in assisting in a breach of trust where he knew of the facts which created the trust and its breach but had not been aware that what he was doing would be regarded by honest men as being dishonest". Lord Hutton rejected Lord Millett's dissenting judgment as his Lordship considered Lord Millett to have adopted a purely objective test.

Lord Millett's dissent maintained that Royal Brunei decided that the test of dishonesty is largely objective, although account must be taken of subjective considerations such as the defendant’s experience and intelligence and his actual state of knowledge at the relevant time. But it is not necessary that he should actually have appreciated that he was acting dishonestly; it is sufficient that he was. The question is whether an honest person would appreciate that what he was doing was wrong or improper, not whether the defendant himself actually appreciated this. His Lordship gave 3 reasons for this:

- Consciousness of wrongdoing is an aspect of mens rea and an appropriate condition of criminal liability: it is not an appropriate condition of civil liability.
- The objective test is in accordance with Barnes v Addy and the traditional doctrine.
- The claim for "knowing assistance" is the equitable counterpart of the economic torts. These are intentional torts; negligence is not sufficient and dishonesty is not necessary. Liability depends on knowledge. A requirement of subjective dishonesty introduces an unnecessary and unjustified distinction between the elements of the equitable claim and those of the tort of wrongful interference with the performance of a contract.

By applying the Royal Brunei test, Lord Millett held that Leach was dishonest.

== Significance ==
Lord Millett's analysis of the Quistclose trust closely mirrored the same approach he had suggested twenty years earlier in an article in the Law Quarterly Review. He suggested there are four possible answers to the question of the nature of a Quistclose trust. The beneficial interest could lie with (1) the lender, (2) the borrower, (3) an ultimate purpose, and (4) no-one, in the sense that the beneficial interest remains "in suspense". The beneficial interest could not remain in suspense, a purpose trust would be void under English law, and if the borrower held the beneficial interest the remaining money could not go back to the lender. So, Lord Millett concluded that the beneficial interest must remain with the lender, until the purpose for which the funds are lent is fulfilled on "resulting trust".

He says the following regarding the role of intention in passing the beneficial interest of a resulting trust, referring to and endorsing Dr. Chamber's model:

92. ... [A resulting trust] responds to the absence of an intention on the part of the

transferor to pass the entire beneficial interest, not to a positive intention to retain it. Insofar as the transfer does not exhaust the entire beneficial interest, the resulting trust

is a default trust which fills the gap and leaves no room for any part to be in suspense.

By contrast, Lord Hoffmann characterised the trust as being an express, rather than a resulting trust. Although there may not have been words used to this effect, the solicitor's undertaking that the money should only be used for one purpose so that the money is not at the borrower's free disposal, was sufficient intent to create a trust.

This discourse has resulted in continued academic controversy, with it being argued that automatic resulting trusts following a failure of purpose defy legal analysis.

== See also ==
- English trusts law
- Royal Brunei Airlines Sdn Bhd v Tan [1995] 2 AC 378
