= Re Nanwa Gold Mines Ltd =

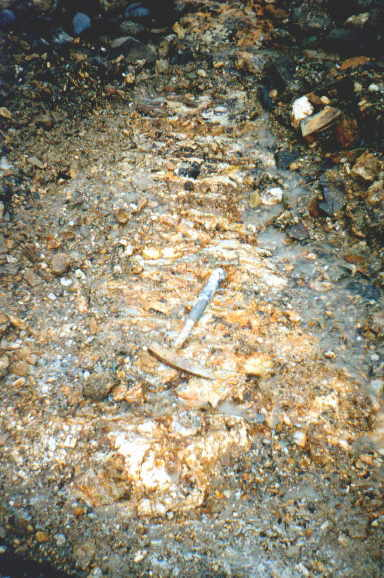
- Court: High Court
- Full case name: Re Nanwa Gold Mines, Ltd. sub nom Ballantyne v Nanwa Gold Mines, Ltd. and Another
- Decided: 29 July 1955
- Citations: [1955] 1 WLR 880 [1955] 3 All ER 219

Court membership
- Judge sitting: Harman J

Keywords
- Quistclose trusts

Re Nanwa Gold Mines Ltd [1955] 1 WLR 880 was a trust law decision relating to subscription monies for shares and what would subsequently come to be known as Quistclose trusts. The court held that where subscription monies had been paid over to enable the company to accomplish a specific purpose, if that purpose failed then the money was held on trust for the subscribers and did not form part of the assets of the company. Even though the decision was only a first-instance ex tempore decision, it has been repeatedly upheld, including by the House of Lords in Barclays Bank Ltd v Quistclose Investments Ltd [1968] UKHL 4

== Facts ==
On 28 July 1953 the company, Nanwa Gold Mines, Ltd., devised a scheme whereby it would reduce its capital and issue one million new shares with a par value of one shilling to generate fresh capital. Without such capital it would be unable to continue its business. Notices were sent to the shareholders advising them of the proposed scheme, and inviting them to subscribe for the new share issuance. In that notice it was stated:

It will be noted that this [share] issue is conditional upon the passing of the resolutions at the extraordinary general meeting of the company to be held on Aug. 20, 1953, and the subsequent sanction of the court to the reduction of the company's capital. Should either of these conditions not be fulfilled, application moneys will be refunded and meanwhile will be retained in a separate account ...

The proposed share issuance was heavily under subscribed, and in September of 1953 the debenture holders appointed receivers. The proposed scheme was formally abandoned by a resolution of the board of directors in January 1954. The debenture holders issued a summons for directions as to whether the subscription monies which were received formed part of the assets of the company or were held on trust for the persons who subscribed for shares.

== Decision ==
The case came before Harman J. He summed up the issue concisely:

The point is a short one: Is the relationship of the subscriber and the company that of creditor and debtor, or has the subscriber a lien on this fund or an equity against it so as to be able to attach it for the payment of his debt without allowing other creditors of the company to share with him?

The judge admitted this was a novel point, and that there seemed to be no authority directly in point. He also admitted, frankly, that "it occurred to [him] quite early in the argument that if the persons who sent their money on the faith of this document had no lien on the separate account there was something very wrong with the law on this subject."

He then discussed the paucity of authorities directly on point, and reviewed certain academic commentary which he pronounced to be unhelpful. He further reviewed section 51(3) of the Companies Act 1948 which imposes an obligation on companies to maintain subscriber funds in a separate account (as the company had done here).

Then, without being explicit as to whether he was holding that the subscribers had a lien or the benefit of a trust, he held that they would be entitled to return of the subscription monies. The paragraphs which precede that determination refer only to the possibility of a trust and do not mention the word lien, and so the inference taken by subsequent authorities is that the ruling was in favour of a trust. But some academics prefer the view that the judgment held an equitable charge arose.

In the judgment Harman J noted the conceptual difficulties with holding that a trust existed, and these issues would also cause varying degrees of consternation in other cases involving Quistclose trusts. It is noteworthy that the case of Toovey v Milne (1819) 2 B&A 683, which was heavily relied upon by Lord Wilberforce in Quistclose itself, was not cited in argument to Harman J.

== Authority ==
Despite being a short ex tempore first instance decision, Re Nanwa Gold Mines has never seriously been doubted. The case was commented upon briefly in Barclays Bank v Quistclose Investments where Lord Wilberforce said: "I do not think it necessary to examine these cases in detail, nor to comment on them, for I am satisfied that they do not affect the principle on which this appeal should be decided. They are merely examples which show that, in the absence of some special arrangement creating a trust (as was shown to exist in Re Nanwa Gold Mines Ltd.), payments of this kind are made upon the basis that they are to be included in the company's assets."

The case was also cited with approval in Swiss Bank Corporation v Lloyds Bank Limited [1982] AC 584, in Re Kayford Ltd [1975] 1 WLR 279 and in Bellis v Challinor [2015] EWCA Civ 59.
