= Dishonest assistance =

Dishonest assistance, or knowing assistance, is a type of third party liability under English trust law. It is usually seen as one of two liabilities established in Barnes v Addy, the other one being knowing receipt. To be liable for dishonest assistance, there must be a breach of trust or fiduciary duty by someone other than the defendant, the defendant must have helped that person in the breach, and the defendant must have a dishonest state of mind. The liability itself is well established, but the mental element of dishonesty is subject to considerable controversy which sprang from the House of Lords case Twinsectra Ltd v Yardley.

== History ==
It is a common belief that dishonest or knowing assistance originates from Lord Selbourne's judgment in Barnes v Addy:

[S]trangers are not to be made constructive trustees merely because they act as the agents of trustees in transactions, … unless those agents received and become chargeable with some part of the trust property, or unless they assist with knowledge in a dishonest and fraudulent design on the part of the trustees.

As can be seen, the judgment laid down two heads of liability: one based on receipt of trust property (knowing receipt) and the other on assisting with knowledge in a dishonest and fraudulent design (knowing assistance).

Lord Selbourne's statement has been heavily criticized, particularly on the requirement that the defaulting fiduciary / trustee has to be dishonest or fraudulent. A commentator noted that Fyler v Fyler and AG v The Corporation of Leicester, two decisions on knowing assistance in the 1840s which predated Barnes v Addy, did not mention the moral quality of the breach induced or assisted at all.

Another debate was regarding the type of knowledge that would suffice to impose liability. Peter Gibson J in Baden v Société Générale identified 5 categories of knowledge which was subject to much debate and led the courts into "tortuous convolutions".

== Nature ==
=== Secondary ===
The prevalent view is that liability for dishonest assistance is secondary. Therefore, the liability of the assistant is premised on that of the defaulting fiduciary / trustee and he/she will be jointly and severally liable with the fiduciary / trustee whom he/she assisted. However, Charles Mitchell recognized possible difficulties with this categorization: firstly, secondary liability means that the dishonest assistant will be liable for the disgorgement gains of the defaulting fiduciary / trustee, while the fiduciary / trustee will not be liable for secret profits of the dishonest assistant; secondly, the assessment of exemplary damages against the dishonest assistant will be based on that of the fiduciary / trustee which can be undesirable.

There are also views that liability for dishonest assistance should be primary. However, such views have yet to receive judicial endorsement.

=== Constructive trusteeship ===
Dishonest assistants have been frequently described by courts as constructive trustees. However, such classification is not without difficulty: dishonest assistance is often imposed even if there is no obviously identifiable property subject to the trust; also, in many cases of dishonest assistance property has reached the hands of innocent third parties who may not be under any obligation to restore it. Some commentators have sought to explain this on the basis that there is a type of constructive trust which can arise even if there is no identifiable trust property.

However, the prevalent view is that dishonest assistance is a personal liability that does not result in an imposition of constructive trust. This view has the support of Lord Millett who remarked in Dubai Aluminium Co v Salaam:

Equity gives relief against fraud by making any person sufficiently implicated in the fraud accountable in equity. In such a case he is traditionally (and I have suggested unfortunately) described as a 'constructive trustee' and is said to be 'liable to account as a constructive trustee'. But he is not in fact a trustee at all, even though he may be liable to account as if he were. He never claims to assume the position of trustee on behalf of others, and he may be liable without ever receiving or handling the trust property... In this second class of case the expressions 'constructive trust' and 'constructive trustee' create a trap... The expressions are nothing more than a formula for equitable relief'... I think we should now discard the words 'accountable as constructive trustee' in this context and substitute the words 'accountable in equity'.

== Elements ==
=== Breach of trust ===
The trustee or fiduciary of the claimant must be liable for a breach of trust or fiduciary duty. It is sufficient if the trust in question is a resulting trust or constructive trust.

Previously, it was thought that the dishonest assistant would not be liable unless the defaulting trustee was also dishonest or fraudulent, but Royal Brunei Airlines v Tan confirmed that there is no such requirement in English law. However, the requirement of dishonest or fraudulent design on the part of the defaulting fiduciary / trustee is still part of the law in Australia.

Whether a breach of trust should be required at all has been queried by a commentator, since no breach is required for the analogous tort of interference with contractual relations and if the fiduciary reasonably relies on the probity and competence of the dishonest assistant, the claimant would be left with no remedy.

=== Assistance by defendant ===
This element is a question of fact as to whether the defendant has been accessory to the misfeasance or breach of trust in question.

=== Dishonesty ===
==== The test ====
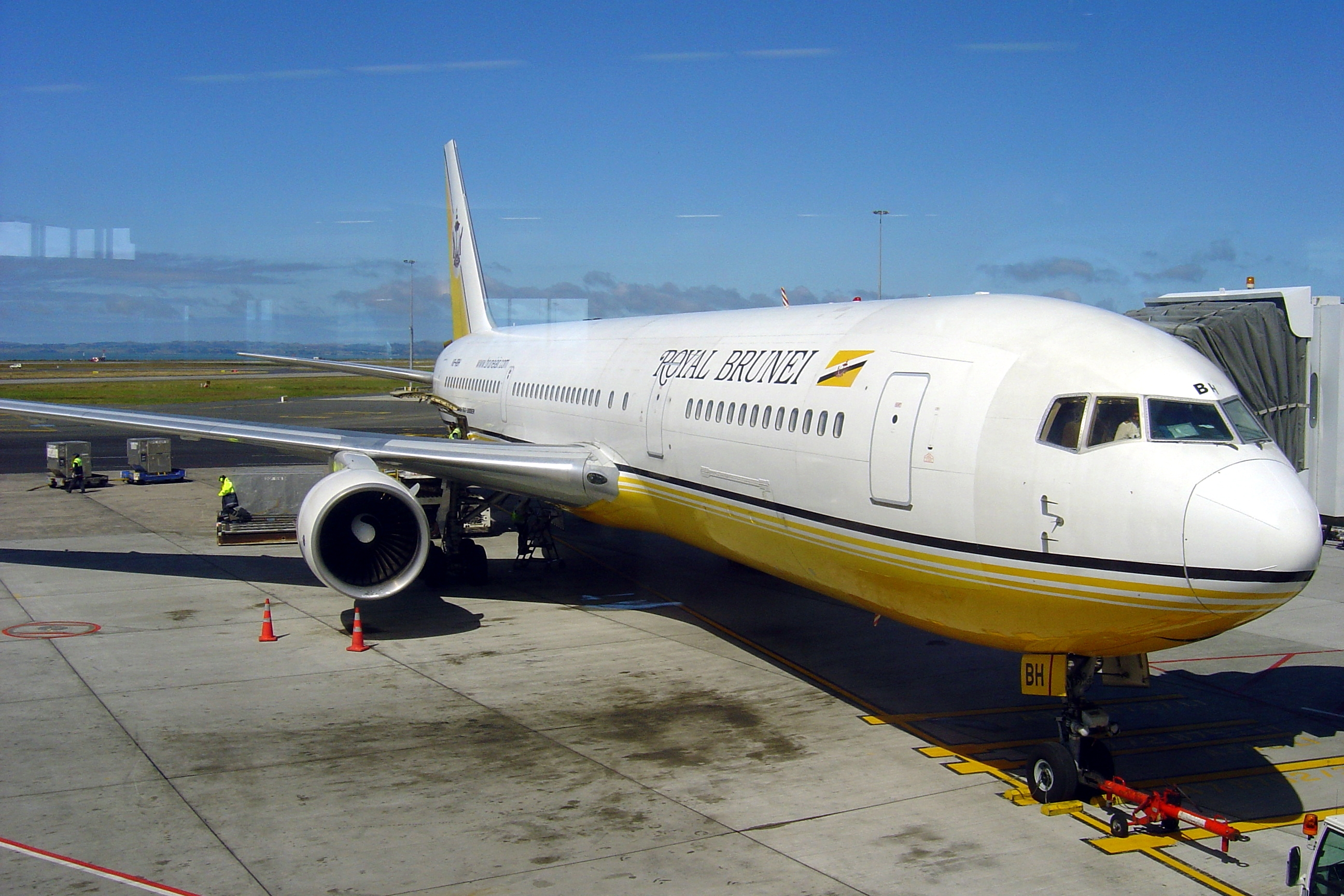
In Royal Brunei Airlines v Tan, Royal Brunei Airlines appointed Borneo Leisure Travel (‘BLT’) to act in Sabah and Sarawak as its general travel agent. The arrangement constituted BLT a trustee for the airline of the money it received from the sale of passenger and cargo transportation. The money received by BLT on behalf of the airline was paid into BLT's ordinary current account. Any balance in its current account in excess of a stated amount was transferred at times to a fixed deposit account of Mr. Tan, who was BLT's managing director and principal shareholder. BLT was required to pay the airline within 30 days, but at times from 1988 onwards, it was in arrears. In August 1992, the airline terminated the agreement and subsequently claimed against Mr. Tan in respect of the unpaid money.

Historically in England, liability would be imposed on persons who assisted in a breach of trust or fiduciary duty "with knowledge". Hence its previous name of "knowing assistance". Knowledge is still the cornerstone of the liability in Australia and Canada. The modern English terminology emerged in Royal Brunei Airlines v Tan in which the Privy Council rejected knowledge as an element of the liability and replaced it with a requirement for dishonesty. After opting for the imposition of fault-based liability, Lord Nicholls said,

Drawing the threads together, their Lordships' overall conclusion is that dishonesty is a necessary ingredient of accessory liability. It is also a sufficient ingredient. A liability in equity to make good resulting loss attaches to a person who dishonestly procures or assists in a breach of trust or fiduciary obligation. It is not necessary that, in addition, the trustee or fiduciary was acting dishonestly...'Knowingly' is better avoided as a defining ingredient of the principle...

His Lordship went on to articulate a test for dishonesty, which is generally perceived to be an objective test with some subjective characteristics:

Whatever may be the position in some criminal or other contexts (see, for instance, R v Ghosh), in the context of the accessory liability principle acting dishonestly, or with a lack of probity, which is synonymous, means simply not acting as an honest person would in the circumstances. This is an objective standard. At first sight this may seem surprising. Honesty has a connotation of subjectivity, as distinct from the objectivity of negligence. Honesty, indeed, does have a strong subjective element in that it is a description of a type of conduct assessed in the light of what a person actually knew at the time, as distinct from what a reasonable person would have known or appreciated. Further, honesty and its counterpart dishonesty are mostly concerned with advertent conduct, not inadvertent conduct. Carelessness is not dishonesty. Thus for the most part dishonesty is to be equated with conscious impropriety. However, these subjective characteristics of honesty do not mean that individuals are free to set their own standards of honesty in particular circumstances. The standard of what constitutes honest conduct is not subjective. Honesty is not an optional scale, with higher or lower values according to the moral standards of each individual. If a person knowingly appropriates another’s property, he will not escape a finding of dishonesty simply because he sees nothing wrong in such behaviour.

Hence, the conduct of the defendant is to be assessed according to an objective standard of dishonesty in light of the actual knowledge of the defendant. When undertaking such exercise, the court will also have regard to personal attributes of the defendant, such as his experience and intelligence, and the reason why he acted as he did. His Lordship then gave a few examples of dishonesty, such as deception, knowingly taking the property of others, participation in a transaction in light of knowledge that it involves a misapplication of trust assets, willful blindness etc.

The issue was later reconsidered in Twinsectra Ltd v Yardley in the House of Lords, which unfortunately returned a different answer. The majority in that case held that Lord Nicholls in Royal Brunei meant to say that, for a person to be held liable as an accessory to a breach of trust, he had to have acted dishonestly by the ordinary standards of reasonable and honest people and have been himself aware that by those standards he was acting dishonestly. This became known as the "combined test", namely a standard which requires both subjective and objective states of mind. Lord Hutton's reason for adopting the combined test is that a finding by a judge that a defendant has been dishonest is a grave finding, and it is particularly grave against a professional man. Therefore, in his view, a higher level of blameworthiness is required to impose liability in dishonest assistance.

Lord Millett delivered a dissenting judgment, maintaining that Royal Brunei decided that the test of dishonesty is objective, although account must be taken of subjective considerations such as the defendant's experience and intelligence and his actual state of knowledge at the relevant time. But it is not necessary that he should actually have appreciated that he was acting dishonestly; it is sufficient that he was. The question is whether an honest person would appreciate that what he was doing was wrong or improper, not whether the defendant himself actually appreciated this. His Lordship gave 3 reasons for this:

1. Consciousness of wrongdoing is an aspect of mens rea and an appropriate condition of criminal liability: it is not an appropriate condition of civil liability.
2. The objective test is in accordance with Barnes v Addy and the traditional doctrine.
3. The claim for “knowing assistance” is the equitable counterpart of the economic torts. These are intentional torts; negligence is not sufficient and dishonesty is not necessary. Liability depends on knowledge. A requirement of subjective dishonesty introduces an unnecessary and unjustified distinction between the elements of the equitable claim and those of the tort of wrongful interference with the performance of a contract.

What Lord Hutton said in Twinsectra has now been reinterpreted and restated by the Privy Council in Barlow Clowes International v Eurotrust International. In that case, Lord Hoffmann reaffirmed the objective test, i.e. the one maintained by Lord Millett in Twinsectra, as the correct test for dishonesty. His Lordship interpreted Lord Hutton's reference to 'what he knows would offend normally acceptable standards of honest conduct' as meaning only that his knowledge of the transaction had to be such as to render his participation contrary to normally acceptable standards of honest conduct. His Lordship said that it is not necessary for the defendant to have reflections what those normally acceptable standards of honest conduct were.

Subsequently, the lower English courts have adopted the test laid down in Barlow Clowes, although theoretically it is not open to them to refuse to follow the House of Lords decision in Twinsectra. In Abou-Rahmah v Abacha before the English Court of Appeal, Arden LJ endorsed Barlow Clowes as representing the current English law for 4 reasons:

1. Barlow Clowes did not require a departure from Twinsectra, but merely give guidance as to the proper interpretation to be given to Twinsectra as a matter of English law.
2. Barlow Clowes drew no distinction between the law of Isle of Man and English law
3. Members of the Privy Council in Barlow Clowes were all members of the House of Lords, and included 2 members of the majority from Twinsectra. The House of Lords is unlikely to come to a different view as to the proper interpretation of Twinsectra.
4. There are no overriding reasons why in the context of civil liability (as opposed to criminal liability) the law should take account of the defendant's subjective views of the morality of his actions.

However, the other two judges, Pill LJ and Rix LJ, refused to get drawn into the controversy as it was unnecessary to decide on the proper test for dishonesty to dispose of the appeal. In fact, some commentators have suggested that Pill LJ seems to support the combined test in Twinsectra, although he did not make it explicit.

In AG of Zambia v Meer Care & Desai, Peter Smith J at the Chancery Division opined that the question of objective/subjective test is an over elaboration and endorsed the test set out in Royal Brunei, which he regards as another way of posing the jury question "was the defendant dishonest". He disagreed with Lord Hutton's view in Twinsectra that Lord Millett was articulating a purely objective test. He also regarded Lord Hutton's justification for the combined test, that dishonesty is a grave finding against professionals, as erroneous since it is no less grave for a non professional to be accused of dishonesty and there had been plenty of dishonest professionals.

The test in Royal Brunei and Barlow Clowes has been accepted as the law in New Zealand in the New Zealand Court of Appeal case US International Marketing Ltd v National Bank of NZ Ltd. However, one of the three judges (Tipping J) applied a reasonable person test as opposed to the honest person test in determining the question of dishonesty.

==== What knowledge constitutes dishonesty ====
In Agip (Africa) Ltd v Jackson and Twinsectra v Yardley, Lord Millett remarked that it is not necessary that the dishonest assistant should be aware of the identity of the victim or nature of the breach and knowledge that the money is not at the free disposal of the assisted person suffices to impose liability. Similarly, in Barlow Clowes, Lord Hoffmann said it is unnecessary for the dishonest assistant to know of the existence of breach or the facts; it is enough if he /she knows or suspects he is assisting in misappropriation of money without knowing money is held on trust.

What level of suspicion suffice to trigger the liability continues to trouble the courts. In Abou-Rahmah, Arden LJ opined that the dishonest assistant is not dishonest if he only has general suspicions about impropriety as opposed to particular suspicions regarding specific transactions. However, Rix LJ thought otherwise and said that general suspicion is enough to trigger the liability.

== Relationship with knowing receipt ==
Traditionally, dishonest assistance and knowing receipt are seen as two distinct heads of liability: one is fault based, while the other is receipt based. However, there has been academic discussion as to whether they can be grouped together. Charles Mitchell proposes that if we adopt Peter Birk's view regarding knowing receipt (that knowing receipt can be based on unjust enrichment as well as fault), there is a strong case for treating liability for dishonest assistance and fault-based knowing receipt as aspects of a single equitable wrong of interfering with another's equitable rights – a wrong he called “equitable conversion”. Furthermore, Lord Nicholls has proposed extrajudicially that dishonesty is one of the bases for the liability for knowing receipt and that dishonest receipt can be grouped with dishonest assistance into dishonest participation in breach of trust.

== See also ==
- English trusts law
