= Protected tenancy =

Type of tenancy in the United Kingdom

A protected tenancy is a kind of tenancy in England and Wales under the Rent Act 1977, which governs the law concerning regulated tenancies. Protected tenancies give a tenant both security of tenure and the right to a fair rent. Protected tenancies are relatively rare since the passage of the Housing Act 1988 but protected tenancies that existed prior to the passage of this law continue to enjoy the greater security.

A protected tenancy is an ordinary contractual tenancy that protects the tenant's possession while it is in operation. If a protected tenancy comes to an end and the tenant remains in occupation of the property then a statutory tenancy is created. Due to the passage of the Housing Act 1988 contractual tenancies entered into after 16 January 1989 cannot be protected tenancies subject to exceptions outlined in section 34 of the Act.

There were formerly two types of protected tenancies called controlled and regulated tenancies but all controlled tenancies have now been converted into regulated tenancies.

== See also ==
- Converted tenancy
