= Barnes v Addy =

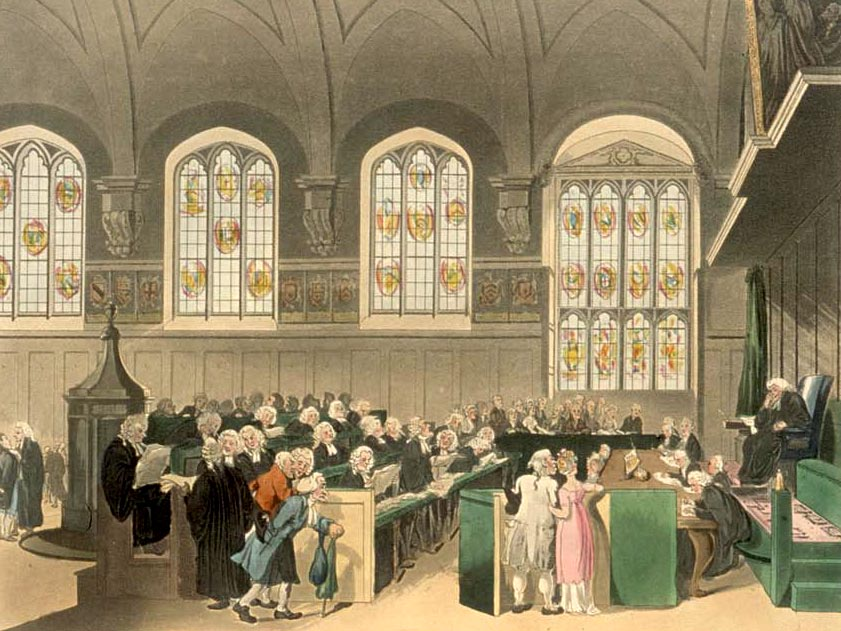
- Court: Court of Appeal in Chancery
- Decided: 12 February 1874
- Citation: (1870) B 92; (1874) LR 9 Ch App 244

Court membership
- Judges sitting: Lord Selborne LC, Sir W M James LJ, Sir G Mellish LJ

Case opinions
- Lord Selborne LC

Keywords
- Breach of trust, accessory liability, knowing receipt, knowing assistance

Barnes v Addy (1874) LR 9 Ch App 244 was a decision of the Court of Appeal in Chancery. It established that, in English trusts law, third parties could be liable for a breach of trust in two circumstances, referred to as the two 'limbs' of Barnes v Addy: knowing receipt and knowing assistance.

Although the decision remains historically significant in common law countries, the House of Lords significantly revised the relevant equitable principles in cases such as Royal Brunei Airlines v Tan (1995) and Dubai Aluminium Co Ltd v Salaam (2002).

== Statement of principle ==
In Royal Brunei Airlines v Tan, the House of Lords described this passage as the "much-quoted dictum" in Barnes v Addy:

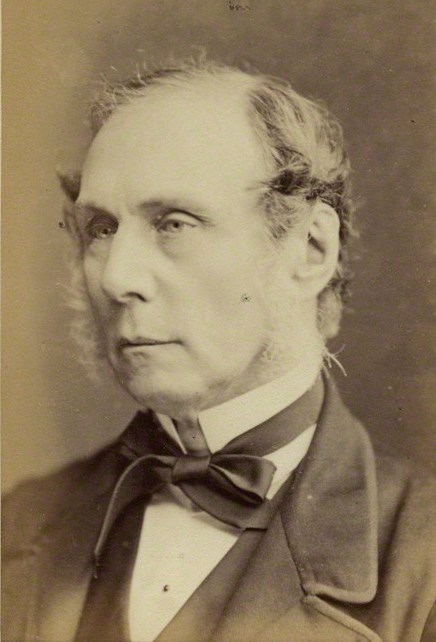
The leading judgment was given by Lord Selborne LC.

[The responsibility of a trustee] may no doubt be extended in equity to others who are not properly trustees, if they are found ... actually participating in any fraudulent conduct of the trustee to the injury of the cestui que trust. But ... strangers are not to be made constructive trustees merely because they act as the agents of trustees in transactions within their legal powers, transactions, perhaps of which a court of equity may disapprove, unless those agents receive and become chargeable with some part of the trust property, or unless they assist with knowledge in a dishonest and fraudulent design on the part of the trustees.

— Lord Selborne LC, Barnes v Addy (1874) LR 9 Ch App 244, 251–252.

This passage was adopted by the High Court of Australia as a statement of the 'rule in Barnes v Addy' in Farah Constructions Pty Ltd v Say-Dee Pty Ltd (2007).

== Facts ==
Henry Barnes appointed William Crush, John Lugar and John Addy to be testators and executors of his will. His money would be invested and then used as a £100 annuity for his widow, Ann, and his three daughters and son. John Addy, the sole remaining trustee, appointed another trustee, with an indemnity. Addy’s solicitors, including Mr William Duffield, had advised against appointing a sole trustee, but drew up the deeds of appointment and indemnity, introduced him to a stockbroker, and the broker transferred the trustee money. This trustee misapplied the trust property and became bankrupt. The children sued Addy and the solicitors.

At first instance, Wickens VC held the solicitors were not liable for the trustee's breach.

== Judgment ==
Lord Selborne LC held that neither of the solicitors had any knowledge of or reason to suspect dishonesty in the transaction.

We cannot consistently with the evidence, or with justice, or reason, disbelieve Mr. Duffield, when he says he never knew nor suspected any dishonest purpose, or believed that any actual fraud would result from what was done; and if that be a true interpretation of the facts, I certainly, for one, am unable to hold him responsible. With respect to the receipt of the money, he received nothing except two sums, one which belonged to the Barlow family, and on which nothing turns, and the other a part ... of which a third came from the Barnes' share, representing £65; and it is said he is to be charged with that (though he did not retain or use for his own benefit a single shilling of that money) because the authority of the trustees to apply that money in the payment of certain costs of a previous suit, which had been compromised, was not obtained from this Court ...

— Lord Selborne LC, Barnes v Addy (1874) LR 9 Ch App 244, 254.

In any event, Barnes had not established a breach of trust by Addy:

The trustee, Addy, authorized the sale for [the] purpose [of compromising a suit brought against him as trustee] and that application of the money, and it was so applied; and I am most clearly of opinion, first of all, that there is nothing before us to shew that such an application was improper on the part of Mr. Addy, the trustee; but, secondly, that if it had been, the solicitor could not possibly have been held on that account responsible.

— Lord Selborne LC, Barnes v Addy (1874) LR 9 Ch App 244, 255.

Sir W M James LJ and Sir G Mellish LJ agreed.

== Continuing significance ==
Barnes v Addy was the starting point for the academic debate as to the proper grounds of accessory liability and claims for knowing receipt of trust property. Lord Nicholls revised the test for assistance liability in Royal Brunei Airlines v Tan (1995), whereby it is no longer necessary for the trustee to have acted dishonestly and instead the key element is that the third party acted dishonestly. This change was deemed necessary on the facts of Royal Brunei as the defendant was a sole director of a company who had caused the dishonest misapplication of trust property, but it had been held that the director's mental state would not be imputed to the company which had held the proceeds under trust. Writing extra-judicially, Lord Nicholls has also argued that the receipt limb of liability for third parties is based on unjust enrichment, a proposition which was decisively rejected by the High Court of Australia in Farah Constructions Pty Ltd v Say-Dee Pty Ltd.

== See also ==
- Equity (law)
- Fiduciary
