= Converted tenancy =

A converted tenancy is in English property law a type of tenancy that existed where a controlled tenancy was converted into a regulated tenancy. From 28 November 1980 all controlled tenancies were converted into regulated tenancies.
