= Brinks Ltd v Abu-Saleh (No 3) =

- Court: High Court
- Citation: [1996] CLC 133

Keywords
- Breach of trust, dishonest assistance

Brinks Ltd v Abu-Saleh (No 3) [1996] CLC 133 is an English trusts law case, concerning breach of trust and liability for dishonest assistance. It established an apparently high threshold for liability for dishonest assistance.

== Facts ==
Mrs Elcombe’s husband, Mr Elcombe, laundered the proceeds of a gold bullion theft, by driving to Switzerland with cash hidden in the car, sometimes with her there with him. She thought her husband was probably avoiding taxes but did not realize that she was assisting in a breach of trust. Brinks Ltd argued that she had dishonestly assisted in the breach of trust.

== Judgment ==
Rimer J held that Mrs Elcombe had not assisted her husband, because her accompaniment was merely ‘in the capacity’ as his wife rather than providing cover for money laundering. She may have made it a more pleasant experience but it was not ‘assistance of a nature sufficient to make her an accessory to the breach of trust.’ It was not enough to be dishonest about one thing if that was not the thing being done.

== Significance ==
Lord Hoffmann cast some doubt on the decision Barlow Clowes Ltd v Eurotrust Ltd by saying that one cannot be dishonest about a thing which one thinks one is not doing.

== See also ==
- English trusts law
