= Ghaidan v Godin-Mendoza =

2004 UK House of Lords case

- Court: House of Lords
- Full case name: Ghaidan (Appellant) v. Godin-Mendoza (FC) (Respondent)
- Decided: 4 June 2004
- Citations: [2004] UKHL 30 [2004] 2 AC 557 [2004] 3 WLR 113 [2004] 3 All ER 411 [2004] 27 EGCS 128 [2004] UKHRR 827; 16 BHRC 671 [2004] 2 FLR 600 [2004] NPC 100 [2004] 2 FCR 481 [2004] 2 P & CR DG17 [2004] Fam Law 641
- Transcript: HoL judgement

Case history
- Appealed from: [2001] EWCA Civ 1533

Case opinions
- Decision by: Nicholls
- Concurrence: Steyn, Roger, Hale
- Dissent: Millett

Ghaidan v Godin-Mendoza is an important case in human rights law in England and Wales due to its interpretation of primary legislation under section 3 of the Human Rights Act 1998. It was also considered an important family law case. The final appeal of the case was heard on 21 June 2004 and established that the definition of "spouse" in the Rent Act 1977 had to be interpreted to include couples in same-sex relationships in order to comply with Article 8 of the European Convention on Human Rights. The case is notable because the judges overturned their own earlier decision in Fitzpatrick v Sterling Housing Association Ltd, a near identical case where there was no human rights implication.

== Background ==
Juan Godin-Mendoza had shared a flat with his partner Hugh Wallwyn-James since 1983. The flat was held by Wallwyn-James under a statutory tenancy which, under the terms of the Rent Act, would pass automatically to a spouse or partner in the event of his death. Following Wallwyn-James's death in 2001, the landlord, Ahmad Ghaidan, claimed possession of the flat.

== Legal case ==
The case was first heard at the County Court where the judge held that a same-sex relationship did not meet the definition of a spousal relationship and granted possession of the flat to the landlord. At the Court of Appeal it was held that the Human Rights Act 1998 required the court to interpret the Rent Act in such a way as to make it compatible with the Human Rights Act and the European Convention on Human Rights. Referencing Article 14 of the European Convention on Human Rights the court determined that Godin-Mendoza was being discriminated against in comparison to a heterosexual couple and, as such, the Rent Act definition of "spouse" should be interpreted to apply also to same-sex couples.

The landlord was granted leave to appeal to the House of Lords.The appeal was heard by Lord Nicholls of Birkenhead, Lord Steyn, Lord Millett, Lord Rodger of Earlsferry and Baroness Hale of Richmond who confirmed the decision of the Court of Appeal.

The case established the precedent that section 3 of the Human Rights Act allows the court to "read in words" that change the meaning of primary legislation to make it compatible as long it is "compatible with the underlying thrust of the legislation being construed."
