= Muschinski v Dodds =

Judgement of the High Court of Australia

- Court: High Court of Australia
- Decided: 6 December 1985
- Citations: [1985] HCA 78, (1985) 160 CLR 583

Case history
- Prior action: (1982) 8 Fam LR 622
- Appealed from: NSW Court of Appeal

Case opinions
- Majority: Gibbs CJ, Mason & Deane JJ
- Dissent: Brennan & Dawson JJ

Muschinski v Dodds, was a significant Australian court case, decided by the High Court of Australia on 6 December 1985. The case was part of a trend of High Court decisions to impose a constructive trust where it would be unconscionable for a legal owner of property to deny the beneficial interests of another. In this case the Court held it would be unconscionable for Mr Dodds to retain a half share of the property without first accounting for the purchase price paid by Ms Muschinski.

== Background ==
=== Facts ===
Ms Muschinski and Mr Dodds were in a de facto relationship. In 1976 they purchased a property in Picton as tenants in common, intending to develop and use the property. Ms Muschinski paid the purchase price while Mr Dodds was going to renovate the cottage and to pay for a kit house. The development did not go ahead and the couple separated.

=== Prior actions ===
Ms Muschinski commenced proceedings in the Supreme Court of NSW seeking a declaration that she was the sole owner. Mr Dodds made a cross claim for the property to be sold and the proceeds to be divided equally. Waddell J dismissed Ms Muschinski's claim and stood the matter over to determine Mr Dodds' cross claim. Ms Muschinski appealed to the NSW Court of Appeal who dismissed the appeal. Hope JA, with whom Samuels and Mahoney JJA agreed, said:

I agree with his Honour's conclusion that (Ms Muschinski) intended to give (Mr Dodds) a one-half beneficial interest in the land, and that this intention was based on the assurances which (Mr Dodds) gave to her and not upon the fulfilment of those assurances.

== Judgment ==
The High Court of Australia found in favour of Ms Muschinski. The majority, Gibbs CJ, Mason & Deane JJ, held that the legal interests of the parties were subject to a constructive trust to (1) repayment any joint debts (2) repay each of their contributions and (3) any residue was to be distributed in equal shares.

Brennan & Dawson JJ dissented.

== See also ==
=== Cases Referring to this Case ===
- Baumgartner v Baumgartner.
- Farah Constructions Pty Ltd v Say-Dee Pty Ltd.

=== Cases Considered by this Case ===
- Commercial Bank of Australia Ltd v Amadio.
