= Duke's Lodge =

Coordinates: 51.50688°N 0.20357°W

Duke's Lodge was a six-storey neo-Georgian 1930s apartment building on 0.6 acres at 80 Holland Park, London W11. The 35,550 sq ft building comprised 27 apartments.

It was built from 1937 to 1939, designed by the architect W. J. Kieffer, and occupied from 1942. In 1955, a roof extension with two apartments was added.

The building was owned by Liverpool Victoria (LV), who paid each of 12 long-term residents an average of £1 million to buy out their protected tenancy rights, so that all residents would be shorthold tenants who could be evicted at short notice.

As it is not a listed building, meaning there were "few barriers to redevelopment and even demolition", and "the bidding war was aggressive".

In 2013, an offshore Guernsey-based subsidiary of Christian Candy's CPC Group bought Duke's Lodge, for an estimated £50 million, making it "the capital's most expensive apartment block".

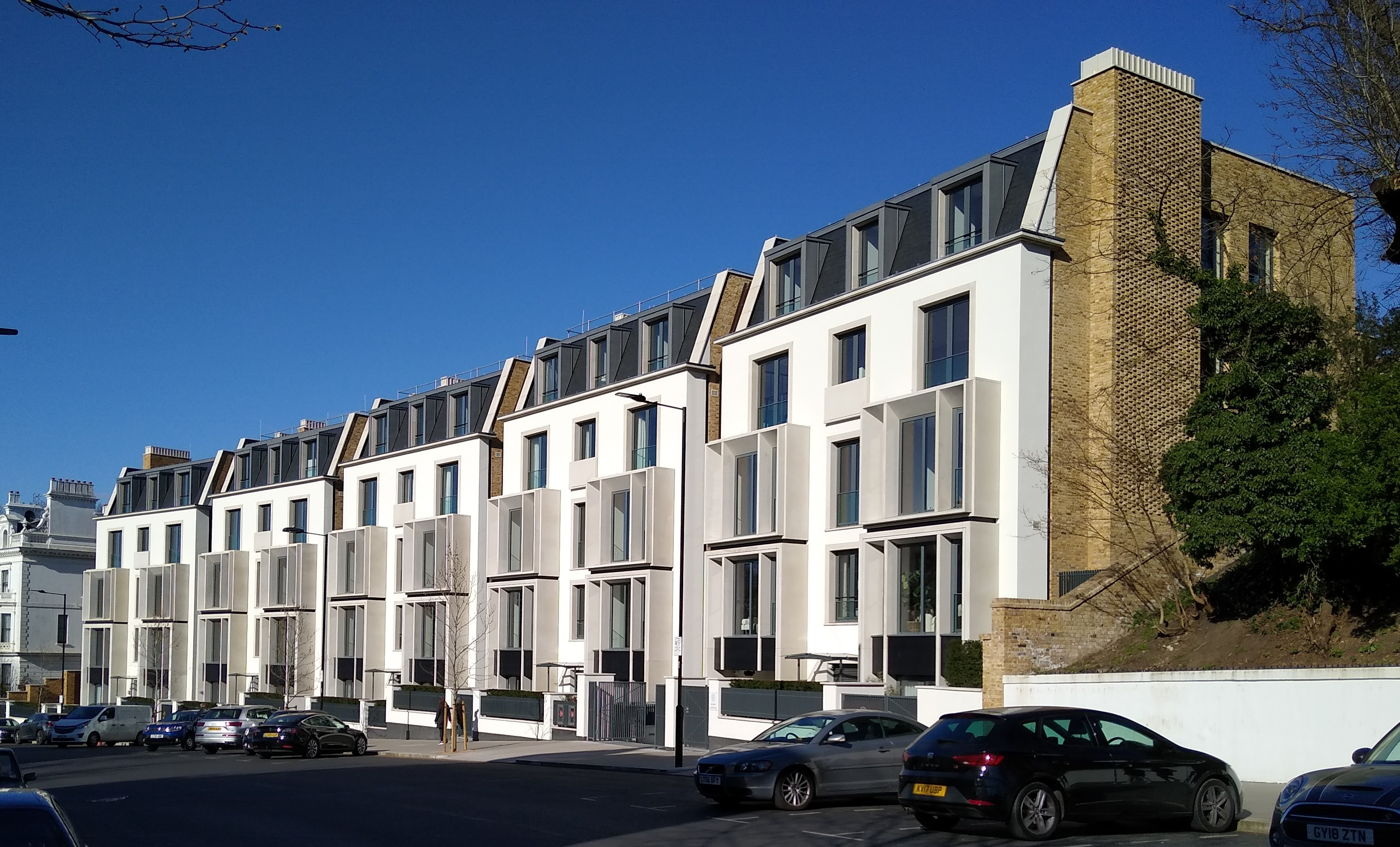
The complex at 80 Holland Park in April 2021

In March 2017, it was reported that CPC Group had received planning permission, on appeal, to demolish the building and replace it with five interconnected stuccoed "villas" divided into 24 flats, plus a two-storey basement.
