= El Ajou v Dollar Land Holdings plc =

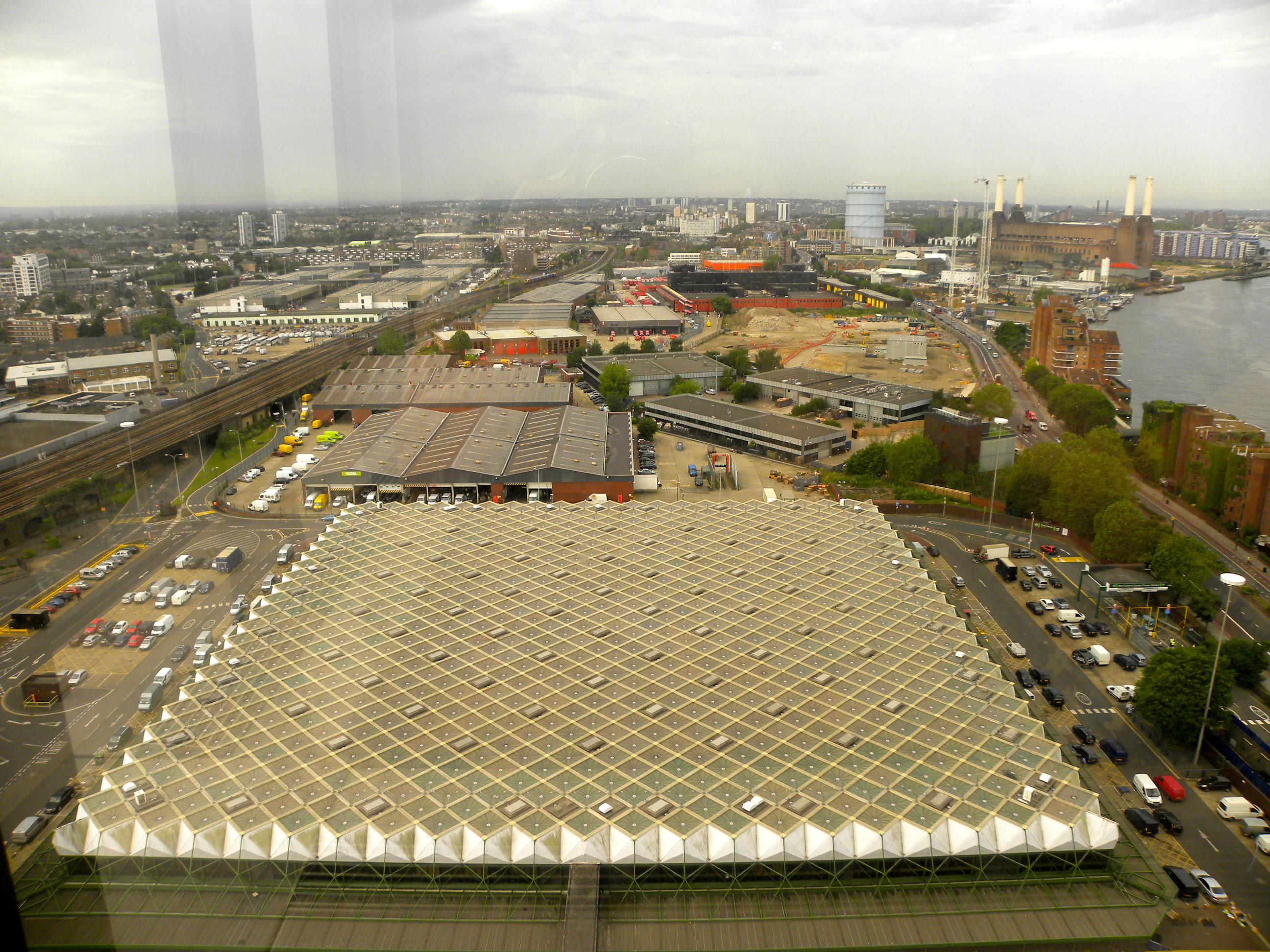
- Nine Elms, Battersea (where some of the laundered proceeds ended up)
- Court: Court of Appeal
- Full case name: Abdul Ghani el Ajou v (1) Dollar Land Holdings Limited, and (2) Factorum NV
- Decided: 2 December 1993
- Citations: [1993] EWCA Civ 4 [1994] 2 All ER 685 [1994] BCC 143

Case history
- Prior action: [1993] 3 All ER 717
- Subsequent action: El Ajou v Dollar Land Holdings plc (No 2) [1995] 2 All ER 213

Court membership
- Judges sitting: Nourse LJ, Rose LJ, Hoffman LJ

Keywords
- Constructive trust; Knowing receipt; Tracing; Attribution of knowledge

El Ajou v Dollar Land Holdings plc [1993] EWCA Civ 4 is an English trust law case concerning tracing and receipt of property in breach of trust.

Although the Court of Appeal overturned the first instance decision on appeal, the first instance decision is much more widely cited. The decision was reversed relating to the issues around knowing receipt, and there was no substantive appeal against the trial judge's original rulings in relation to the law of tracing, and those statements all remain good law. In the 34th edition of Snell's Equity, the judgment of Millett J at trial is cited eleven times, but the Court of Appeal's decision is not cited at all.

== Facts ==
The facts were set out in the judgment.

Abdul Ghani El Ajou was a wealthy businessman who resided in Saudi Arabia. He was the largest single victim, although not the only victim, of a massive share fraud scheme carried out in Amsterdam between 1984 and 1985 by three Canadians. The proceeds of that fraud were transferred around the world through various intermediaries, until they arrived in London, where in 1986 they were invested in a joint venture to carry out a property development project at Nine Elms in Battersea as part of a joint venture with a company called Dollar Land Holdings PLC (referred to as "DLH" in the judgments). DLH was a public limited company incorporated in England but was tax resident in Switzerland.

The interest of the Canadians in the joint venture was subsequently bought out by DLH in 1988, which then became the sole owner of the development project. When the nature of fraud was uncovered and the proceeds were tracked by the plaintiffs lawyers into the development project, he began legal proceedings to try and reclaim some of the money he had been defrauded of. For their part, DLH denied that in 1986 it had had any knowledge that the money which the Canadians invested in the project represented the proceeds of fraud. They further asserted that, in buying out the interest of the Canadians in 1988 they were a bona fide purchaser for value without notice of the fraud.

== Judgment ==
=== High Court ===
At first instance Millett J gave a lengthy judgment which had to deal with a broad array of legal issues, including tracing, dishonest assistance and knowing receipt. He held that:

1. it was not possible to trace the stolen money at common law because it had become mixed with the money of the fraudsters and other victims;
2. however, it was possible to trace the money in equity, because the fraudsters stood in fiduciary relationship with the plaintiff as constructive trustees (citing his own decision in Agip (Africa) Ltd v Jackson [1991] Ch 547 on this point);
3. this type of constructive trust was not a remedial constructive trust, but an institutional resulting trust;
4. the plaintiff could therefore trace the money all the way into the hands of DLH;
5. the fact that the money passed through countries which did not recognise the concept of trusts/equitable ownership did not defeat the equitable tracing claim;
6. in order to succeed against DLH the plaintiff had to show that DLH had the requisite degree of knowledge that the money was proceeds of fraud; and
7. he held there was no evidence that the principals of DLH knew the Canadians were using fraudulently obtained money, and so DLH could not be take to have that knowledge.

Accordingly, he found for the defendants. In his judgment he assumed that negligence rather than dishonesty, triggered liability in equity for knowing receipt.

That decision was appealed by the plaintiff, and there was also a cross appeal by the defendant on one issue relating to tracing.

=== Court of Appeal ===
Court of Appeal overturned Millett J on the finding that the recipient company had sufficient knowledge, adopting another analysis of the facts.

Lord Justice Nourse commenced his judgment:

Of the questions that remain in dispute in this case, the most important is whether, for the purposes of establishing a company's liability under the knowing receipt head of constructive trust, the knowledge of one of its directors can be treated as having been the knowledge of the company.

Lord Justice Hoffman commenced his judgment:

[T]he plaintiff must show, first, a disposal of his assets in breach of fiduciary duty; secondly, the beneficial receipt by the defendant of assets which are traceable as representing the assets of the plaintiff; and thirdly, knowledge on the part of the defendant that the assets he received are traceable to a breach of fiduciary duty.

== Subsequent hearing ==
The case was then remitted back to the High Court for determination of damages, and a second judgment is reported at El Ajou v Dollar Land Holdings plc (No 2) [1995] 2 All ER 213. The principle issue in the judgment (of Robert Walker J) was whether the plaintiff could claim the entire sum remaining in the hands of DLH, or only a rateable proportion (the other share belonging in equity to the other victims of the fraud). The court held that as none of the other victims had come forward, the plaintiff could claim the entire sum (up to the maximum amount of his total loss). The case also set down important guidance for the assessment of interest in claims relating to fraud.

== See also ==
- English trust law
- Constructive trusts in English law
- Tracing in English law
