= Barlow Clowes International Ltd v Eurotrust International Ltd =

- Court: Judicial Committee of the Privy Council
- Citations: [2005] UKPC 37, [2006] 1 All ER 333

Case history
- Prior action: Staff of Government Division of the High Court of Justice of the Isle of Man

Keywords
- Breach of trust, dishonest assistance

Barlow Clowes International Ltd v Eurotrust International Ltd [2005] UKPC 37 is an English trusts law case, concerning breach of trust and liability for dishonest assistance.

== Facts ==
Barlow Clowes International Ltd was in liquidation, after its fraudulent securities scheme was exposed. It took £140m of investors’ money, and paid it into an Isle of Man company where Mr Henwood was a director. The liquidator of Barlow Clowes argued that Mr Henwood had dishonestly assisted the dissipation of the investors’ money.

The deemster (judge on the Isle of Man) held that Mr Henwood was dishonest. The Court of Appeal held that Mr Henwood was not dishonest, and there was no evidence by which the deemster could have found this. Her disbelief at Mr Henwood’s oral testimony and her inferences were not enough.

== Advice ==
Lord Hoffmann held Mr Henwood was liable, and the deemster had correctly applied the principles of liability for dishonest assistance. She had stated that Mr Henwood suspected the funds were misappropriated money, and (disapproving Brinks Ltd v Abu-Saleh (No 3) [1996] CLC 133) a person could know and suspect money was being misappropriated and thus be liable without knowing the money was held on trust or even knowing what a trust meant. The findings of fact could be made legitimately. With later transactions he had been informed that the director of Barlow Clowes was misappropriating clients’ money, and no inquiries were made. He held there was an element of ambiguity in Lord Hutton’s decision in Twinsectra Ltd v Yardley. When it was said that ‘what he knows would offend normally accepted standards of honest conduct’ means that what he knows was in objective fact dishonest.

10. Such a state of mind may consist in knowledge that the transaction is one in which he cannot honestly participate (for example, a misappropriation of other people's money), or it may consist in suspicion combined with a conscious decision not to make inquiries which might result in knowledge. Although a dishonest state of mind is a subjective mental state, the standard by which the law determines whether it is dishonest is objective. If by ordinary standards a defendant’s mental state would be characterised as dishonest, it is irrelevant that the defendant judges by different standards.’

[...]

15. Their Lordships accept that there is an element of ambiguity in these remarks which may have encouraged a belief, expressed in some academic writing, that Twinsectra had departed from the law as previously understood and invited inquiry not merely into the defendant’s mental state about the nature of the transaction in which he was participating but also into his views about generally acceptable standards of honesty. But they do not consider that this is what Lord Hutton meant. The reference to “what he knows would offend normally accepted standards of honest conduct” meant only that his knowledge of the transaction had to be such as to render his participation contrary to normally acceptable standards of honest conduct. It did not require that he should have had reflections about what those normally acceptable standards were.

Lord Nicholls, Lord Steyn gave concurring judgments.

Lord Walker and Lord Carswell concurred.

== See also ==
- English trusts law
