= Knowing receipt =

English trusts law doctrine

Knowing receipt is an English trusts law doctrine for imposing liability on a person who has received property that belongs to a trust, or which was held by a fiduciary, having known that the property was given to them in breach of trust. To be liable for knowing receipt, the claimant must show, first, a disposal of his trust assets in breach of fiduciary duty; second, the beneficial receipt by the defendant of assets which are traceable as representing the assets of the claimant; and third, knowledge on the part of the defendant that the assets he received are traceable to a breach of fiduciary duty.

"Knowing receipt" is also sometimes called "unconscionable receipt" because of its theoretical foundation in the doctrine of unconscionability. The contrary view is that knowing receipt is, or ought to be, part of a broader doctrine of ignorance triggering a claim for unjust enrichment. On this view, anyone who receives property that was given away in breach of trust has a strict duty to repay the value, unless they have committed a wrong, or have changed their position after the receipt. This model suggests that knowledge is not exclusively relevant for liability.

The underlying principle of knowing receipt is beneficial receipt of D is unjust enrichment at the expense of the rightful owner. In Royal Brunei Airlines Sdn Bhd v Tan, knowing receipt is characterized as restitution-based liability (as opposed to accessory liability).

== Degree of knowledge required ==
Under knowing receipt, the onus is on the claimant beneficiary to establish recipient's knowledge. The degree of knowledge required has been a controversial issue and there are numerous lines of authority on it. For example, in some cases it was held that Baden category 1 to 3 knowledge, i.e. dishonesty is needed, or in some cases it was held that all 5 categories would suffice, i.e. either dishonesty or negligence.

In Belmont Finance Corp Ltd v Williams Furniture (No 2) it was held that fraud and dishonesty was not required, i.e. negligence would suffice. In El Ajou v Dollar Land Holdings plc it was held that constructive knowledge was sufficient; Though in Polly Peck International Plc v Nadir (Asil) (No.2) [1992], Scott LJ agreed that courts are always reluctant to extend constructive notice doctrine to circumstances when money is paid in the ordinary course of business.

At last, in BCCI (Overseas) Ltd v Akindele it was held that the degree of knowledge for knowing receipt is knowledge that makes it unconscionable for recipient to retain benefit of receipt. It was also held that the five categories of knowledge in Baden is not useful.

== Proprietary base ==
The Court of Appeal confirmed in Byers v Saudi National Bank [2022] EWCA Civ 43 that in order to sustain a claim in knowing receipt against a third party, then the claimants must have had a beneficial interest in the property at some point when it was in the defendant's hands and they had knowledge of the breach of trust. If the claimant's beneficial interest in the property is extinguished by the transfer, then no claim can be maintained in knowing receipt.

== See also ==
- English trusts law
- Dishonest assistance
