= Mortgages in English law =

Mortgages in English law are a method of raising capital through a loan contract. Typically with a bank, the lender/mortgagee gives money to the borrower/mortgagor, who uses their property/land/home as security (essentially a reassurance) that they will repay the debt and any relevant interest. If the mortgagor fails to repay, then the mortgaged property which has been used as security may be subject to various mortgagee remedies allowing them to retrieve the debt. Mortgages are an important part of English land law and property law. These concern, first, the common law, statutory and regulatory rules to protect the mortgagor (i.e. the borrower) at the time of concluding the mortgage agreement. Second, English law defines and restricts the process for taking possession of property in the event of default. Third, it places duties on mortgagees (i.e. lenders, like banks) on the price it achieves when selling property.

Although most of the law relating to mortgages relates to mortgages of land, it is possible to mortgage almost any type of property. Mortgages over personal property are often referred to as 'chattel mortgages', and mortgages over intangible rights are often expressed to operate by way of assignment. Separate statutory regimes also exist in relation to mortgages of ships under the Merchant Shipping Act 1995 and mortgages of aircraft and related parts under the Cape Town Convention.

Technically the term "mortgage" refers to the security interest in the collateral, but in commercial parlance the term is often used inclusively as a reference to the entire secured lending arrangement.

The law of mortgages is notoriously complex. In a 1986 working paper relating to land mortgages, the Law Commission commenced thus:

"The English law of land mortgages is notoriously difficult. It has never been subjected to systematic statutory reform, and over centuries of gradual evolution it has acquired a multi-layered structure that is historically fascinating but inappropriately and sometimes unnecessarily complicated."

Slightly more pithily, Lord Macnaghten once commented in a judgment: "no one, I am sure, by the light of nature ever understood an English mortgage of real estate."

== History ==
Like many aspects of English law, the law relating to mortgages is closely tied up with its historical development. Mortgages have existed in English law since the 12th century, but early English mortgages were largely shaped by usury laws. At the time charging interest was both against the law, and a sin. Accordingly, upon the grant of a mortgage, the mortgagee would come into possession of the land - if the income arising from the land paid down the mortgage debt it was referred to as a live pledge (or vivum vaidum) but if the mortgagee simply took those proceeds and the debt was unchanged it was called a dead pledge (originally a mortuum vadium, which later was replaced by the Norman French, morte gage which eventually became mortgage).

By the 1400s the form of mortgages had changed somewhat - mortgages were still created by transferring ownership of the land to the mortgagee, but the mortgagor remained in possession to work the land. However, on the stated day for redemption the mortgagor had to pay the full amount of the debt, otherwise they would lose their right to redeem and the land would belong to the mortgagee absolutely. This was doubly draconian as not only did the mortgagor lose their land, but the debt remained and still had to be repaid. However, as the law became less restrictive in relation to the charging of interest due to the passage of successive Usury Acts, and as society's attitudes changed, mortgages became more widely used, and the courts of Chancery became increasingly interested in protecting people from the severity of the common law rules relating to redemption.

By developing a series of equitable doctrines the Courts of Chancery increasingly gave greater protection to mortgagors. They held that a mortgagee in possession had to account for all rents received on the property, and provide a degree of protection where the mortgagor was late in repaying the loan. In effect the Courts of Chancery "transformed mortgages from instruments of extortion to a convenient and flexible instrument of commerce."

Even though the effect of a mortgage was to transfer legal title to the mortgagee, the Courts of Chancery recognised that the mortgagor had a separate species of property right in equity, which came to be known as the "equity of redemption". Similar to this, a separate but confusingly similarly named right existed, which was the equitable right to redeem.

In relation to land, the next great reforms were under the Law of Property Act 1925 which restricted mortgages to two types: a mortgage by demise (as to which, see below) and a mortgage by statutory charge. With the passage of time the mortgage by demise has become almost completely obsolete, and today almost all mortgages of land in England and Wales are by way of statutory charge.

Mortgages have also existed in relation to personal property (as opposed to land) for a considerable period of time, although for much of English legal history security over personal property was usually executed by way of pledge rather than by way of mortgage. However, by the Victorian era mortgages of personal property were sufficiently widespread that the legislature enacted the Bills of Sale Acts to try and regulate this area of the law. Mortgages of ships have been regulated by statute since at least 1894, and clearly existed for some time before that.

== Creation of a mortgage ==
While real property may be divided among co-owners and tenants for the purpose of the land's use and enjoyment, taking a mortgage of property primarily serves the purpose of ensuring loans are repaid. Because of the nature of money lending, and frequently unequal bargaining power between banks and borrowers, the law gives significant legal protection to borrowers against the enforcement of unfair bargains. Along with pledges, liens and equitable charges, English law counts a mortgage as one of four main kinds of security interest, whereby a proprietary right that binds third parties is said to arise on conclusion of a contract. It must simply be the contract's intention to make property available to secure repayment. The Law of Property Act 1925 section 85 say that a mortgage requires a deed (under LPMPA 1989 section 1, a document that is signed, witnessed and states it is a deed). Under the Land Registration Act 2002 sections 23 and 27, a notice of a mortgage must be filed with HM Land Registry for the mortgage to be effective. Then, Law of Property Act 1925, section 87 says mortgages confer upon the mortgagee (i.e. the secured lender) the same rights as a 3000-year lease holder.

== Protection of borrowers ==
=== Equity of redemption ===
The reason for this reference to "3000 years" is that in a primitive protective measure, the common law said mortgage terms must always allow for the property to be redeemed in the end, when the debt is repaid. In the 18th century decision of Vernon v Bethell Lord Henley LC refused to enforce the conveyance of Vernon's sugar plantation in Antigua to a deceased London lender, Bethell, when Vernon had trouble repaying, even though some exchanges between the two had raised the possibility of giving up the land to satisfy the debt. Given the considerable interest paid already, Lord Henley LC held it would frustrate (or "clog") Vernon's right to redeem property. As he put it protection for the borrower was warranted because "necessitous men are not, truly speaking, free men, but, to answer a present exigency, will submit to any terms that the crafty may impose upon them". Accordingly, the rule developed that "once a mortgage, always a mortgage", meaning a mortgage cannot be turned into a conveyance of the property by the operation of terms in an agreement. It means that a lender may at most sell a property to realise its value, but may not take ownership, and the borrower must always practically be able to get back the property. The rule was suspended for companies by the Companies Act 2006 section 739, and was criticised in Jones v Morgan for being inappropriate in commerce, but it still survives as a rudimentary common law method to protecting vulnerable borrowers.

=== Defective consent ===
The most relevant protective measure at common law today is the right of borrowers to cancel mortgages if they were misrepresented about the mortgage's terms, or if they entered agreements because of under influence. In the leading case, Royal Bank of Scotland v Etridge (No 2), a group of appeals all involved a husband allegedly pressuring his wife into signing a mortgage agreement with a bank, where security was over the family home. The House of Lords agreed that undue influence would make a contract voidable, and if a bank should have realised this possibility, it could not enforce the mortgage agreement against the spouse's share of the home. Accordingly, if banks wished to ensure valid mortgages they would need to have confirmation from an independent solicitor that the spouse fully understood the transaction. This ruling was intended to eliminate cases where people do not understand the consequences of mortgages. Alternatively, if despite independent advice, a spouse is still unduly influenced or is misrepresented the facts, he or she will have no recourse against a bank selling the home, but may have a claim against the solicitor for negligence.

=== Statutory market regulation ===
Beyond common law, there are three main kinds of statutory protection. First, the Financial Services and Markets Act 2000 codified a system of licensing for mortgage lenders. The Financial Conduct Authority maintains a Code of Practice and enforces compliance with the threat of license withdrawal. Second, the Consumer Credit Act 1974 empowers the Office of Fair Trading to engage in similar regulation of the second mortgage market. Third, the content of mortgage is regulated by ordinary consumer contract protection in the Unfair Terms in Consumer Contracts Regulations 1999. The general thrust of the law is to ensure complete transparency, and to cancel extortionate credit agreements, so that consumers know what they are getting, and do not get an unfair bargain.

== Lenders' rights ==
Mortgagees/money lenders have multiple remedies and powers at their disposal if the mortgagor/borrower defaults on payments. There are five main remedies, including:

1. Right to Sue
2. Power of Sale
3. Power of Foreclosure
4. Power of Possession
5. Power to Appoint a Receiver

=== Power of Sale ===
The power of sale is implied into the mortgage, therefore not requiring an express term to create the power. However, the power of sale only arises where "mortgage money has become due", and it is exercisable as a result of one or more conditions specified in the Law of Property Act 1925, s103.

When a mortgagee exercises their power of sale, there is a duty to act fairly towards the mortgagor. This duty means the mortgagee must, amongst other things,

Take reasonable care to maximise his return from the property. He must also take reasonable care of the property. Similarly if he sells the property: he cannot sell hastily at a knock-down price sufficient to pay off his debt. The mortgagor also has an interest in the property and is under a personal liability for the shortfall. The mortgagee must keep that in mind. He must exercise reasonable care to sell only at the proper market value.

Moreover, a higher duty of scrutiny will be imposed if a mortgagee sells to a related party. In Tse Kwong Lam v Wong Chit Sen Mr Wong sold property taken from Mr Tse to his wife, after not advertising the auction. The Privy Council advised that while delay in the claim meant the sale should not be set aside, damages could be awarded because of the significant conflict of interest. Lord Templeman emphasised that "a heavy onus lies on the mortgagee to show that in all respects he acted fairly" so the transaction is perfectly fair and equal. Section 88 confirms that a buyer after a sale receives an unencumbered title.

=== Power of Possession ===
The power of possession allows a mortgagee to take actual possession of the mortgaged property, and this may be for reasons including a desire to sell the property to retrieve the debt, or for the purpose of handling the property whilst it continues to produce an income. Possession is available the moment the mortgage is created, and importantly does not require any default to be exercisable. However, if the parties agree on restrictions/amendments to the power of possession, it may therefore be altered.

Regarding dwelling-houses and court issued possession orders, the court has the power to adjourn proceedings, and suspend or postpone an order of possession, if it is satisfied "that in the event of its exercising the power [of adjournment, suspension or postponement] the mortgagor is likely to be able within a reasonable period to pay any sums due under the mortgage or to remedy a default consisting of a breach of any other obligation arising under or by virtue of the mortgage". This delay may be for whatever length of time the court believes is reasonable.

The Consumer Credit Act 1974 sections 129-130 does the same for second mortgages. In an anomalous case, Ropaigealach v Barclays Bank plc a bank had auctioned off a (second) house the owning a family was away. Clarke LJ felt unable to apply the AJA 1970, because properly construed, it was only able to halt proceedings when legal proceedings had in fact been launched, and here there were none. In a more borrower-friendly decision, Cheltenham & Gloucester Building Society v Norgan Waite LJ gave guidance that in ordering a plan for repayment, a judge should give "the period most favourable to the mortgagor at the outset", so that repeated applications to court on continuing defaults could be avoided, and so that "the mortgagee can be heard with justice to say that the mortgagor has had his chance".

== Further sources ==
- First National Securities v Hegerty [1985] QB 850
- Cityland and Property (Holdings) Ltd v Dabrah [1967] 2 All ER 489
- Multiservice Bookbinding Ltd v Marden [1978] 2 All ER 489
- Davies v Directloans [1986] 2 All ER 783
- Ketley v Scott [1981] ICR 241
- Woodtsead Finance v Petrou [1986] CCLR 47
- Samuel v Jarrah [1904] AC 323, equity of redemption
- Reeve v Lisle [1902] AC 461
- Biggs v Hoddinott [1898] 2 Ch 307
- Noakes & Co Ltd v Rice [1902] AC 24
- Bradley v Carritt [1903] AC 253
- Kreglinger v New Patagonia Meat Ltd [1913] UKHL 1
- Esso Petroleum v Harper's Garage [1965] AC 269
- Crehan v Entrepreneur Pub Co [2006] UKHL 38
- Four-Maids Ltd v. Dudley Marshall Properties [1957] Ch 317, taking possession
- Western Bank v Schindler [1976] 2 All ER 393
- Administration of Justice Act 1970 ss 8 and 36
- Halifax B. Soc. v Clark [1973] Ch. 307:
- Habib Bank Ltd v Tailor [1982] 1 WLR 1218
- Bristol & West BS v Ellis (1996) 73 P. & C.R 158
- National and Provincial BS v Lloyd [1996] 1 All ER 630
- Law of Property Act 1925 ss 101, 103–107, selling property
- Law of Property Act 1925 s 101
- Land Registration Act 2002 s 48
- Law of Property Act 1925 ss 88 (2), 89(2), 91
- Cityland and Property (Holdings) Ltd v Dabrah
- CIBC Mortgages plc v Pitt [1993] UKHL 7
- Barclays Bank plc v Rivett (1997) 29 HLR 893
- Massey v Midland Bank plc [1995] 1 All ER 929
- Alliance & Leicester plc v Slayford [2001] 1 All ER 1
- Bristol and West plc v Bartlett [2002] 4 All ER 544
- West Bromwich Building Soc v Wilkinson [2005] UKHL 44
- Palk v Mortgage Services Funding plc [1993] Ch 330

== See also ==
- English land law
- English property law
- Mortgage industry of the United Kingdom
- Mortgage law
- Security interest

== Sources ==
- Cousins The Law of Mortgages (4th ed.). Sweet & Maxwell. 2017. ISBN 978-0-414-03436-5.
- Fisher and Lightwood's Law of Mortgage (15th ed.). LexisNexis. 2019. ISBN 978-1-4743-1294-3.
- Megarry & Wade: The Law of Real Property (9th ed.). Sweet & Maxwell. 2019. ISBN 978-0-414-07111-7.
