= Bank of Credit and Commerce International (Overseas) Ltd v Akindele =

BCCI (Overseas) Ltd v Akindele
- Court: Court of Appeal
- Decided: 14 June 2000
- Citations: [2000] EWCA Civ 502, [2001] Ch 437

Court membership
- Judges sitting: Nourse LJ, Ward LJ, Sedley LJ

Keywords
- Breach of trust

Bank of Credit and Commerce International (Overseas) Ltd v Akindele [2000] EWCA 502 is an English trusts law case, concerning breach of trust and knowing receipt of trust property.

== Facts ==
The liquidators of BCCI sued Chief Labode Onadimaki Akindele, a Nigerian businessman, for $6,679,226 that he got in divestiture payments in 1988. ICIC Overseas Ltd, in the BCCI group, had agreed Akindele would buy shares in BCCI Holdings, and be guaranteed a 15% pa return for a $10m investment. BCCI, in fact, gave him $16.679m to do this, thus leaving $6.679m over. Akindele did not know this was part of a fraud scheme to enable BCCI Holdings to buy its own shares. The liquidator argued he was a constructive trustee, for both knowing receipt and knowing assistance. The liquidators argued his dishonesty could be inferred from his knowledge of the artificially arranged loan transactions and his unusually high-interest rate of 15%.

The High Court refused recovery and refused to find him dishonest.

== Judgment ==
Nourse LJ held that Mr Akindele’s knowledge in 1985 was not enough to make the transaction unconscionable, and for him to retain the benefits of the divestiture payments, even though there were rumours about BCCI’s management. There was nothing to alert Mr Akindele to the transaction being tainted. Dishonesty was not needed to establish liability for knowing receipt as a constructive trustee, Belmont Finance Corp v Williams Furniture Ltd (No 2) [1980] 1 All ER 393 considered. The degrees of knowledge in Baden was unhelpful and a single test of unconscionability was better. Even if constructive knowledge was still the test, Mr Akindele did not have constructive knowledge of the breach of trust by BCCI management.

... just as there is now a single test of dishonesty for knowing assistance, so ought there to be a single test of knowledge for knowing receipt. The recipient’s state of knowledge must be such as to make it unconscionable for him to retain the benefit of the receipt. A test in that form, though it cannot, any more than any other, avoid difficulties of application, ought to avoid those of definition and allocation to which the previous categorisations have led. Moreover, it should better enable the courts to give commonsense decisions in the commercial context in which claims in knowing receipt are now frequently made.

Ward LJ and Sedley LJ concurred.

== See also ==
- English trusts law
