= Charles Harman =

English lawyer and judge

Sir Charles Eustace Harman PC (22 November 1894 – 14 November 1970) was an English lawyer and judge who was a Lord Justice of Appeal from 1959 to his retirement in mid-1970.

== Biography ==
Sir Charles Harman was born in Kensington, the son of John Eustace Harman (1861–1927), barrister of Lincoln's Inn, and his wife, Ethel Frances née Birch, of Onslow Square, central London. He was educated at Eton College and King's College, Cambridge.

His brother John Augustus (Jack), only a year and a half his senior, was killed in a 1917 flying accident, as part of his war service with the Royal Flying Corps. Charles's own university career was interrupted by World War I. He was wounded within the first year, at the Battle of Loos, and spent the rest of the war as a prisoner; he used the time to improve his languages.

Harman was appointed a Justice of the Chancery Division of the High Court of England and Wales on 12 December 1947. A few days later he was knighted. He was promoted to be a Lord Justice of Appeal in the Court of Appeal of England and Wales on 7 April 1959. Following that appointment, Harman was made a member of the Privy Council of the United Kingdom. He retired from his judicial office on 6 June 1970.

Sir Charles' son, Jeremiah Harman, was also a judge.

He died in hospital in London, aged 75.

== Notable decisions ==
Notable judicial decisions of Sir Charles included:

- Re Nanwa Gold Mines Ltd [1955] 1 WLR 1080
- Four-Maids Ltd v Dudley Marshall (Properties) Ltd [1957] Ch 317

== Arms ==
Coat of arms of Charles Harman
Notes Displayed at the Great Hall of Lincoln's Inn
