= Baden v Société Générale =

English trusts law case

- Court: High Court
- Full case name: Baden v Société Générale pour Favoriser le Developpement du Commerce et de l'Industrie en France
- Citation: [1983] BCLC 325, [1993] 1 WLR 509

Court membership
- Judge sitting: Peter Gibson J

Keywords
- Breach of trust

Baden v Société Générale pour Favoriser le Developpement du Commerce et de l'Industrie en France [1983] BCLC 325 is an English trusts law case, concerning breach of trust and knowing receipt of trust property. It was most famous for giving rise to the "Baden scale" or the "Baden knowledge scale" following on from the judgment of Peter Gibson J as to the five different types of relevant knowledge in knowing assistance cases. The use of the Baden scale has since fallen out of judicial favour in the United Kingdom.

== Facts ==
Mr Georges Baden, Jacques Delvaux and Ernest Lecuit were liquidators of the Luxembourg Mutual Investment Fund (FOF Proprietary Funds Ltd, along with a fund of funds, Venture Fund (International) NV, and IOS Growth Fund Ltd, all mutual 'dollar funds'). They claimed that Société Générale owed it $4,009,697.91, which it held for its customer, the Bahamas Commonwealth Bank Ltd in a trust account. On 10 May 1973, it followed BCB's instructions, in arrangement with Algemene Bank, Amsterdam, transferred the money to Banco Nacional de Panama, to a non-trust account in BCB's name. This, claimed Baden, made Société Générale a constructive trustee, and so had a duty to account. Alternatively, Société Générale was claimed to owe a duty of care, and to be liable in damages for the loss suffered.

== Judgment ==
Peter Gibson J held that Société Générale was not liable because it had no knowledge at the time of the fraud in which it assisted. The relevant knowledge had to be knowledge of the facts. Recklessly refraining to make enquiries that a reasonable banker would have made would be enough. But otherwise a banker had a primary obligation to comply with instructions, save in exceptional circumstances, in which it came under a duty of enquiry.

250. What types of knowledge are relevant for the purposes of constructive trusteeship? Mr. Price submits that knowledge can comprise any one of five different mental states which he described as follows: (i) actual knowledge; (ii) wilfully shutting one's eyes to the obvious; (iii) wilfully and recklessly failing to make such inquiries as an honest and reasonable man would make; (iv) knowledge of circumstances which would indicate the facts to an honest and reasonable man; (v) knowledge of circumstances which would put an honest and reasonable man on inquiry. More accurately, apart from actual knowledge they are formulations of the circumstances which may lead the court to impute knowledge of the facts to the alleged constructive trustee even though he lacked actual knowledge of those facts. Thus the court will treat a person as having constructive knowledge of the facts if he wilfully shuts his eyes to the relevant facts which would be obvious if he opened his eyes, such constructive knowledge being usually termed (though by a metaphor of historical inaccuracy) "Nelsonian knowledge". Similarly the court may treat a person as having constructive knowledge of the facts — "type (iv) knowledge" — if he has actual knowledge of circumstances which would indicate the facts to an honest and reasonable man.

251. Formulations (iii) and (v) are taken by Mr. Price from authority: see the Belmont case [1979] Ch. 250, 267, per Buckley LJ and the Selangor case [1968] 1 WLR 1555, 1590, per Ungoed-Thomas J respectively. Mr. Price submits that the court will treat a person as having constructive knowledge of the facts — "type (iii) knowledge" — if he wilfully and recklessly fails to make such inquiries as an honest and reasonable man would have made. He says that this is so even if the plaintiff cannot show that such inquiries would have given him actual knowledge of the facts. Similarly Mr. Price submits that the court may treat a person as having constructive knowledge of the facts ("type (v) knowledge") if he, without wilfulness or recklessness, fails to make such inquiries as an honest and reasonable man would have made. Again he says that this type of knowledge does not depend on the plaintiff showing that such inquiries would have given him actual knowledge of the facts. Mr. Price however accepts that these formulations require modification to this extent, that if the alleged constructive trustee can show that on a balance of probabilities inquiries would have produced answers acceptable to the honest and reasonable man even if such answers be incorrect, constructive knowledge is not to be imputed. Mr. Leckie submits that the correct formulation of these two types of knowledge includes a requirement that it must be shown that the inquiries, if made, would have given actual knowledge of the facts. This formulation comprehends Mr. Price's modification but goes beyond it in not permitting constructive knowledge to be imputed to a stranger to a trust in a case where there is no probability shown of the inquiry producing actual knowledge. Mr. Leckie's formula is substantially in accord with what Edmund Davies LJ said in Carl Zeiss Stifung v Herbert Smith & Co (No 2) [1969] 2 Ch. 276, 304, where he recognised as a possible exception to the requirement of actual knowledge the case:

where the agent is under a duty to inquire into the validity of the third party's claim and where, although inquiry would have established that it was well-founded, none is instituted.

252. I shall come back later to this difference between the parties on the formulation of type (iii) knowledge and type (v) knowledge (though on the facts this difference is not critical), but first I shall consider whether on the authorities all or any of the types of constructive knowledge that I have mentioned are relevant for the purposes of constructive trusteeship. No court which has considered the problem has been content to limit knowledge to actual knowledge.

== See also ==
- English trusts law
