= Belmont Finance Corp Ltd v Williams Furniture Ltd (No 2) =

Belmont Finance Corp v Williams Furniture Ltd (No 2)
- Court: Court of Appeal
- Citation: [1980] 1 All ER 393

Keywords
- Breach of trust, negligence, receipt

Belmont Finance Corp Ltd v Williams Furniture Ltd (No 2) [1980] 1 All ER 393 is an English trusts law case, concerning breach of trust and dishonest assistance.

== Facts ==
Belmont Finance Corp was wholly owned by City Industrial Finance, Mr James the chairman of both. Belmont’s directors paid £500,000 under a scheme to help Maximum Co, owned and controlled by Mr Grosscurth, to buy shares in Belmont from City. This was a breach of fiduciary duty and breach of the prohibition on financial assistance. City received £489,000 ultimately. Belmont later claimed City was liable to account as a constructive trustee.

== Judgment ==
The Court of Appeal held that City Industrial Finance was liable to account. Buckley LJ noted Barnes v Addy to mean that a stranger who receives some of the trust or assists with knowledge of facts in a dishonest design will be liable.

So if the directors of a company in breach of their fiduciary duties misapply the funds of their company so that they come into the hands of some stranger to the trust who receives them with knowledge (actual or constructive) of the breach, he cannot conscientiously retain those funds against the company unless he had some better equity. He becomes a constructive trustee for the company of the misapplied funds.

Goff LJ concurred.

What Belmont has to show is that the payment of the £500,000 was a misfeasance, which for this purpose is equivalent to breach of trust, that City received all or part of this money, and that it did so knowing, or in circumstances in which it ought to know, that it was a breach of trust.... ...'The long arm of equity’ is long enough to catch this sort of transaction.

Waller LJ concurred.

== See also ==
- English trusts law
