= Regulated tenancy =

A regulated tenancy is in English property law a kind of tenancy granted by a private landlord prior to 15 January 1989. There are two kinds of regulated tenancies under the Rent Act 1977: protected tenancies and statutory tenancies.
