= Palk v Mortgage Services Funding plc =

1993 Court of Appeal case concerning mortgages

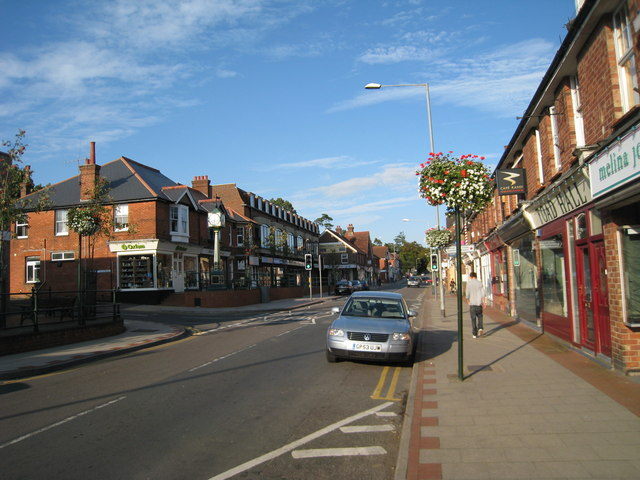
- Heathfield, East Sussex
- Court: Court of Appeal
- Full case name: Palk and Another v Mortgage Services Funding plc
- Decided: 31 July 1992
- Citations: [1993] Ch 330 [1993] 2 All ER 481 [1993] 2 WLR 415

Court membership
- Judges sitting: Sir Donald Nicholls V-C; Butler-Sloss LJ; Sir Michael Kerr

Case opinions
- Decision by: Sir Donald Nicholls V-C

Keywords
- Mortgages

Palk v Mortgage Services Funding plc [1993] Ch 330 was a judicial decision of Court of Appeal of England and Wales relating to the enforcement of mortgages. The case concerned seeking an order for sale of the property through the courts, but it was slightly unusual in that it was the mortgagors (i.e. the borrowers) who were seeking the order for sale, but the finance company holding the mortgage who were opposing it.

During the course of his judgment, the Vice Chancellor, Sir Donald Nicholls gave an overview in relation to the enforcement of mortgages under English law, and expressed various principles which the court should apply when seeking to do justice between the parties.

== Facts ==
Mr and Mrs Palk were the owners of a property in Heathfield, East Sussex. In January 1990 they mortgaged the property to Mortgage Services Funding plc to secure a loan of £300,000. However Mr Palk's business began to founder soon after, and went into insolvent liquidation. In March 1991 Mr Palk reached an agreement with a purchaser to sell the house for £283,000 but by this time the mortgage debt with accrued interest was £358,587. However Mortgage Services refused to consent to the sale due to the shortfall. So Mr and Mrs Palk commenced proceedings in the Eastbourne County Court for an order the property be sold under section 91(2) of the Law of Property Act 1925. In separate proceedings Mortgage Services sought an order for possession of the property, but those proceedings were stayed pending the outcome of the Palk's application for an order for sale.

At the time of the proceedings the amount due under the mortgage was increasing at £43,000 per year due to mounting interest charges. The maximum rentable value of the property was thought to be £13-14,000 per year. So each year that the property remained unsold, the Palks would go approximately £30,000 deeper into debt.

Mortgage Services did not want the house to be sold because property prices were depressed due to the recession. They wished to wait to see if property prices recovered before trying to sell. However this meant that they were essentially speculating on a future increase in property values at the expense of the Palks.

== County Court ==
At first instance the case came before His Honour Judge Lovegrove QC in the Eastbourne County Court, who rejected the Palk's application for an order for sale, although he stated that he did so "with a good deal of regret".

== Judgment ==
The Vice Chancellor reviewed the history of the court's discretion to order sale. He noted that the jurisdiction originally rose in relation to a power to order sale as an alternative to foreclosure, but noted that "foreclosure actions are almost unheard of today and have been so for many years." He also noted that it was long established law a mortgagee was free to choose when it exercised its power of sale, citing Lord Templeman in China and South Sea Bank Ltd v Tan [1990] 1 AC 536 at 545:

"If the creditor chose to exercise his power of sale over the mortgaged security he must sell for the current market value but the creditor must decide in his own interest if and when he should sell."

He then considered a wider range of cases relating to a mortgagee's duty in relation to exercising the power of sale, and held that those were general duties to be construed widely rather than narrow specific duties. He then commented: "That he can act in such a cavalier fashion is not a proposition that I find attractive."

He then analysed the discretion of the court on an application for sale, and noted:

"Section 91(2) gives the court a discretion in wide terms. The discretion is unfettered. It can be exercised at any time. Self-evidently, in exercising that power the court will have due regard to the interests of all concerned. The court will act judicially. But it cannot be right that the court should decline to exercise the power if the consequence will be manifest unfairness."

Having considered those points, he held that the court should exercise its discretion in favour of ordering sale, allowed the appeal, and remitted the case back to the County Court for directions.

Sir Michael Kerr gave a short concurring judgment.

== Commentary ==
The case is cited as good authority by all of the major English law texts in relation to mortgages.

== Application ==
The case has been cited and applied in numerous judicial decisions since it was handed down, including:

- Silven Properties Limited v Royal Bank of Scotland Plc [2003] EWCA Civ 1409, [2004] 1 WLR 997, [2004] 4 All ER 484
- Lloyds Bank Plc v Cassidy [2004] EWCA Civ 1767
- Meretz Investments NV v ACP Ltd [2006] EWHC 74 (Ch), [2007] Ch 197, [2006] 3 All ER 1029
- Cukurova Finance International Ltd v Alfa Telecom Turkey Ltd [2012] UKPC 20
