= Quistclose trusts in English law =

Trust to trace lent money

"Quistclose-type trusts are a species of resulting trust which arise where property (usually money) is transferred on terms which do not leave it at the free disposal of the transferee. That restriction upon its use is usually created by an arrangement that the money should be used exclusively for a stated purpose or purposes.

There must be an intention to create a trust on the part of the transferor. This is an objective question. It means that the transferor must have intended to enter into arrangements which, viewed objectively, have the effect in law of creating a trust."

Bellis v Challinor [2015] EWCA Civ 59 at 56–57, per Briggs LJ

A Quistclose trust is a trust created where a creditor has lent money to a debtor for a particular purpose. If the debtor uses the money for any other purpose, then it is held on trust for the creditor. Any inappropriately spent money can then be traced, and returned to the creditors. The name and trust comes from the House of Lords decision in Barclays Bank Ltd v Quistclose Investments Ltd (1970), although the underlying principles can be traced back further.

There has been much academic debate over the classification of Quistclose trusts in existing trusts law: whether they are resulting trusts, express trusts, constructive trusts or, as Lord Millett said in Twinsectra Ltd v Yardley, illusory trusts. At least one textbook has been written dedicated solely to exploring issues around the proper legal characterization of Quistclose trusts.

Lord Millett, writing extra-judicially, has called the Quistclose trust "probably ... the single most important application of equitable principles in commercial life", and further noting that despite 200 years of existence "it has resisted attempts by academic lawyers to analyse it in terms of conventional equitable doctrine".

== Definition ==
A Quistclose trust is a method by which a creditor can hold a security interest in loans, through inserting a clause into the contract which limits the purposes for which the borrower can use the money. If the funds are used for a different purpose, a trust is created around the money for the benefit of the moneylender. This allows the moneylender to trace any inappropriately spent funds, and, in the case of the borrower's insolvency, prevents the money from being taken by creditors. The name and trust comes from the House of Lords decision in Barclays Bank Ltd v Quistclose Investments Ltd, in which Lord Wilberforce maintained that in Quistclose situations, the intention must be to create a secondary trust for the benefit of the moneylender, arising if the "primary trust" (the appropriate use of the money) is not fulfilled. The idea of a primary and secondary trust comes from Toovey v Milne, where money was lent by A to B, to pay off his debts. When B went bankrupt and returned the money to A, the courts held that the creditors could not recover this money, as it was held in a form comparable to a trust. Most situations in which a trust will arise require that a specific use of the money is identified by the contract.

== Categorisation ==
The primary problem with Quistclose trusts is their categorisation within the accepted types of trust. The two-part trust structure (primary and secondary trusts) explained by Lord Wilberforce in Quistclose does not appear elsewhere in English trusts law, and the type of trust used affects the rights available to the parties. Quistclose trusts have variously been considered resulting, express or constructive in nature. An alternate explanation is given by Lord Millett in Twinsectra Ltd v Yardley; this is that the Quistclose trust is an "illusory trust", where the apparent beneficiary (the moneylender, for example) takes no active role. This trust is created by the intention of either party, and is revocable at any time. The problems with this idea are that the facts in Quistclose are not those of a normal illusory trust, and Millett failed to consider the mutual intention of the parties and any underlying contracts.

=== Resulting trust ===
Lord Wilberforce, in Quistclose, stated that the contract gives the moneylender an equitable interest in the loan. Under Wilberforce's two-stage trust, the interest in the money first goes from the lender to the borrower (the primary trust) and then, when the trust's purpose fails, reverses (the secondary trust). In Twinsectra Lord Millett also explained that a Quistclose trust is a resulting trust, but held that the lender retains the interest throughout the transaction, with no need for this interest to reverse if the purpose of the loan fails. The problem with Wilberforce's analysis, as explained by Alastair Hudson, Professor of Equity and Finance Law at the University of Exeter, is that because the resulting trust only comes into existence after the misuse of the loan, it may come too late; if the money is not available when the claim is brought, there is no remedy. The borrower may already have spent the money, or already be insolvent and the subject of claims by creditors.

Another flaw with both Wilberforce's and Millett's explanations is that if the interest is retained by the lender from the outset of the contract, it is not a resulting trust at all; the complete transfer of money should end the lender's equitable interest. It could be argued that the creation of a Quistclose trust is not based on the recovery of the original interest, but the creation of a new one. Doubts have also been raised about the Twinsectra case in general, in that the facts of the case did not create a stereotypical Quistclose trust; this causes problems with applying Millett's analysis.

=== Express trust ===
The second possibility is that Quistclose trusts are express trusts. If the contract included a provision that the money was to only be used for certain purposes, it could be interpreted that this money is held on trust until it is used for those purposes. The borrower would be a trustee; using the money for any other purpose would be in violation of the trustee's duties, and so void. This trust would be created as soon as the contract is agreed, with the normal requirement for it to be validly created. Two problems with this are that it has not been upheld by the English courts, and that the courts would require those explicit terms to be part of the contract; Hudson considers it the most advantageous however, because it would offer the simplest protection of the money by not requiring the contract to be breached for the trust to come into existence. In Swiss Bank Corporation v Lloyds Bank Ltd, the courts considered a situation similar to Quistclose, in that a loan agreement was made where the borrowers explicitly agreed to follow guidelines on the use of the money, something they failed to do. The Court of Appeal and the House of Lords refused to constitute any kind of trust or return the money however, applying Lord Wrenbury's judgment in Palmer v Carey, when he said that "such a stipulation will not amount to an equitable assignment".

=== Constructive trust ===
The third main theory is that Quistclose trusts could be constructive trusts, which are created when the future trustee uses the money in an "unconscionable" manner. In Quistclose situations, the requirement of "unconscionableness" could be met by the borrower using the money for a purpose other than the one for which it was lent, allowing the lender to claim an equitable interest in it. In Carreras Rothmans Ltd v Freeman Mathews Treasure Ltd, the Quistclose trust principle was said by Peter Gibson J. to be that "equity fastens on the conscience of the person who receives from another property transferred for a specific purpose only and not therefore for the recipient's own purposes, so that such person will not be permitted to treat the property as his own or to use it for other than the stated purpose"; this reference to "conscience" could make Quistclose trusts constructive in nature. However, no constructive trust could be created until the money is misused, which may be too late for an effective remedy.
