= Controlled tenancy =

Type of protected tenancy

A controlled tenancy is a type of protected tenancy that sometimes occurred with tenancies created before 6 July 1957. Controlled tenancies no longer exist as from the 28 November 1980 all controlled tenancies were converted into regulated tenancies.
