= Agip (Africa) Ltd v Jackson =

- Court: Court of Appeal
- Full case name: Agip (Africa) Limited v (1) Barry Kingsley Jackson and Edward Norman Bowers (both practising as Jackson & Co. a firm) and (2) Ian Duncan Griffin
- Decided: 21 December 1990
- Citations: [1990] EWCA Civ 2 [1990] Ch 265
- Transcript: BAILII

Court membership
- Judges sitting: Fox LJ; Butler-Sloss LJ; Beldam LJ

Case opinions
- Fox LJ

Keywords
- tracing; knowing receipt

Agip (Africa) Ltd v Jackson [1990] EWCA Civ 2 is an English trusts law case concerning the common law remedies for receipt of trust property.

== Facts ==
Mr Zdiri, an Agip Ltd employee, changed the name on a payment order of $518,000 to Baker Oil Services Ltd, a puppet controlled by Mr Jackson and other accountants, who acted on clients’ instructions. The money was transferred from Banque du Sud in Tunisia to Baker Oil’s account with Lloyds Bank in London. All but $43,000 was then paid on to unknown parties. Agip Ltd sued Mr Jackson for return of the money.

== Judgment ==
=== High Court ===
Judge Peter Millett held that Agip Ltd was entitled to an equitable proprietary claim for the $43,000 from Jackson, and that the accountants were liable for 'knowing assistance in a breach of trust'. However, Agip Ltd could not succeed for receipt of the money at common law (which did not allow electronic rather than physical tracing) or in equity (because the money was not transferred for the accountants' benefit). Banks can be liable in knowing receipt only if they receive and apply trust money to reduce or discharge a customer's overdraft. Otherwise, banks merely pay and receive money as agents of their customers. It must be for their own 'use and benefit'. He suggested that the liability for knowing receipt could be imposed if the circumstances would put an honest and reasonable person on inquiry. Agip Ltd appealed on the common law point.

=== Court of Appeal ===
The Court of Appeal upheld Judge Millett's decision. Michael Fox gave judgement, while Elizabeth Butler-Sloss and Roy Beldam concurred.
