= Barclays Bank Ltd v Quistclose Investments Ltd =

1968 UK legal case

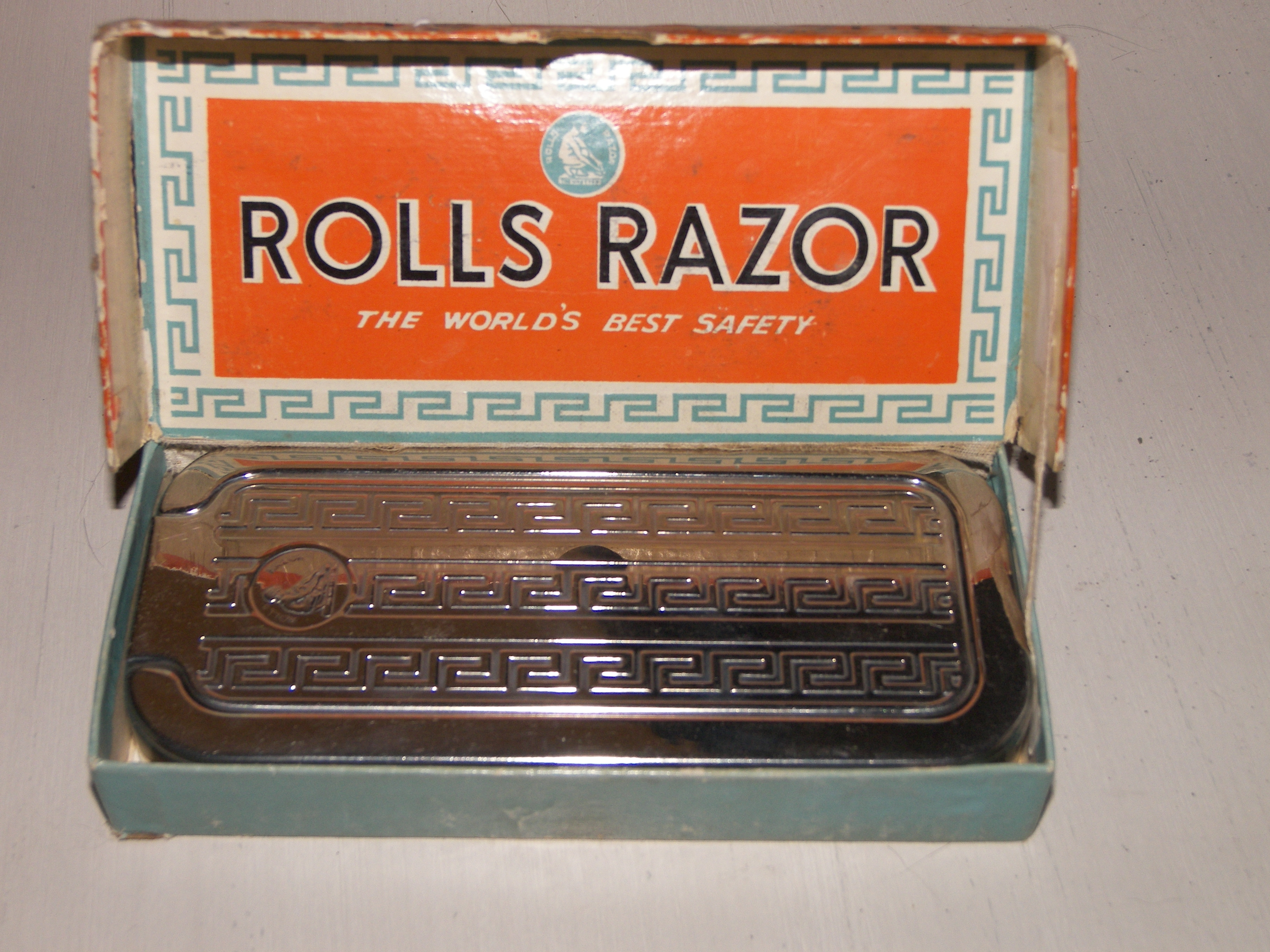
- Court: House of Lords
- Decided: 31 October 1968
- Citations: [1968] UKHL 4 [1970] AC 567

Court membership
- Judges sitting: Lord Reid; Lord Morris of Borth-Y-Gest; Lord Guest; Lord Pearce; Lord Wilberforce

Case opinions
- Lord Wilberforce

Keywords
- Quistclose trust; resulting trust

Barclays Bank Ltd v Quistclose Investments Ltd [1968] UKHL 4 is a leading property, unjust enrichment and trusts case, which created a new species of proprietary interest in English law known as the Quistclose trust.

== Background ==
The suit was initially brought by Quistclose Investments (claimant) against Barclays Bank (defendant) for a sum contained within the bank account of Rolls Razor Ltd, a third party. In 1964, Rolls Razor resolved to pay a dividend to shareholders. However, it was also in overdraft with the defendant bank, and the bank would not facilitate the payment of the dividend until the overdraft issue was resolved. Rolls Razor thereafter obtained a loan from Quistclose for the sum required to pay the dividend. (Note: Page 578)

On July 15, Rolls Razor called Barclays and informed the bank that a loan had been obtained to pay the dividend sum. Later that day, Rolls Razor sent the cheque to Barclays to be deposited into a new account to be opened thereafter, with a letter stating that "We would like to confirm the agreement reached with you this morning that this amount will only be used to meet the dividend due on July 24, 1964". (Note: Page 579)

In August, the company had become insolvent and entered into liquidation. The bank set off the credit balance in the dividend account against Rolls Razor's debit balance in the other accounts. Nonetheless, Quistclose sued Barclays, claiming that the loan was to be repaid to the investment company and could not be used to set off the debit. (Note: Page 579)

=== Issues of law ===
At the House of Lords, Lord Wilberforce, delivering the decision of the court, stated that the two issues were: First, whether "the terms upon which the loan was made were such as to impress upon the [loan] a trust in [Quistclose's] favour, in the event of the dividend not being paid." Second, "whether, in that event, the bank had such notice of the trust or of the circumstances giving rise to it as to make the trust binding upon them". (Note: Page 579)

== Judgment ==
Lord Wilberforce found in favour of Quistclose, holding that there had been a trust between Quistclose and Rolls Razor, with the bank having received notice of the trust. (Note: Pages 580-582)

First, Lord Wilberforce established that "the loan was made only so as to enable Rolls Razor Ltd to pay the dividend and for no other purpose", which was evidenced from the July 15 letter's terms, in particular the word "only". He also found that it was the mutual intention of both Quistclose and Rolls Razor "that the sum advanced should not become part of the assets of Rolls Razor Ltd, but should be used exclusively for payment of a particular class of its creditors, namely, those entitled to the dividend". As such, "if, for any reason, the dividend could not be paid, the money was to be returned" to the lenders. (Note: Page 580)

Second, Lord Wilberforce then goes on to consider the case law on the matter. He quoted Toovey v Milne (1819) 2 B&A 683 as authority for the proposition that "money advanced for a specific purpose did not become part of the bankrupt's estate". (Note: Page 580) He also distinguishes the present case from previous cases where "money has been paid to a company for the purpose of obtaining an allotment of shares", which he regarded as only demonstrating that "in the absence of some special arrangement creating a trust... payments of this kind are made upon the basis that they are to be included in the company's assets". (Note: Page 581)

Third, he responds to Barclay's arguments that because the bank was entitled to a debt action in law against Rolls Razor, a trust action in equity favourable to Quistclose was excluded. The underlying reasoning was summarised as "a transaction may attract one action or the other, it could not admit of both". He rejects this argument on two grounds. First, it would create the situation in which a lender cannot loan money to another to "to be used exclusively to pay debts" with any legal remedy to ensure that the money will be returned to the lender to the extent that it is not used to repay such debts. Such a scenario would mean that "the money [the lender] was willing to make available for one purpose only shall be freely available for others". (Note: Page 581)

Lord Wilberforce's second reason outlined a distinction between a "primary trust" and a "secondary trust" between the lender and borrower. Where such a loan is made, the lender acquires both a legal right in debt and "an equitable right to see that [the money] is applied for the primary designated purpose". If the purpose fails, there may be a "secondary purpose" of repaying the money back to the lender, which may arise expressly or by implication. Under this "secondary purpose" analysis, a "secondary trust" in favour of the lender may arise where the intention is clear, failing which the lender may only be entitled to an action for the recovery of a loan. (Note: Pages 581-582)

== Significance ==
The conceptual analysis underpinning Quistclose trusts was the source of some debate. Shortly after the decision, an article appeared in the Law Quarterly Review, written by Peter Millett QC, suggesting how the traditional trust need for certainty of objects (beneficiary) could be squared with the decision of the House of Lords and the refusal to accept new categories of purpose trust in equity. In Twinsectra Ltd v Yardley, the House of Lords reviewed the law, and the leading judgment was given by Lord Millett, whose judicial analysis unsurprisingly closely mirrored what he had suggested twenty years previously.

The key issue, according to Lord Millett, in upholding the trust concept is ascertaining where the beneficial interest in the money lies. Lord Millett suggests that there are four possible answers: (1) the lender, (2) the borrower, (3) the ultimate purpose and (4) no one in the sense that the beneficial interest remains "in suspense". Lord Millett then analysed all of the foregoing, and determined that the beneficial interest remains with the lender until the purpose for which the funds are lent is fulfilled. The only other reasoned decision was Lord Hoffmann, who agreed with Lord Millett but disagreed as to whether it was an express or resulting trust.

Some have suggested that a Quistclose trust is indubitably a trust but would not be a resulting trust as the beneficial interest never 'results back' to the lender; it was with him all the time. However, others point out that there are many resulting trusts whose beneficial interest never leaves the donor, such as the classic example of a trust failing for uncertain objects.

=== Requirements ===
It is sometimes argued that Quistclose trusts are not a separate species of trust at all but merely a simple trust that has certain characteristics. However, Quistclose trusts are often regarded as somewhat special and distinct. The English Court of Appeal, in Twinsectra Ltd v Yardley [1999] Lloyd's Rep 438, suggested obiter dictum that it was in fact a 'quasi-trust', which is not required to satisfy "the usually strict requirements for a valid trust so far as 'certainty of object[s]' is concerned. However, the House of Lords, on appeal, declined to endorse those comments.

=== Purpose ===
However, what differentiates the Quistclose trust from other trusts is the existence of the specific purpose for which the sums on credit must be applied and the failure of which gives rise to the trust. It must also be clear that if that specific purpose fails, the sums will revert to the person who originally advanced them.

The situations in which Quistclose trusts have been upheld are varied. They have been upheld in cases of:

- sums advanced for the specific payment of a dividend;
- sums advanced for the specific payment of a creditor;
- sums advanced on the basis of an undertaking for a specific project; and
- advance payments made on credit for the purchase of specific goods.

One issue that has to date escaped notice in the judicial consideration of Quistclose trusts is how narrowly the purpose has to be defined. Suggestions have been made to the effect that the general law in relation to powers would apply (such that if the purpose is sufficiently well defined to be a power, a Quistclose trust may arise), but others have argued that to take tests from one branch of the law and apply it to another may not be appropriate. The lower courts in Twinsectra suggested that the purpose must be sufficiently well defined, but Lord Millett distanced himself from that position by claiming that "uncertainty works in favour of the lender, not the borrower".

=== Certainty of intention ===
In Twinsectra v Yardley, Lord Millett spent some time considering the necessary intention. It has long been settled law that a person need not have a specific intention to create an express trust so long as the court can determine from the person's intention that a beneficial entitlement should be conferred which the law (or equity) will enforce. Thus, in Twinsectra, where there was a solicitor's undertaking that the money should be used for only one purpose, that was held to be sufficient intent. In Quistclose itself and in Carreras Rothmans v Freeman Mathews Treasure, where loans were made for a specific purpose, this may also amount to sufficient intention. If a loan is advanced for the borrower to use as he will, no Quistclose trust can arise.

=== Criticisms ===
In the early stages of development of the Quistclose trust, it was suggested that the concept was unambiguously good. In Re Kayford, it was suggested that a segregated account for customers' money to be placed in to guard against the insolvency of the company was a proper and responsible thing to do.

However, more recently, criticism has been mounted that giving a proprietary claim to a lender that enables the lender to reclaim the loan ahead of unsecured creditors has the effect of putting the lender in the position of a secured creditor, but without the need to register any security interest against the borrower (and thus meaning that other creditors would not be aware of the preferential status of the lender's claim).

Quistclose trusts still remain relatively uncommon, and as yet, there has been no clamour for legislation or regulation (Quistclose trusts were not even addressed under English law when the insolvency law was last revised in the Enterprise Act 2002). However, should the courts start finding them with increasing frequency, it may be that regulation, or judicial revision, follows.

== See also ==
- Beneficial interest
- Spendthrift trust
- Totten trust
