= Farah Constructions Pty Ltd v Say-Dee Pty Ltd =

Judgement of the High Court of Australia

Farah Constructions v Say-Dee
- Court: High Court of Australia
- Full case name: Farah Constructions Pty Ltd v Say-Dee Pty Ltd
- Decided: 24 May 2007
- Citations: [2007] HCA 22, 230 CLR 89

Court membership
- Judges sitting: Gleeson CJ, Gummow, Callinan, Heydon, Crennan, JJ

Case opinions
- appeal allowed (Gleeson CJ, Gummow, Callinan, Heydon and Crennan JJ)

Farah Constructions v Say-Dee Pty Ltd, also known as Farah, is a decision of the High Court of Australia. The case was influential in developing Australian legal doctrines relating to equity, property, unjust enrichment, and constructive trusts, as well as the doctrine of precedent as it applies in Australia.

In relation to the doctrine of precedent, the High Court held that Australian intermediate appellate courts and trial judges are bound by earlier decisions of intermediate appellate courts when construing federal and uniform national legislation, as well as non-statutory law, unless convinced that the earlier decision was 'plainly wrong'. It further held that lower courts in Australia must obey the 'seriously considered dicta' of a High Court majority.

The decision also resolved in part the relationship between Barnes v Addy liability and the Torrens system; the court definitively stated that unjust enrichment is not the doctrinal basis for such claims.

== Background ==
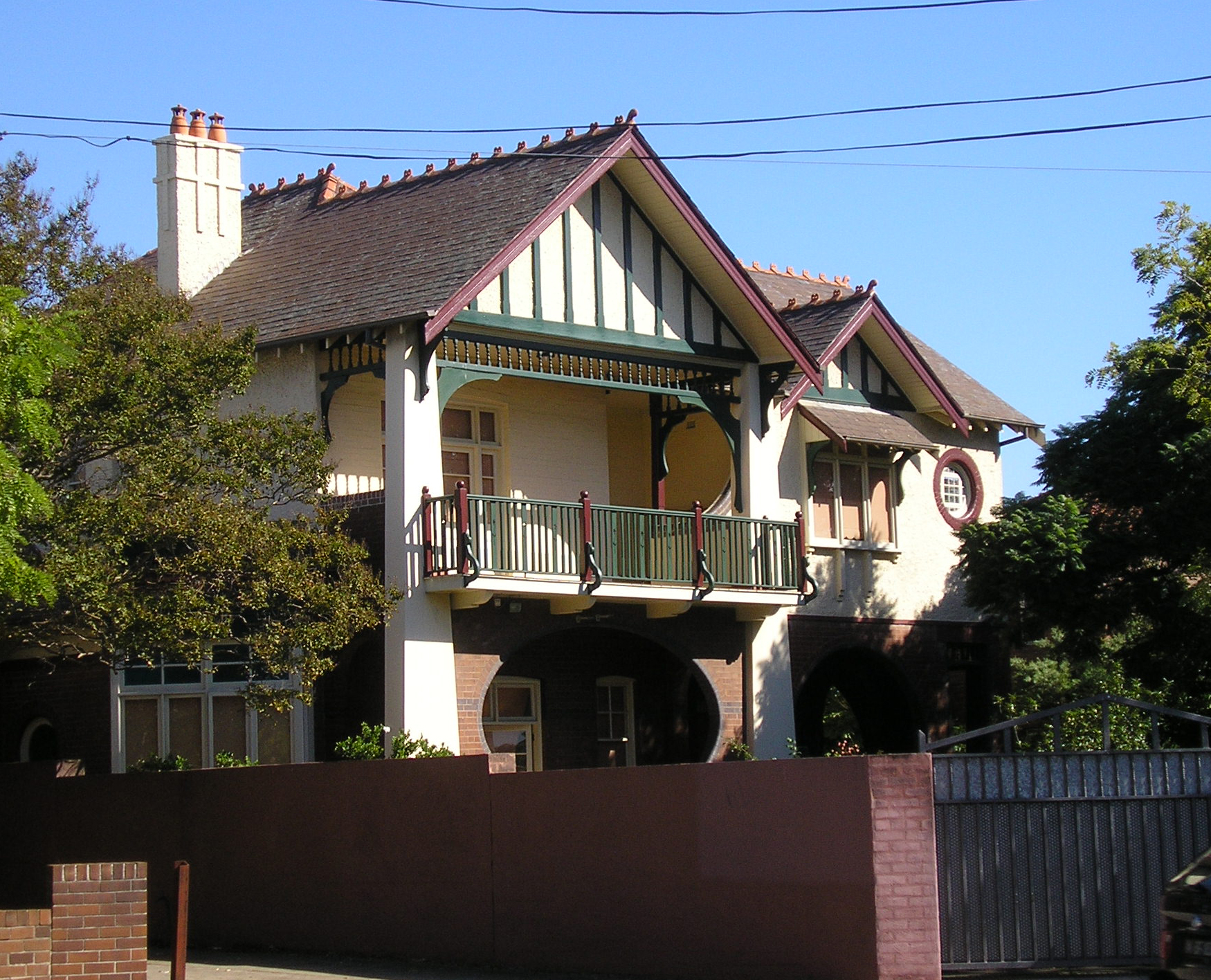
Pictured: a house in Burwood, NSW. The property dispute in Farah related to a residential construction project in that suburb.

The case concerned remedies claimed by Say-Dee Pty Ltd against Farah Constructions Pty Ltd. Say-Dee claimed a constructive trust over property held by Farah and its associates, as remedy for Farah having breached a fiduciary duty owed to Say-Dee.

In early 1998, Farah Pty Ltd entered into an agreement with Say-Dee Pty Ltd to purchase and redevelop a residential property in Burwood. The principals of Say-Dee were to provide capital, while the principal of Farah was to manage the project. The development application stalled. Essentially, the council considered the property (No 11) too narrow for the proposed construction. Between June 2001 - August 2002, the principal of Farah along with his wife, two daughters, and another company he controlled; bought two adjacent properties Nos 13 & 15. Thereafter, the relationship between Say-Dee and Farah deteriorated. In March 2003, Farah filed a summons in the Supreme Court of New South Wales, seeking the appointment of a trustee for sale in respect of No 11.

Say-Dee filed a cross-claim, seeking declarations that Farah Pty Ltd, its principal, the family, and the second company all held their property interests on constructive trust for the partnership between Say-Dee and Farah.

== Procedural history ==
=== At first instance ===
At first instance in the Supreme Court of New South Wales, Justice Palmer found that Say-Dee had declined invitations to participate in the purchase of Nos 13 & 15. He held that Farah's fiduciary duties didn't extend to an obligation to disclose information about opportunities to acquire the properties. Therefore, there was no breach of fiduciary duty.

=== Court of Appeal of New South Wales ===
Farah's associates were found by the Court of Appeal of New South Wales to have knowingly received property flowing from that breach, giving rise to liability under the 'first limb' of Barnes v Addy.

Tobias JA, (Mason P and Giles JA agreeing), reversed many of the trial judge's findings of fact. They found Say-Dee had not been invited to participate in the purchase of Nos 13 & 15; and that Farah was obliged through fiduciary duty to disclose this and other information to Say-Dee. Farah was therefore found in breach.

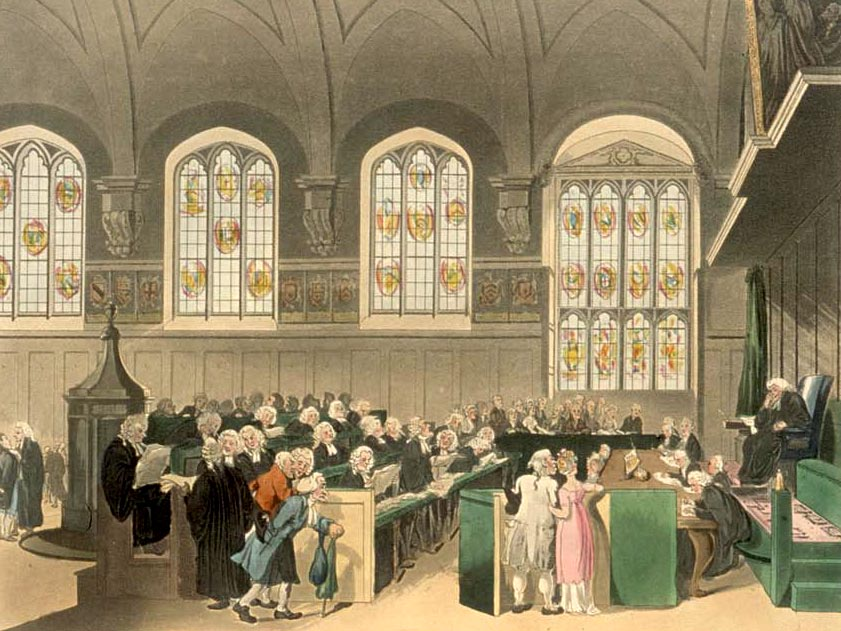
Pictured: The Court of Chancery, in which doctrines of equity originated

It was held that the family members of Farah's principal were liable as recipients of the benefit of a breach of fiduciary duty. It was decided that the first limb of Barnes v Addy ought apply, as they had the sufficient level of knowledge for a 'knowing receipt' finding to be made. It was found then that they held their interests in a constructive trust for Say-Dee.

Independent to this finding, Tobias JA suggested that unjust enrichment may be the true doctrinal basis of the first limb in Barnes v Addy, writing in obiter that knowledge might be unnecessary for a finding of liability under that limb. His suggestion followed a brief survey of legal thought on the topic; including comments by the private law expert Peter Birks, two prominent equity decisions in the UK, and citations with approval of that UK case law by Hansen J in the Victorian Supreme Court.

After first noting a lack of High Court authority on the issue, (Note: The High Court authority discussed by Tobias JA; (Consul Development), dealt with the 'second limb' of Barnes v Addy. The facts in Farah concerned the first.) Tobias JA said he saw 'no reason why the proverbial bullet should not be bitten by this court in favour of the Birks/Hansen approach'. He held in obiter that the law should develop in that way, and ordered that all defendants be liable for benefit derived from the acquisition of the properties.

By grant of special leave, Farah and its co-defendants appealed to the High Court.

== Judgment of the High Court ==
In a unanimous judgment, the High Court allowed an appeal by Farah and restored the trial judge's initial dismissal of the claim. The High Court overturned 'practically every finding' made by the Court of Appeal. It upheld the trial judge's finding that there was no breach of fiduciary duty; and in obiter discussed the principles of recipient liability.

The harshest criticism directed at the judgment of the Court of Appeal of New South Wales was for having dealt with the restitution issue at all. The High Court considered that it was procedurally unfair to have made unjust enrichment an aspect of the ultimate decision, when neither party had been invited to make submissions on that issue. Farah had been denied the opportunity for a legal defence.

Two major ideas regarding the doctrine of precedent were expressed by the High Court in its criticisms of the intermediate judgment. The first was that lower courts must obey the 'seriously considered dicta' of a High Court majority. The second was that intermediate appellate courts and trial judges in Australia should not depart from decisions of intermediate appellate courts in another jurisdiction unless convinced the decision is 'plainly wrong'. The principle was expressed to apply in relation to the interpretation of Commonwealth and uniform national legislation, as well as decisions relating to non-statutory law. The lower court was criticised for apparent disobedience to previous obiter dicta, and for being out of step with common law holdings of other states.

Additionally, in a 'surprisingly brief' section, the High Court held that registration of a property interest under the Torrens system; is enough to defeat a claim for a constructive trust remedy on the first limb of Barnes v Addy. Intermediate courts had previously been split in opinion on this issue.

== Criticism ==
Some academics have argued that the High Court's decision in Farah changed the way that lower courts in Australia apply the concepts of ratio decidendi and obiter dicta. More generally, the case 'has been seen as an admonition to superior State courts ... against liberalising (legal) doctrines'.

Farah has been criticized by Australian legal commentators for both of the major holdings that it is known for. Private law scholars have criticized the case for a lack of clarity and undue brevity in its equity and unjust enrichment holdings. Meanwhile, public law scholars have voiced criticism for its comments on the doctrine of precedent, one calling it 'a truly radical and ill-conceived constitutional innovation'.

One of the appellate judges overturned in the case, Keith Mason, also criticized the decision in his retirement speech; describing it as a 'profound shift in the rules of judicial engagement', and (an) 'assertion of a High Court monopoly in the essential developmental aspect of the common law', adding that 'If lower courts are excluded from venturing contributions that may push the odd envelope, then the law will be poorer for it'.

== See also ==
- List of High Court of Australia cases
