= Statutory tenancy =

Type of tenancy in the United Kingdom

A statutory tenancy is a type of tenancy in England and Wales s2(1)(a) of the Rent Act 1977.
