= Royal Brunei Airlines Sdn Bhd v Tan =

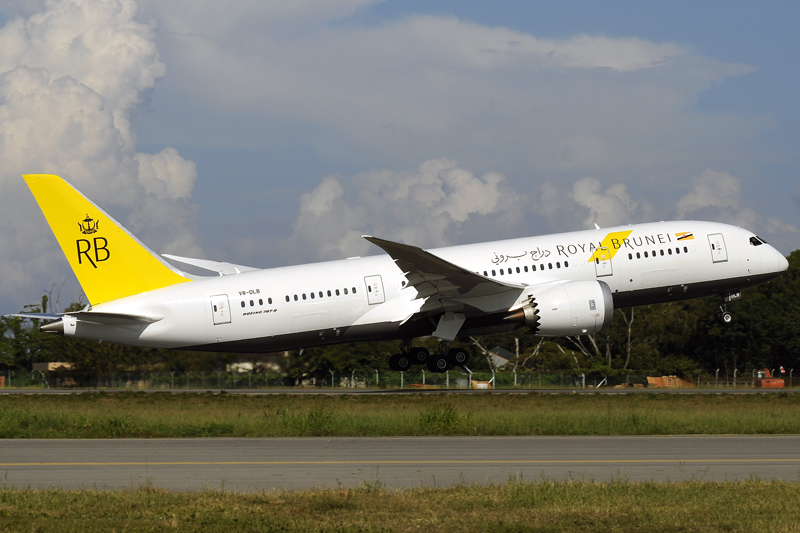
- Court: Privy Council
- Full case name: Royal Brunei Airlines Sdn Bhd (Appellant) v Philip Tan Kok Ming (Respondent)
- Decided: 24 May 1995
- Citations: [1995] UKPC 4, [1995] 2 AC 378

Case history
- Prior action: Court of Appeal of Brunei

Court membership
- Judges sitting: Lord Goff, Lord Ackner, Lord Nicholls, Lord Steyn, Sir John May

Case opinions
- Lord Nicholls

Keywords
- Breach of trust, dishonest assistance

Royal Brunei Airlines Sdn Bhd v Tan [1995] UKPC 4 is an English trusts law case, concerning breach of trust and liability for dishonest assistance.

== Facts ==
Royal Brunei Airlines appointed Borneo Leisure Travel Sdn Bhd to be its agent for booking passenger flights and cargo transport around Sabah and Sarawak. Mr Tan was Borneo Leisure Travel's managing director and main shareholder. It was receiving money for Royal Brunei, which was agreed to be held on trust in a separate account until passed over. But Borneo Leisure Travel, with Mr Tan's knowledge and assistance, paid money into its current account and used it for its own business. Borneo Leisure Travel failed to pay on time, the contract was terminated, and it went insolvent. Royal Brunei claimed the money back from Mr Tan.

The judge held Mr Tan was liable as a constructive trustee to Royal Brunei. The Court of Appeal of Brunei Darussalam held that the company was not guilty of fraud or dishonesty, and so Mr Tan could not be either. The case was appealed to the Privy Council, where the Privy Council found in favour of the claimant, reversing the decision of the Court of Appeal.

== Advice ==
Giving the advice of the Privy Council, Lord Nicholls held it was the dishonest assistant's state of mind which matters. Knowledge depends on a ‘gradually darkening spectrum’. Therefore, the test for being liable in assisting breach of trust must depend on dishonesty, which is objective. It is irrelevant what the primary trustee's state of mind is, if the assistant is himself dishonest.

Whatever may be the position in some criminal or other contexts (see, for instance, R v Ghosh [1982] QB 1053), in the context of the accessory liability principle acting dishonestly, or with a lack of probity, which is synonymous, means simply not acting as an honest person would in the circumstances. This is an objective standard. At first sight this may seem surprising. Honesty has a connotation of subjectivity, as distinct from the objectivity of negligence. Honesty, indeed, does have a strong subjective element in that it is a description of a type of conduct assessed in the light of what a person actually knew at the time, as distinct from what a reasonable person would have known or appreciated. Further, honesty and its counterpart dishonesty are mostly concerned with advertent conduct, not inadvertent conduct. Carelessness is not dishonesty. Thus for the most part dishonesty is to be equated with conscious impropriety. However, these subjective characteristics of honesty do not mean that individuals are free to set their own standards of honesty in particular circumstances. The standard of what constitutes honest conduct is not subjective. Honesty is not an optional scale, with higher or lower values according to the moral standards of each individual. If a person knowingly appropriates another's property, he will not escape a finding of dishonesty simply because he sees nothing wrong in such behaviour.

Lord Goff, Lord Ackner, Lord Steyn and Sir John May concurred.

== See also ==
- English trusts law
- Lumley v Gye [1853] EWHC QB J73
