= Donald Nicholls, Baron Nicholls of Birkenhead =

British barrister (1933–2019)

The Right Honourable The Lord Nicholls of Birkenhead PC
- Nicholls in the Pinochet case, 1998

Second Senior Lord of Appeal in Ordinary
- In office 1 October 2002 – 10 January 2007
- Monarch: Elizabeth II
- Preceded by: The Lord Slynn of Hadley
- Succeeded by: The Lord Hoffmann

Lord of Appeal in Ordinary
- In office 3 October 1994 – 10 January 2007
- Preceded by: The Lord Templeman
- Succeeded by: The Lord Neuberger of Abbotsbury

Member of the House of Lords
- Lord Temporal
- Lord of Appeal in Ordinary; 3 October 1994 – 3 April 2017

Personal details
- Born: 25 January 1933 United Kingdom
- Died: 25 September 2019 (aged 86)
- Education: Liverpool University; Trinity Hall, Cambridge
- Occupation: Judge

Donald James Nicholls, Baron Nicholls of Birkenhead, PC (25 January 1933 – 25 September 2019) was a British barrister who became a Law Lord (Lord of Appeal in Ordinary).

== Biography ==
Nicholls was educated at Birkenhead School, before reading Law at Liverpool University and Trinity Hall, Cambridge. He was called to the bar in 1958 as a member of the Middle Temple, becoming a Queen's Counsel in 1974. He was made a High Court judge on 30 September 1983, receiving the customary knighthood. On 10 February 1986, he was appointed a Lord Justice of Appeal and subsequently appointed to the Privy Council. He became Vice-Chancellor of the Supreme Court on 1 October 1991. He was appointed a Lord of Appeal in Ordinary on 3 October 1994 and consequently created a life peer as Baron Nicholls of Birkenhead, of Stoke d'Abernon in the County of Surrey.

In 1998, Nicholls and the other Law Lords came to the international fore in deciding whether Augusto Pinochet could be extradited to Spain. Three lords, including Nicholls, rejected the argument that Pinochet was immune from arrest and prosecution for his acts as Head of State in Chile. They said the State Immunity Act 1978 flouted a battery of international legislation on human rights abuses to which Britain is a signatory, and secondly, it would have meant endorsing the arguments of Pinochet's legal team that British law would have protected even Adolf Hitler. Nicholls said,

International law has made plain that certain types of conduct, including torture and hostage-taking, are not acceptable conduct on the part of anyone. This applies as much to heads of state, or even more so, as it does to everyone else. The contrary conclusion would make a mockery of international law."

He became Second Senior Law Lord on 1 October 2002, and retired in 2007, succeeded by Lord Hoffmann.

From 1998 to 2004, he was a Non-Permanent Judge of the Hong Kong Court of Final Appeal.

He retired from the House of Lords on 3 April 2017.

He died on 25 September 2019 at the age of 86.

== Judgments ==
- Harries v The Church Commissioners for England [1992] 1 WLR 1241
- Royal Brunei Airlines Sdn Bhd v Tan [1995] 2 AC 378
- Attorney General v Blake [2001] 1 AC 268
- White v White [2001] 1 AC 596
- Reynolds v Times Newspapers Ltd [2001] 2 AC 127
- Royal Bank of Scotland plc v Etridge [2001] UKHL 44
- Fairchild v Glenhaven Funeral Services Ltd [2002] UKHL 22
- Shogun Finance Ltd v Hudson [2003] UKHL 62
- Tomlinson v Congleton Borough Council [2003] UKHL 47
- Wilson v First County Trust Ltd [2003] UKHL 40
- Bellinger v Bellinger [2003] UKHL 21
- Campbell v Mirror Group Newspapers Ltd [2004] UKHL 22
- A and others v Secretary of State for the Home Department [2004] UKHL 56
- Archibald v Fife Council [2004] UKHL 32
- Ghaidan v Godin-Mendoza [2004] 2 AC 557
- Cream Holdings Ltd v Banerjee and the Liverpool Post and Echo Ltd [2004] UKHL 44
- National Westminster Bank plc v Spectrum Plus Ltd [2005] UKHL 41
- Gregg v Scott [2005] UKHL 2
- Jackson v Royal Bank of Scotland [2005] UKHL 3
- Jackson v Attorney General [2005] UKHL 56
- R (Begum) v Governors of Denbigh High School [2006] UKHL 15
- R v Saik [2006] UKHL 18
- OBG Ltd v Allan [2007] UKHL 21
- Palk v Mortgage Services Funding plc [1993] Ch 330

== Publications ==
- Lord Nicholls, 'Trustees and their broader community: where duty, morality and ethics converge’ (1995) 9(3) Trusts Law International 71

== Arms ==
Coat of arms of Donald Nicholls, Baron Nicholls of Birkenhead
Crest A demi-mole Sable holding between the paws a daffodil slipped and leaved Or. Escutcheon Sable two bars each between two cotises set on the outer edge with birch leaves Or. Supporters On either side a cormorant wings displayed and inverted Sable beaked and legged Or. Motto Let Equity Prevail

== See also ==
- English law

Legal offices
Preceded by Sir Nicolas Browne-Wilkinson	Vice-Chancellor; 1991–1994	Succeeded by Sir Richard Scott
