= English land law =

Law of real property in England and Wales

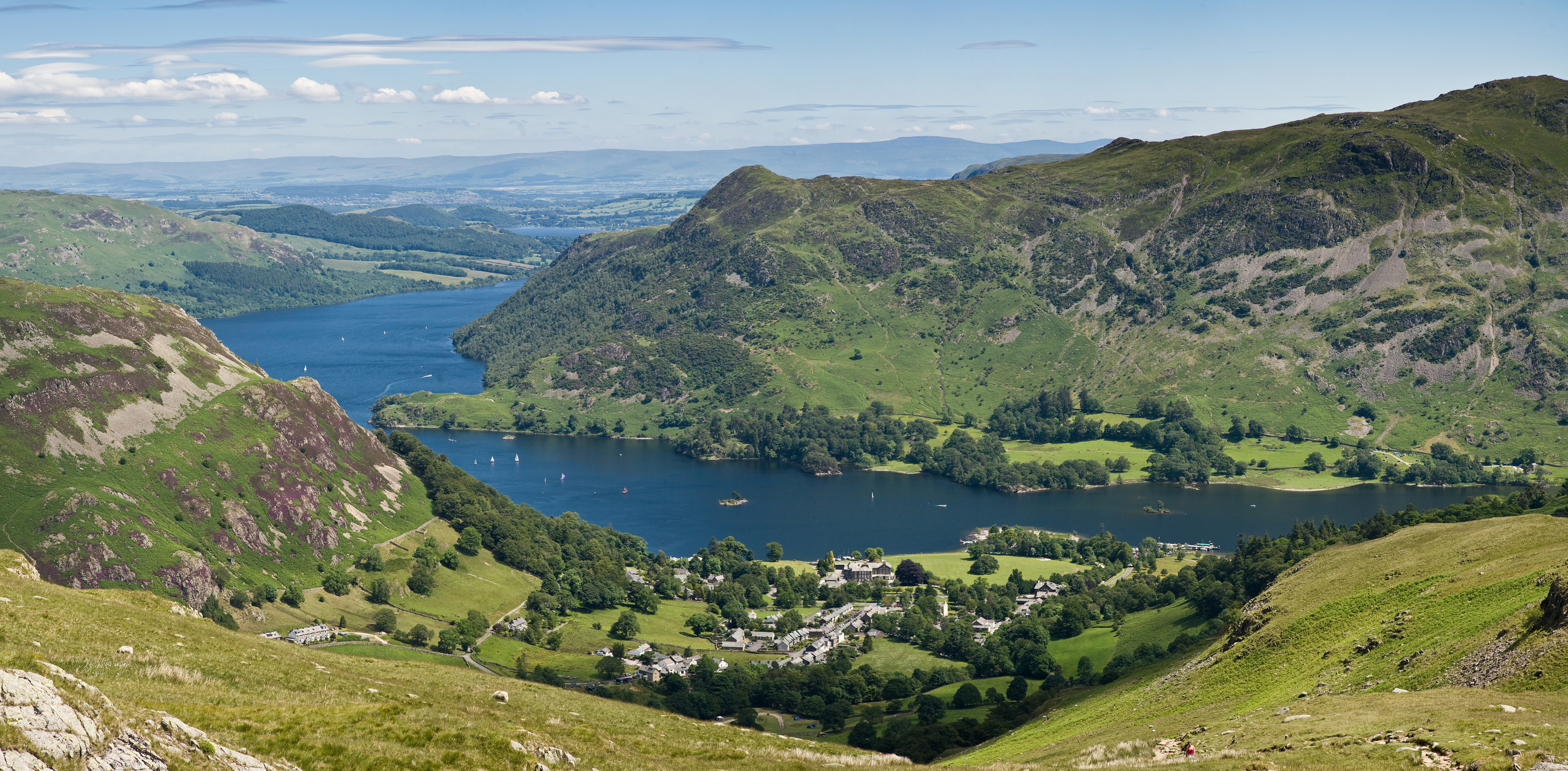
The area of land in England and Wales is 151,174 km^{2} (58,368 mi^{2}), while the United Kingdom is 243,610 km^{2}. By 2013, 82 per cent was formally registered at HM Land Registry. In 2010, over a third of the UK was owned by 1,200 families descended from aristocracy, and 15,354 km^{2} was owned by the top three land owners, the Forestry Commission, National Trust and Defence Estates. The Crown Estate held around 1,448 km^{2}.

English land law is the law of real property in England and Wales. Because of its heavy historical and social significance, land is usually seen as the most important part of English property law. Ownership of land has its roots in the feudal system established by William the Conqueror after 1066, but is now mostly registered and sold on the real estate market. The modern law's sources derive from the old courts of common law and equity, and legislation such as the Law of Property Act 1925, the Settled Land Act 1925, the Land Charges Act 1972, the Trusts of Land and Appointment of Trustees Act 1996 and the Land Registration Act 2002. At its core, English land law involves the acquisition, content and priority of rights and obligations among people with interests in land. Having a property right in land, as opposed to a contractual or some other personal right, matters because it creates priority over other people's claims, particularly if the land is sold on, the possessor goes insolvent, or when claiming various remedies, like specific performance, in court.

Land is usually acquired, first, by a contract of sale, and to complete a purchase, the buyer must register their interest with His Majesty's Land Registry. Similar systems run in Scotland and Northern Ireland. Around 15 per cent of land in England and Wales remains unregistered, so property disputes are still determined by principles developed by the courts. Human rights, like the right to a family life and home under ECHR article 8 and the right to peaceful enjoyment of possessions, under article 1 of the First Protocol, apply for everyone. Second, people may acquire rights in land by contributing to a home's purchase price, or to family life, if the courts can find evidence of a common intention that rights should be created. The law acknowledges a "resulting" or "constructive trust" over the property. These interests, and leases under 7 years length, do not need to be registered to be effective. Third, people can acquire land through proprietary estoppel. If someone is given an assurance that they will receive property, and they rely on this to their detriment, a court may acknowledge it. Fourth, adverse possession allows people who possess land, without formal objection by the owner, although this is now difficult to achieve in respect of a registered title.

Multiple people can be interested in land, and it can be used in multiple ways. There could be a single freeholder, or people can own land jointly. The law closely regulates the circumstances under which each may sever or sell their share. Leases, and to some degree licences, allocate the use of land to new owners for a period of time. Mortgages and other forms of security interest are usually used to give moneylenders the right to seize property if the debtor does not repay a loan. Easements and covenants involve rights and duties between neighbours, for instance with an agreement that a neighbour will not build on a piece of land, or to grant a right of way.

On top of these rules of transactions and priority, there is a wide body of regulation over the social use of land. Planning rules seek to ensure that communities and the environment are good to live in. Although very limited, there are some rights to social housing, and tenants have limited rights against landlords that override contract to counteract tenants' unequal bargaining power. Agriculture and forestry covers most of the UK land mass and is important for fair food prices. Gas, oil and coal have historically been energy sources, but now legal policy is to replace them with renewable energy is crucial to halt climate damage.

== History ==
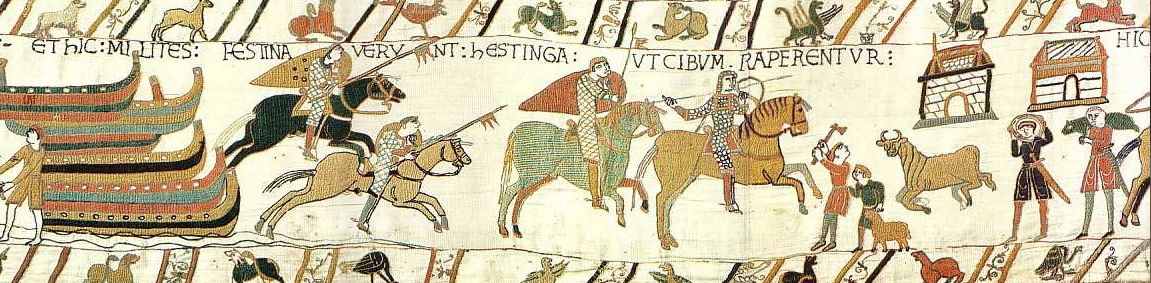
The Bayeux Tapestry depicts William the Conqueror's knights seizing food from English peasants. The Domesday Book of 1086 recorded at least 12% of people as free, 30% as serfs, 35% as servient bordars and cottars, and 9% as slaves.

The history of English land law can be traced into Roman times, and through the Dark Ages under Saxon monarchs where, as for most of human history, land was the dominant source of social wealth. The start of an English law of real property, however, came after the Norman Invasion of 1066, when a common law was built throughout England. The new King, William the Conqueror, started standardising England's feudal rules, and compiled a reference for all land and its value in the Domesday Book of 1086. This was used to determine taxes, and the feudal dues that were to be paid. Feudalism meant that all land was held by the Monarch. Estates in land were granted to lords, who in turn parcelled out property to tenants. Tenants and lords had obligations of work, military service, and payment of taxation to those up the chain, and ultimately to the Crown. Most of the peasantry were bonded to their masters. Serfs, cottars or slaves, who may have composed as much as 88 per cent of the population in 1086, were bound by law to work on the land. They could not leave without permission of their Lords. But also, even those who were classed as free men were factually limited in their freedom, by the limited chances to acquire property. Around 1187 Ranulf de Glanvill, King Henry II's Chief Justiciar composed the first major treatise of the common law, the Tractatus de legibus et consuetudinibus regni Angliae, setting out the system of writs that people used to claim rights of property, and rights against one another. Glanvill himself died in the Third Crusade, and as discontent resulting from the crusades' cost grew, English barons forced King John to sign Magna Carta. This guaranteed rights of representation to the barons, but contained very little for "commoners". However, a number of clauses were extracted and expanded into the Charter of the Forest 1217, which did allow people access to common land, where people could hunt and fish for food. Over the centuries, the law expanded on the extent of common ownership, but generally the trend was toward removing land from people. The Commons Act 1236 allowed the Lord of a Manor to enclose any manorial land that had previously been common, and the Statute of Westminster 1285 formalised the system of entail so that land would only pass to the heirs of a landlord. The Statute Quia Emptores Terrarum 1290 allowed alienation of land only by substitution of the title holder, halting creation of further sub-tenants. The civil liberties of Magna Carta of 1215, and its reissue in 1297, were only meant for barons and lords, while the vast majority of people were poor, subjugated and dispossessed. In 1256, the second major treatise, by Henry de Bracton, De Legibus et Consuetudinibus Angliae set out the laws of property or "things", alongside laws of "persons" and "actions".

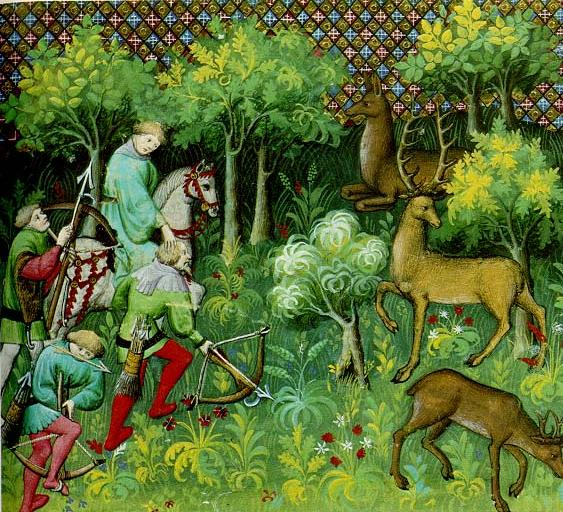
The Charter of the Forest 1217, a companion to Magna Carta, embodied social rights for people to use common land for hunting and farming until more and more was enclosed. Leaders of the Peasants' Revolt of 1381 preached that "matters goeth not well to pass in England, nor shall not do till everything be common, and that there be no villains nor gentlemen, but that we may be all unied [sic] together, and that the lords be no greater masters than we be".

Feudalism had not always been a part of English society, rather than being positively imposed by the monarchs prior to the Norman Invasion. However, from 1348 everything changed as the Black Death swept through Europe, killing a third of the population. People like the poet Geoffrey Chaucer had seen subservience as part of a natural social order, ordained by God. But if landowners had themselves survived the plague, the peasants' labour on the land had become very scarce. Ironically, the surviving peasants were in a greater position of economic power, in claims or bargaining for wages. Feudalism began to break down. First, serfs could go undergo "commutation", where the lord simply agreed to accept money rents from tenants instead of labour services. This did not mean freedom itself, but abandoning forced labour and payments in kind to landlords meant the open evidence of servility was concealed. In disputes, royal courts were increasingly bias toward declaring a peasant was free. Second, through an act of manumission lords could voluntarily grant freedom and this was increasingly done, after the plague, if the serf or a relative made a payment of money. Third, the common law stated that if a serf lived on free soil, as in a chartered town or Royal demesne land, for a year and a day, they would become free. The nobility and the King reacted to the rising bargaining power of the peasantry by fixing wages, and violently suppressing any uprisings, like the Peasants' Revolt in 1381. Yet this combination of factors, slowly but surely, meant that by 1485 just one per cent of the population were left in bondage. Around 1481, a judge of the Common Pleas named Thomas de Littleton produced the first treatise organised by subject rather than writs, on property law, the Treatise on Tenures. Formal subservience was increasingly seen as a social scar. In 1523 Justice Anthony Fitzherbert wrote that the remainder of bondmen was "the greatest inconvenience that now is suffred by the lawe." But if more people were formally free from a landlord, people's factual freedom was still constrained because they had no property themselves. More landlords were enclosing pastures that had been open for commoners to use, and destroying people's houses, especially for sheep farming. The crown, and Lord Chancellors like Sir Thomas More, had opposed this to some extent, with a series of Anti-Enclosure Acts from 1489. These required that any houses destroyed be rebuilt, but if not half the additional profits would go to the Crown. The Crown itself claimed an inherent right to any valuable metals found on land in 1568, and people who had less than four acres of land were prohibited from building homes by the Erection of Cottages Act 1588. The final, formal end of feudal land tenure in England came only after the English Civil War. When the monarchy was restored Parliament ensured with the Tenures Abolition Act 1660 that landlords' obligations of service and military provision were replaced by monetary payments and an annual payment financed by taxation.

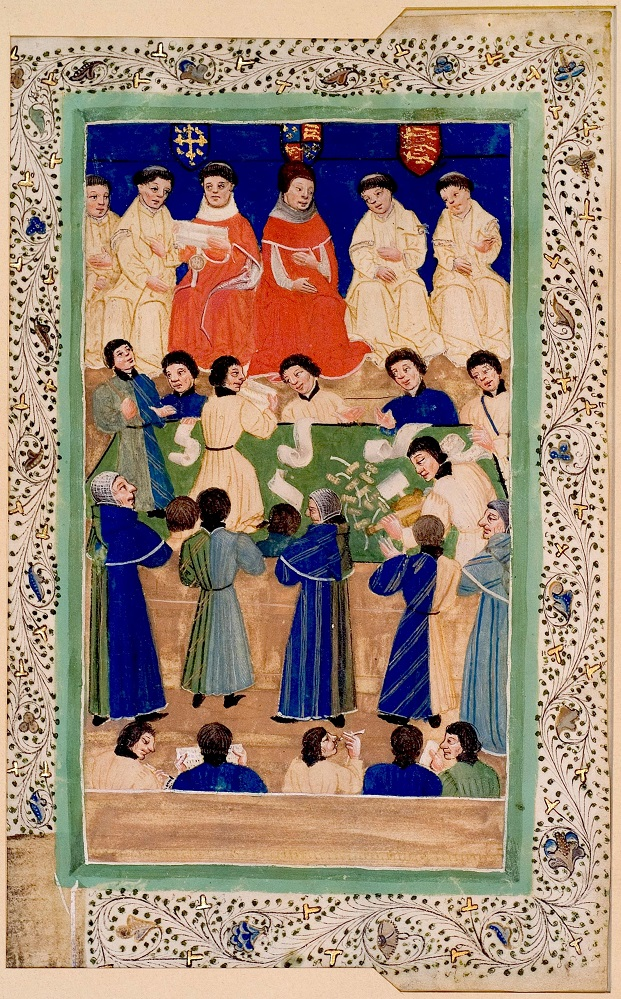
The Court of Chancery could mitigate the injustice of strict common law rules of property, if the Lord Chancellor deemed it equitable. The court systems were merged by the Judicature Acts of 1873–1875.

Over the same period, behind the momentous shifts in land's social significance, legal developments in the law of property revolved around the split between the courts of common law and equity. The courts of common law (the Court of Common Pleas and the Court of the King's Bench) took a strict approach to the rules of title to land, and how many people could have legal interests in land. However, the King had the power to hear petitions and overturn cases of common law. He delegated the hearing of petitions to his Lord Chancellor, whose office grew into a court. During the crusades, landowners who went to fight would transfer title to a person they trusted so that feudal services could be performed and received. But some who survived had returned only to find that the people they entrusted were refusing to transfer title back. They sought justice with the Lord Chancellor, and his Court of Chancery determined that the true "use" or "benefit" of the land did not belong to the person on the title (or the feoffee who held seisin). Unlike the common law judges, the Chancellor held the cestui que use, the owner in equity, could be a different person, if this is what good conscience dictated. This recognition of a split in English law, between legal and equitable owner, between someone who controlled title and another for whose benefit the land would be used, was the beginning of trust law. It was similarly useful among Franciscan friars, who would transfer title of land to others as they were precluded from holding property by their vows of poverty. Uses or trusts were also employed to avoid the payment of feudal dues. If a person died, the law stated a landlord was entitled to money before the land passed to heir, and the whole property under the doctrine of escheat if there were no heirs. Transferring title to a group of people for common use could ensure this never happened, because if one person died he could be replaced, and it was unlikely for all to die at the same time. King Henry VIII saw that this deprived the Crown of revenue, and so in the Statute of Uses 1535 he attempted to prohibit them, stipulating all land belonged in fact to the cestui que use. However, when Henry VIII was gone, the Court of Chancery held that it had no application where land was leased. Moreover, the primacy of equity over the common law was reasserted, supported by King James I in 1615, in the Earl of Oxford's case. The institution of the use continued, as new sources of revenue from the mercantile exploits in the New World decreased the Crown's reliance on feudal dues. By the early 18th century, the use had formalised into a trust: where land was settled to be held by a trustee, for the benefit of another, the Courts of Chancery recognised the beneficiary as the true owner in equity.

"As soon as the land of any country has all become private property, the landlords, like all other men, love to reap where they never sowed, and demand a rent even for its natural produce. The wood of the forest, the grass of the field, and all the natural fruits of the earth, which, when land was in common, cost the labourer only the trouble of gathering them, come, even to him, to have an additional price fixed upon them. He must then pay for the licence to gather them; and must give up to the landlord a portion of what his labour either collects or produces. This portion, or, what comes to the same thing, the price of this portion, constitutes the rent of land ...."

— Adam Smith, The Wealth of Nations (1776) Book I, ch 6

Over the 18th century, the law of real property mostly came to a standstill in legislation, but principles continued to develop in the courts of equity, notably under Lord Nottingham (from 1673–1682), Lord King (1725–1733), Lord Hardwicke (1737–1756), Lord Henley (1757–1766), and Lord Eldon (1801–1827). As national and global trade expanded, the power of a new monied class of business men was growing, and the economic and political importance of land was diminishing with it. The moral philosopher and father of economics, Adam Smith, reflected these changes as he argued in The Wealth of Nations that landowners position allowed them to extract rents from others in return for very little. In the 19th century, a growing liberal movement for reform produced three major results. First, there was increasing pressure to dismantle the privileges of the landed aristocracy. The most direct reform was to gradually abolition the "strict settlement", through the Settled Land Acts of 1882–1925. An owner of land could direct that property on his death would only pass down the line of his relations, thus preventing it being sold to anyone on the market. This also included the view that all land should be put on a register, so as to ease its ability to be marketed. The Land Transfer Act 1875 introduced a voluntary system, but it was not taken up. After the 1906 general election the new Chancellor of the Exchequer, David Lloyd George, in his People's Budget of 1909 introduced a tax on land to force it onto the market. This provoked a constitutional crisis, as the hereditary House of Lords vetoed it, forcing fresh elections. But the Liberal government was returned and it abolished the Lords right of veto in the Parliament Act 1911. By then, land registration reforms were a minor political issue and only really opposed by solicitors who earned sizeable conveyancing fees. Eventually, the Land Registration Act 1925 required any dealing with property triggered compulsory registration. Second, the Court of Chancery, though it may have mitigated the petty strictnesses of the common law of property, was seen as cumbersome and arcane. It was subjected to ridicule in books like Charles Dickens' Bleak House and his fictional case of Jarndyce v Jarndyce, a Chancery matter that nobody understood and dragged on for years and years. Largely this was because there were only two judges administering equitable principles, so from 1873 to 1875, the common law and equity courts were merged into one hierarchy. Under the Supreme Court of Judicature Act 1875, equitable principles would prevail in case of conflict. Third, in most counties and boroughs, the ability to vote for members of parliament had been tied to possession of property in land. From the Great Reform Act 1832, to the Reform Act 1867, and the Representation of the People Act 1918, the connection between property and the vote was gradually reduced and then abolished. Together with the Parliament Act 1911, a more democratic constitution had emerged, though it was only in 1928 that the voting age for men and women became equal and only in 1948 that the double votes and extra constituencies for students of the Universities of Oxford, Cambridge and London were removed. By the end of the First World War, the power of the old landed aristocracy had largely been broken.

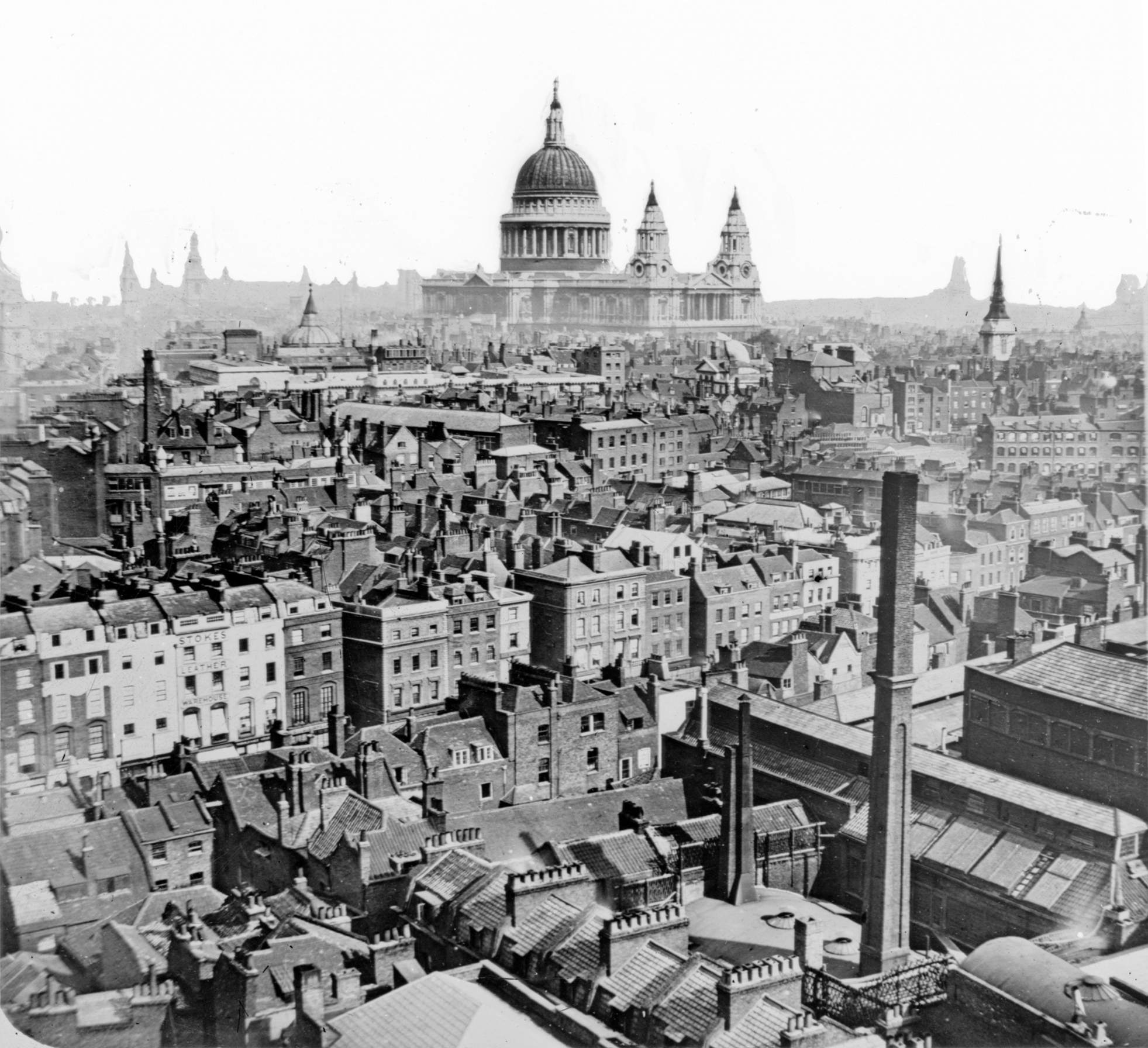
After both World Wars, land management and housing increasingly came under social ownership and regulation, with new council homes, rights for tenants, and ownership interests in land recognised through contributions to family life.

Over the twentieth century, land law became increasingly social in character. First, from the Housing, Town Planning, &c. Act 1919 and the post war government's policy of building "homes fit for heroes" more and more houses were built, and maintained, by local governments. In private accommodation, new rights were enacted for tenants against their landlords, with some security of tenure and rent regulation, a break on unfettered "freedom of contract". The policy was halted by the Housing Act 1980, which sought to privatise properties by introducing a "right to buy" one's council home. At the same time, rights for tenants, and constraints on rental increases were reduced, albeit that tenants did retain some minima of rights, for example under the Landlord and Tenant Act 1985 and the Protection from Eviction Act 1977. Second, property was increasingly used as a source of finance for business, and similarly became source of profit for banks, mortgage lenders and real estate investment trusts. This fact drove changes in the market for mortgage regulation, while the growing financial interest in land tended to conflict with family life. As the UK came closer to gender equality, women as much as men contributed to the purchase of homes, as well as contributing to raising families and children. In 1970, in Pettitt v Pettitt, Lord Diplock remarked that "the wider employment of married women in industry, commerce and the professions and the emergence of a property-owning, particularly a real-property-mortgaged-to-a-building-society-owning, democracy" had compelled courts to acknowledge contributions to the home and family life as potentially generating proprietary interests. However, if banks sought to repossess homes from people who had defaulted on mortgage repayments, the courts were faced with a choice of whether to prefer those economic interests over social values. The membership of the United Kingdom in the European Convention on Human Rights meant that article 8, on the right to a private and family life, could change the freedom of banks or landlords to evict people, particularly where children's stability and upbringing were at stake, though by the early twenty-first century the case law had remained cautious. Third, land use in general was subject to a comprehensive regulatory framework. The old common laws between neighbours, of easements, covenants, nuisance and trespass were largely eclipsed by locally and democratically determined planning laws, environmental regulation, and a framework for use of agricultural resources.

== Property rights and registration ==
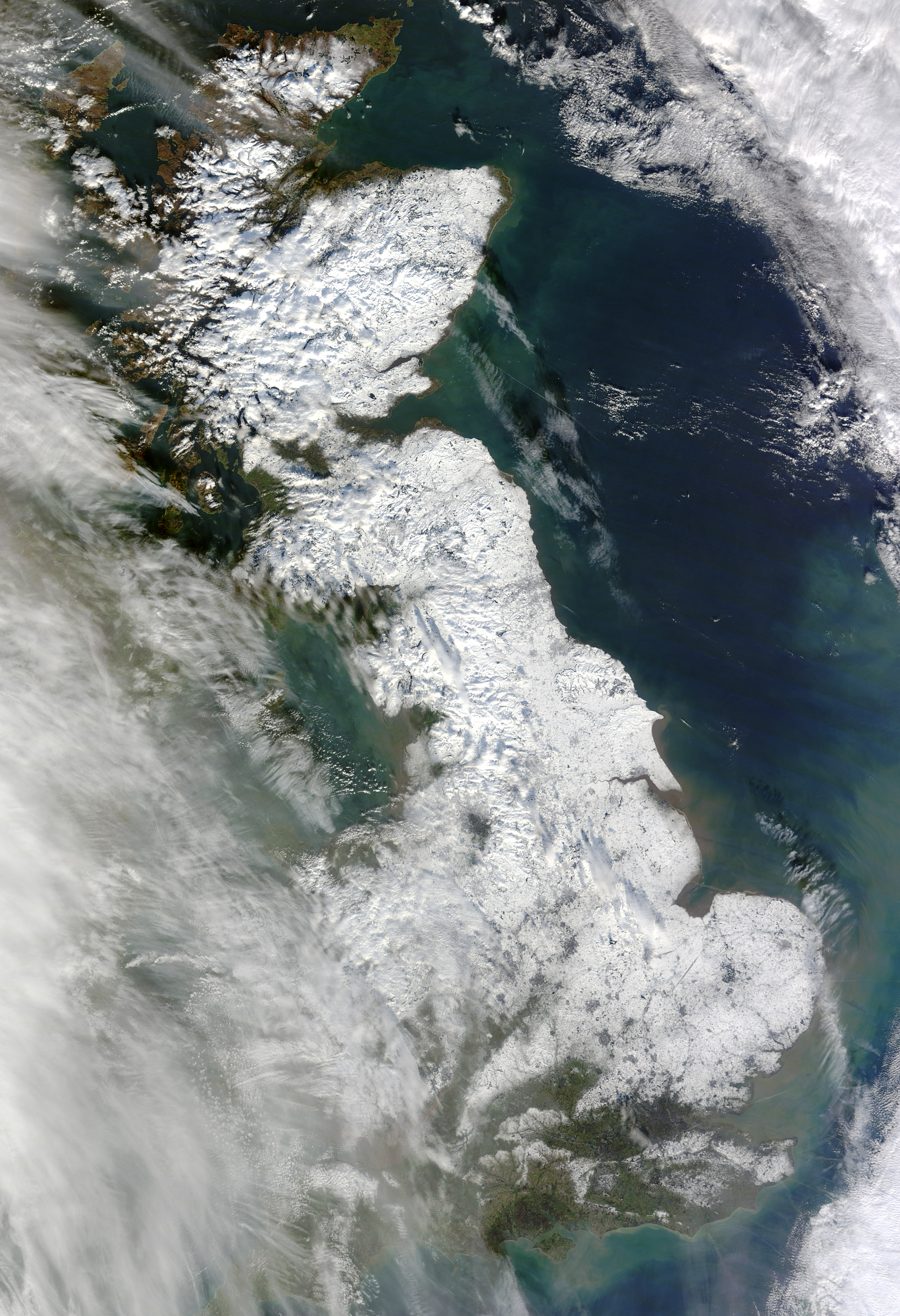
With 395 people per square kilometre, England has one of the highest population densities in Europe, and ranks 32nd worldwide. This would, however, leave up to 2,530 square metres per person if it were more equally distributed.

English land law draws on three main sources to determine property rights: the common law and equitable principles developed by the courts, a system of land registration and a continuing system for unregistered land. First of all, the courts of common law and equity gave people with "property" rights various privileges over people who acquired mere "personal" rights. To acquire property over land (as with any other object of value), as opposed to a contract, for example, to use it, a buyer and seller simply needed to agree that property would be passed. The law then recognised a "property" right with various privileges over people with purely "personal" claims. The best form of property would involve exclusive possession, and it usually bound anyone who attempted to interfere with an owner's use, particularly in cases of insolvency, if other people with interests in the land sold their stake to a third party, or in getting remedies to enforce one's right. Before 1925, property rights in land (unlike, for example, a company's shares) only had to be evidenced in paper title deeds. It was therefore believed that a system of land registration was desirable, so that people's rights over land would be certain, and conveyancing would be simpler and cheaper. So, the second system of land began with the Land Registration Act 1925, and the rules were recast in the Land Registration Act 2002. Instead of paper title deeds determining people's property rights in land, the entries in the registry were the source that determine people's property rights. However, many property rights were never expected to be registered, particularly the social claims that people had on family homes, or short leases. Furthermore, not all land had to be registered. Only when formal transactions with land took place did registration become a compulsory. This meant that by 2013, 88 per cent of land or 126,000 square kilometres was registered with HM Land Registry. But a third system of land regulation remained for the 12 per cent of unregistered land. Though somewhat amended by legislation, this system for determining property rights and disputes remained much like the old common law and equity.

=== Real property ===
Land law is also known as the law of real property. It relates to the acquisition, protection and conflicts of people's rights, legal and equitable, in land. This means three main things. First, "property rights" (in Latin, a right in rem) are generally said to bind third parties, whereas personal rights (a right in personam) are exercisable only against the person who owes an obligation. English law acknowledges a fixed number, or numerus clausus of property rights, which create various privileges. The main situations where this distinction matters are if a debtor to two or more creditors becomes insolvent. insolvent (i.e. bankrupt), or if there is a dispute over possession of a specific thing. If a person or a business has gone insolvent, and has things in their possession which are the property of others', then those people can usually take back their property free of anyone else's claims. But if an insolvent person's creditors are merely owed personal debts, they cannot take back their money freely: any losses have to be divided among all creditors. Often, creditors can contract for a proprietary right (known as a security interest) to secure repayment of debts. This gives the same result as having another proprietary right, so the secured creditor takes priority in the insolvency queue. Secured creditors, most usually, are banks and for most people the most familiar kind of security interest is a mortgage. In this way, property rights are always "stronger" than personal rights, even though they may be acquired by the same means: a contract. Most of the time, property rights are also stronger, too, because English courts have been historically more willing to order specific performance as a remedy for interference with property rights. People with personal rights, such as to the performance of a contract, are presumptively entitled to money in compensation, unless damages would be an inadequate remedy. In its second main feature, English land law differs from civil law systems in the European Union, because it allows the separation of the "beneficial" ownership of property from legal title to property. If there is a "trust" of land, then trustees hold legal title, while the benefit, use and "equitable" title might belong to many other people. Legal title to real property can only be acquired in a limited number of formal ways, while equitable title can be recognised because of a person's contribution, or the parties' true intentions, or some other reason, if the law deems that it is fair and just (i.e. equitable) to recognise that someone else has a stake in the land.

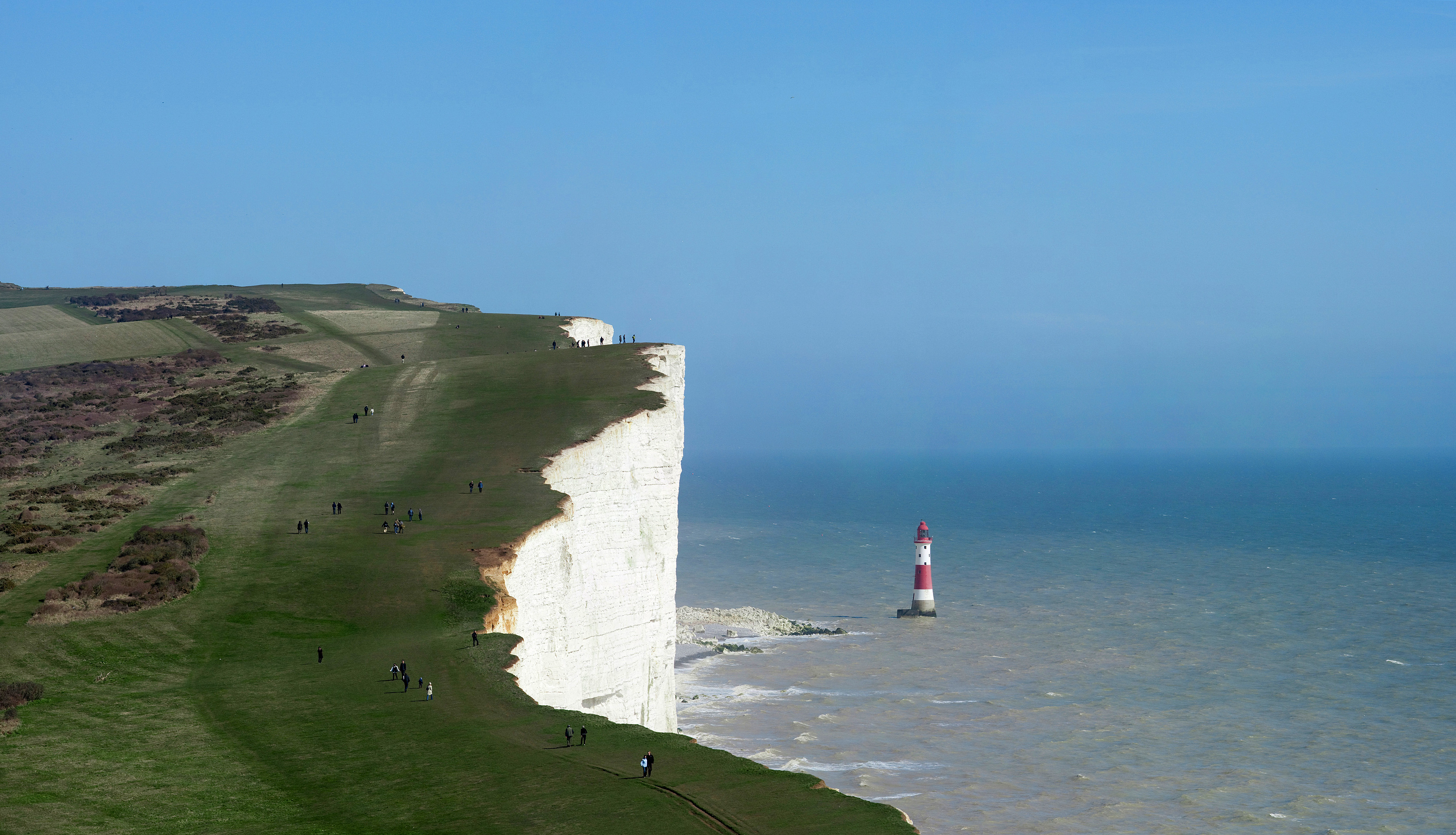
Land in English law is said to have "four dimensions", of area, into the sky and below the surface, and through time.

The third main feature of the English law of real property is that "real" property (or "realty") means land, and the things that goes with it, alone. This is classified as different from movables or other types of "personal" property (or "personalty"). The distinction matters mainly to define the scope of the subject matter, because there are different registration requirements, taxes, and other regulations for land's use. The technical definition of "land" encompasses slightly more than in the word's common use. Under the Law of Property Act 1925, section 205(1)(ix) says land means "land of any tenure, mines and minerals, whether or not held apart from the surface, buildings or parts of buildings (whether the division is horizontal, vertical or made in any other way) and other hereditaments; also a manor, advowson, and a rent and other incorporeal hereditaments, and an easement, right, privilege or benefit in, over, or derived from land..." This cumbersome definition indicates two general ideas. First, land includes physical things attached to it (e.g. buildings and "hereditaments") and, second, intangible rights (like an easement, a right of way). Perhaps in aspiration of appearing scientific, lawyers have become accustomed to describing property in land as being "four dimensional". The two dimensional area of land surface, bounded by a fence, is complemented by rights over all buildings and "fixtures". This becomes most relevant in disputes after a contract to sell land, when a buyer alleges a thing was included in a sale, but a contract was silent on the specifics. In Holland v Hodgson Blackburn J held that looms installed in a factory formed part of the land. Objects resting on the ground and "attached" only by gravity will not normally be part of the land, although it could be that the parties "intended" something different, or rather what the parties' reasonable expectations were. Easily removable things, like carpets and curtains, or houseboats, will not be land, but less easily removed things, like taps and plugs are. In the third dimension, as section 205(1)(ix) points out, mines and sub-surface things, belong to the surface owner, and up to a general limit of 500 feet, the landowner will have a right to the atmosphere above his land as well. Public policy sets the limit in both cases, so since the 16th century Case of Mines the Crown has a claim to valuable minerals or natural resources that are discovered, as well as valuable treasure. And in the other direction, aircraft or satellites that are sufficiently high are not considered to trespass, or infringe an owner's right to peaceful enjoyment. The fourth dimension of land to an English property lawyer, is time. Since 1925 English law recognises two "estates" in land, or kinds of ownership interest: the "fee simple", which is a right to use for an unlimited time, and a "lease", which is an interest for a fixed period of time. In all situations, however, use of the land is constrained by agreements or binding rights with neighbours, and the requirements of the local council and government.

=== Land registration and priority ===
Because land can serve multiple uses, for many people, and because its fixed nature means that its owner may not always be visible, a system of registration came to be seen as essential at the start of the 20th century. From the Land Registry Act 1862 which created a body where people could voluntarily register, a succession of government reports and piecemeal reform finally culminated in a unified, compulsory registration system with the Land Registration Act 1925. Its proponents argued that a registration system would increase land's marketability, and make its transfer as fluid as the registration system of company shares. Theodore Ruoff, Chief Registrar from 1963, said the main three functions the register served was (1) to mirror ownership interests in land (2) to curtain off minor, or equitable interests that could be bypassed (or "overreached") in the land conveyance business, and (3) to provide insurance through Registrar funds to anyone who lost property as a result of register defects. The ideal goal was thus to ensure that a comprehensive set of people whose interests had priority in a given real estate would be reflected on the register. With the Land Registration Act 2002, which recast the old law, the Registry has focused on "e-conveyancing". Under sections 91 to 95, electronic registration counts as deeds, and aims to replace the paper filing for the 21st century.

HM Land Registry does not require interests acquired through informal methods to be recorded, which usually reflect social and family interests in property.

However, reflecting the social use of land, the priority system of land registration and the Register's record of all interests in land has made significant exceptions for informal methods of acquiring rights, and especially equitable interests, in land. Under the Land Registration Act 2002 sections 27 to 30, an interest in land that is registered (for instance, freehold ownership, a long lease, or a mortgage) will take priority to all other interests that come later, or are not entered on the register. The first registered interest in time prevails. Yet under LRA 2002 Schedule 3, a series of exceptions, or "overriding interests" are listed. Under Schedule 3, paragraph 1, any lease that is less than seven years need not be registered, and will still bind other parties. The reason is to strike a balance between an owner who may well keep hold of land for a long period, and a person who may be renting as a home. Most socially significant, under Schedule 3, paragraph 2 (formerly Land Registration Act 1925 s 70(1)(g)), the interest of a person who is in "actual occupation" need not be entered on the register, but will still bind later registered interests. This rule was said to be necessary to prevent the social right to a home being "lost in the welter of registration". It is most used in favour of people, typically a spouse in a family home whose name is not on the title deeds, who have not registered an interest because the law has recognised they have acquired a right, not through a formal, or express contract, or gift – but by their contributions, or their reliance on another person's assurances. If such a person is in "actual occupation", then their informally acquired interest (usually through "constructive trust", which recognises their contributions of money or work toward family life) will bind parties who acquire interests later on.

"Anyone who lends money on the security of a matrimonial home nowadays ought to realise that the wife may have a share in it. He ought to make sure that the wife agrees to it, or to go to the house and make inquiries of her. It seems to me utterly wrong that a lender should turn a blind eye to the wife's interest or the possibility of it – and afterwards seek to turn her and the family out – on the plea that he did not know she was in actual occupation. If a bank is to do its duty, in the society in which we live, it should recognise the integrity of the matrimonial home. It should not destroy it by disregarding the wife's interest in it – simply to ensure that it is paid the husband's debt in full – with the high interest rate now prevailing. We should not give monied might priority over social justice."

— Lord Denning MR in Williams & Glyn's Bank v Boland [1979] Ch 312

In a leading case, Williams & Glyn's Bank v Boland Mr Boland had had trouble repaying his bank for a loan he used on his building company. The loan was secured on his Beddington house, where he lived with Mrs Boland. However, Mrs Boland had not consented to the mortgage agreement. She was not registered on the home's title deeds, but she had made significant financial contributions to the home. Despite Templeman J at first instance saying Mrs Boland only occupied the house through her husband, the Court of Appeal, and the House of Lords both agreed that Mrs Boland actually did occupy her home, and that her interest bound the bank. Later cases have shown the test for actual occupation must be purposively, and liberally determined, according to the claimant's social circumstance. So in Chhokar v Chhokar a lady who had been beaten and attacked by her estranged husband's friends to scare her from her Southall home, and who was at the time of her home being registered in hospital having Mr Chhokar's child, was still in actual occupation. This meant that because she had contributed to the home's purchase price, she was entitled to stay. Her interest bound, and took priority to, later registered interests. Under LRA 2002 Schedule 3, paragraph 2, only if a person is asked about their interest, and they say nothing, or if it is not obvious on a reasonably careful inspection, would a person in actual occupation lose to a registered party. It has also been held that someone who occupies a house and has an interest in the home might have impliedly consented to taking subject to another party's later interest. In both Bristol & West Building Society v Henning and Abbey National Building Society v Cann a couple purchased a home with the assistance of a loan from a building society, which was secured by mortgage on the property. In both cases the court held that because the buyers could not have got the house without the loan, there had been tacit consent by all to the bank taking priority, and no gap in time before registration when the spouse could have been said to be in prior actual occupancy.

Originally to facilitate transfers of land, the Law of Property Act 1925 sections 2 and 27 make provision so that people with equitable interests in land may not assert them against purchasers of the land if there are two trustees. If a person has an equitable interest in a property, the law allows this interest to be detached from the property, or "overreached" and reattached to money given in exchange for land, so long as the exchange took place by at least two trustees. This was, however, applied not for the purpose of trading property by professional trustees, but against homeowners in City of London Building Society v Flegg. Here two parents, Mr and Mrs Flegg, had given their home to their children, who in turn mortgaged the property and defaulted on the loan. The House of Lords held that because the words of the statute were fulfilled, and the purchase money for the interest in the property (i.e. the loan that the children squandered) had been paid to two trustees, the Fleggs had to give up possession. Lastly, it is possible to lose an interest in land if unregistered through adverse possession by another person after 12 years under the Limitation Act 1980 sections 15 to 17. Ownership of registered property can be lost if an adverse possessor (a squatter) can prove unauthorised, exclusive, and continuous usage of the property for ten years, but LRA 2002 does impose a further burden: the Land Registry will contact interested parties who can then delay the process for two years and attempt a legal eviction via a trespass charge. Consequently, potential adverse possessors might be best advised to avoid making the application until the owner is untraceable.

=== Unregistered land ===
In 2019, because registration of title was never made compulsory per se, 14 per cent of land in England and Wales remained unregistered. The absence of compulsion was probably a result of political compromise, while a powerful landed aristocracy remained heavily opposed to any transparency over the extent of their wealth. Only if a transaction identified in the Land Registration Act 2002 section 4 took place, as under the LRA 1925, would the land be compulsorily entered on the register. This included any sale, mortgage, or lease over seven years. However it still does not include a transfer by operation of law, and that means land can be inherited, or kept within the family, and never need be registered unless the Lord Chancellor amends section 4 by order. It means that to find the "root of title" to unregistered property, and the various rights that others might have such as easements or covenants, it is necessary to seek out the relevant bundle of deeds, going back at least 15 years. If unregistered property is being sold on, registration would be triggered, but a final search of title deeds would still be necessary. The first basic principle was that all legal property rights bound everyone, whether or not anybody knew about them. These would usually be in the deeds that were kept, though small interests like a lease of under three years would not because of its exemption from formality, as with registered land. The second principle was that equitable proprietary rights bound everyone except a bona fide purchaser of the legal estate without any notice of the equitable interest (also known as Equity's Darling). Being a bona fide purchaser was an "absolute, unqualified, unanswerable defence", so that the person with an equitable interest would only have an enforceable right against the traceable assets received in return for the land. Being a purchaser for value meant not receiving the property as a gift, and bona fide meant acting in good faith. In turn, good faith largely meant the same thing as buying the land without having any actual notice, and it not being reasonable to have known, about another person's equitable interest. According to the Law of Property Act 1925 section 199, and cases through the courts, buyers of land would be bound by prior equitable interests if the interest "would have come to his knowledge if such inquiries and inspections had been made as ought reasonably to have been made". So for example, in Kingsnorth Finance Co Ltd v Tizard, it was held that clothes of a divorcee being present in a home bound a bank's agent who inspected a property with notice of her equitable interest. The general scheme of the law was to do everything possible to ensure that people were not deprived of their stakes in their homes without their fully informed and true consent, yet it stopped short of simply determining that equitable rights were always binding.

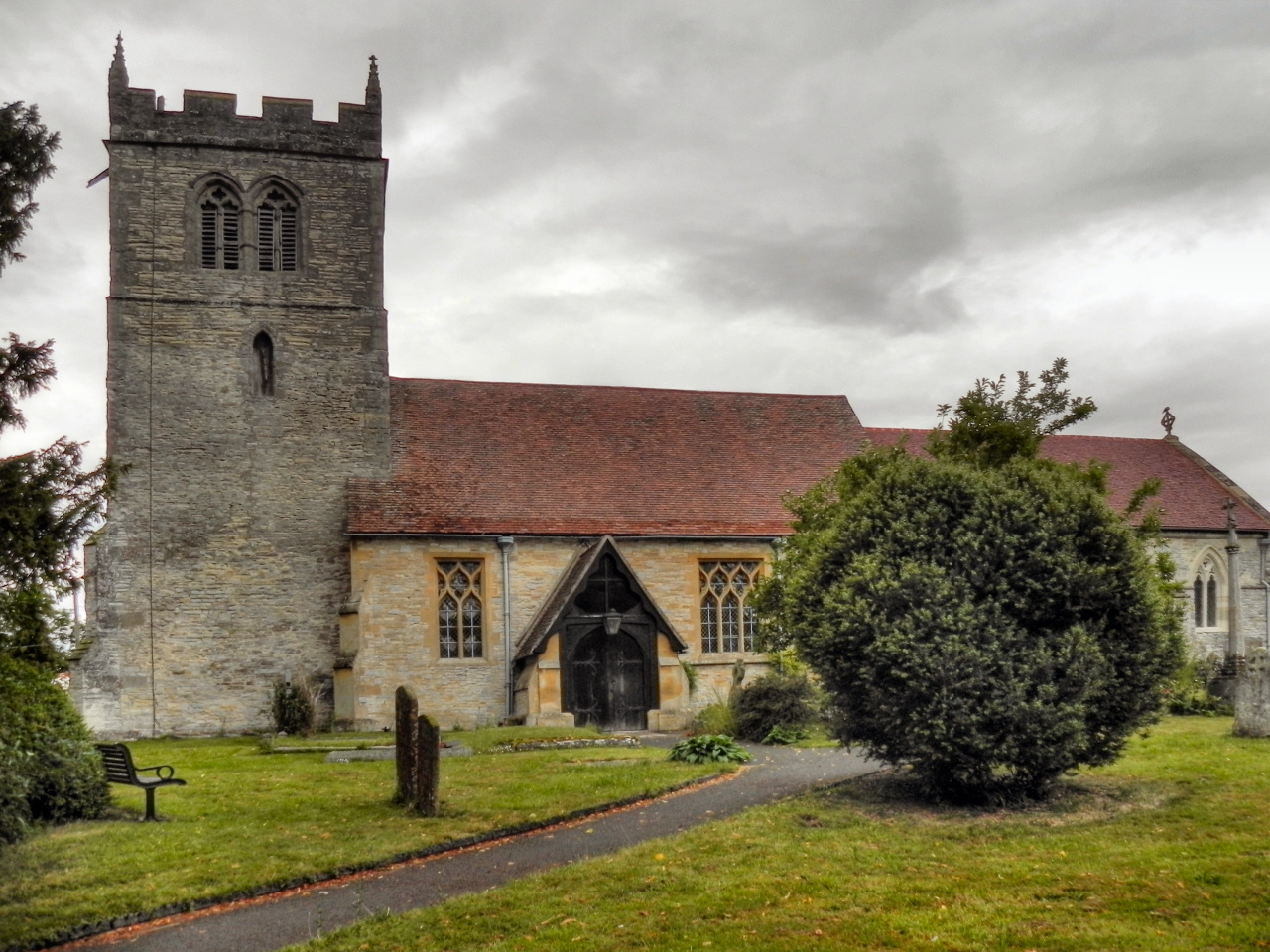
The Chancel Repairs Act 1932, requiring contributions for local church repairs, accelerated land registration because it always takes effect against unregistered land, but only with a notice on registered land after 2013. It was held compatible with the ECHR in Parish of Aston Cantlow v Wallbank.

On top of these basic rules, the Land Charges Act 1972, following its 1925 predecessor, required that some kinds of charges had to be entered on another special register of charges for unregistered land. According to section 2, a puisne mortgage (a second or third mortgage created after a property is already mortgaged) had to be registered before it would be binding, even though it had previously counted as a legal property right. The other important kinds of charge that had to be registered are restrictive covenants and equitable easements, a right from the Family Law Act 1996 Part IV, and an "estate contract" (i.e. either a future right to buy a property, or an option to buy). Without registration, those charges would be void, but once registered those charges would bind everyone. The registration would go against the name of the title holder, although this was sometimes prone to confusion if people occasionally used different names (e.g. Francis or Frank). If an official search of the register did not reveal any titles, then the purchaser would gain good legal rights. One glaring injustice, however, was that the House of Lords held the registration rules to be strict. In Midland Bank Trust Co Ltd v Green, Walter Green gave his son, Geoffrey an option to buy the property, but did not register it. Then Walter changed his mind, and knowing that Geoffrey had not registered this estate contract, he transferred the property to his wife, Evelyne, for £500 to defeat the agreement. Although the purchaser had actual notice of Geoffrey's equitable interest, it did not matter because it was not registered. In another example, it was held in Lloyds Bank v Carrick that a person in actual occupation of a home, who had an unregistered right to buy the home, could not claim an over-riding interest (as would have been possible in registered land) because the only source of the interest was the estate contract, and without registration this was void. The anomalies of the system were always acknowledged, and so it was simply hoped that unregistered land would dwindle away. The solution, perhaps simpler, of passing legislation requiring everything was compulsorily registered was not yet taken.

=== Human rights ===
Although the United Kingdom constitutional law formally follows the idea of Parliamentary sovereignty, following the Second World War the UK joined the United Nations, it subscribed to the European Convention on Human Rights (which was largely written by UK civil servants), and in 1972 it joined the European Union then left in 2020. In all three international organisations, the constitutional traditions of other member states gave courts a greater role in adjudicating on whether legislation complied with human rights. With the Human Rights Act 1998, the UK resolved to give its courts power to review legislation's compliance with the ECHR jurisprudence, primarily as a way of saving litigants the cost of exhausting the domestic court system and then appealing to Strasbourg. The ECHR was relevant for land law mostly because of the right to a privacy and family life under ECHR article 8, and the right to peaceful enjoyment of possessions under ECHR Protocol 1, article 1 are concerned. In the first cases under ECHR article 8, challenges were brought by tenants who had been evicted from their homes by local authorities. Against the arguments of claimants that their evictions were disproportionate responses and infringed their rights to a family or home life, the UK courts initially denied that UK property legislation would ever be incompatible with the Convention. However, in Manchester CC v Pinnock, after a number of cases in the European Court of Human Rights suggested otherwise, the UK Supreme Court accepted that courts must have the inherent jurisdiction to assess whether an infringement of one's right to a home life if someone is evicted is proportionate and justifiable. On the case's facts, it was held that Mr Pinnock's eviction for the anti-social behaviour of his sons was proportionate. Although he was a pensioner, the complaints had been serious and long lasting. The cases under Protocol 1, article 1, primarily turn on the question of compulsory acquisition of property by the government. The Strasbourg courts distinguish between deprivation of property by actual acquisition, and limitation of the use of land by an owner through regulation, for instance of the environment.

== Acquiring land ==
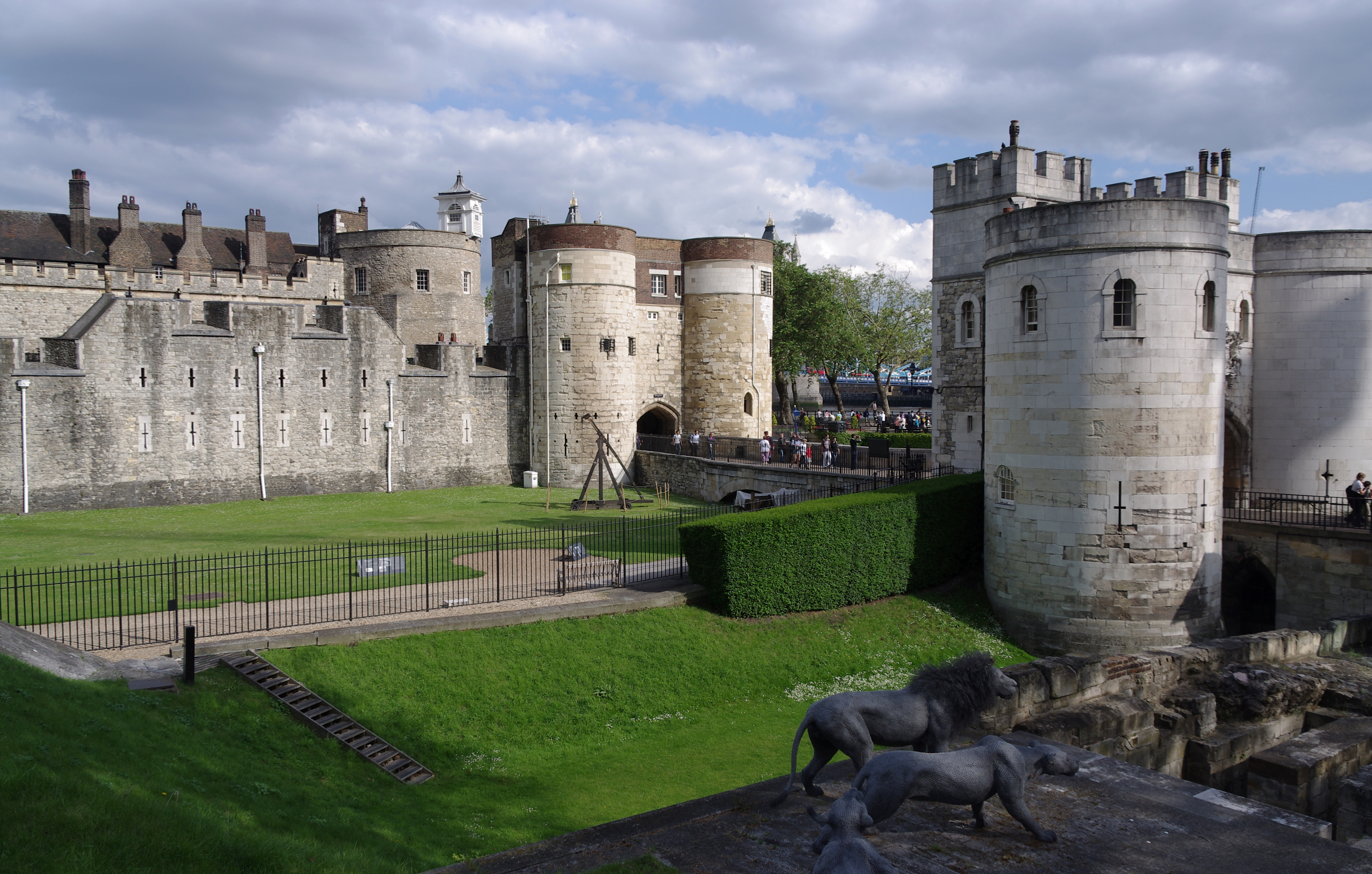
Titles to large amount of England descend from people who acquired land through the monarchy after the Norman Invasion, and were protected by the Crown's military establishments like the Tower of London.

While the establishment of the land law in England happened by invasion, conquest, enclosure and force, over the 20th century as a whole there was an increasing distribution of property ownership. The great driver for increasing distribution of land, and the British realisation of the right to housing, was public regulation of rental prices (so being a landlord was less profitable than selling) and publicly financed construction of housing. Otherwise there have been four other methods for acquiring rights in land, which operate within the paradigm of markets and private property. The first is through a consent based obligation. This could be through a gift, or similarly the settlement of a trust, so that a trustee holds property for the benefit of another. Most normally land will be transferred through an agreement by contract. In all cases, to complete a transfer, a person's interest should be registered to be fully protected. However, the law recognises people's interests in land even though they have not been acquired in a formal way. The second main way to acquire rights in land is through resulting or constructive trust, recognised by the court. In the context of land, and particularly family homes, this will usually be to acknowledge the contribution someone has made to a home, financial or otherwise. Third, the courts acknowledge people have acquired land when they have been given an assurance, on which they have reasonably placed reliance, and the result would be detrimental if their interests were not recognised. This proprietary estoppel claim is a way for people's interests to gain recognition although their dealing's with a land owner have fallen short of contract. Fourth, and the furthest departure from land acquired by a contract, English law has always recognised a claim by people who have inhabited land for long enough to have legally acquired their rights. The fact of possession, even if adverse to a previous owner, matures after 12 years into a sound legal right.

=== Consent, form and registration ===
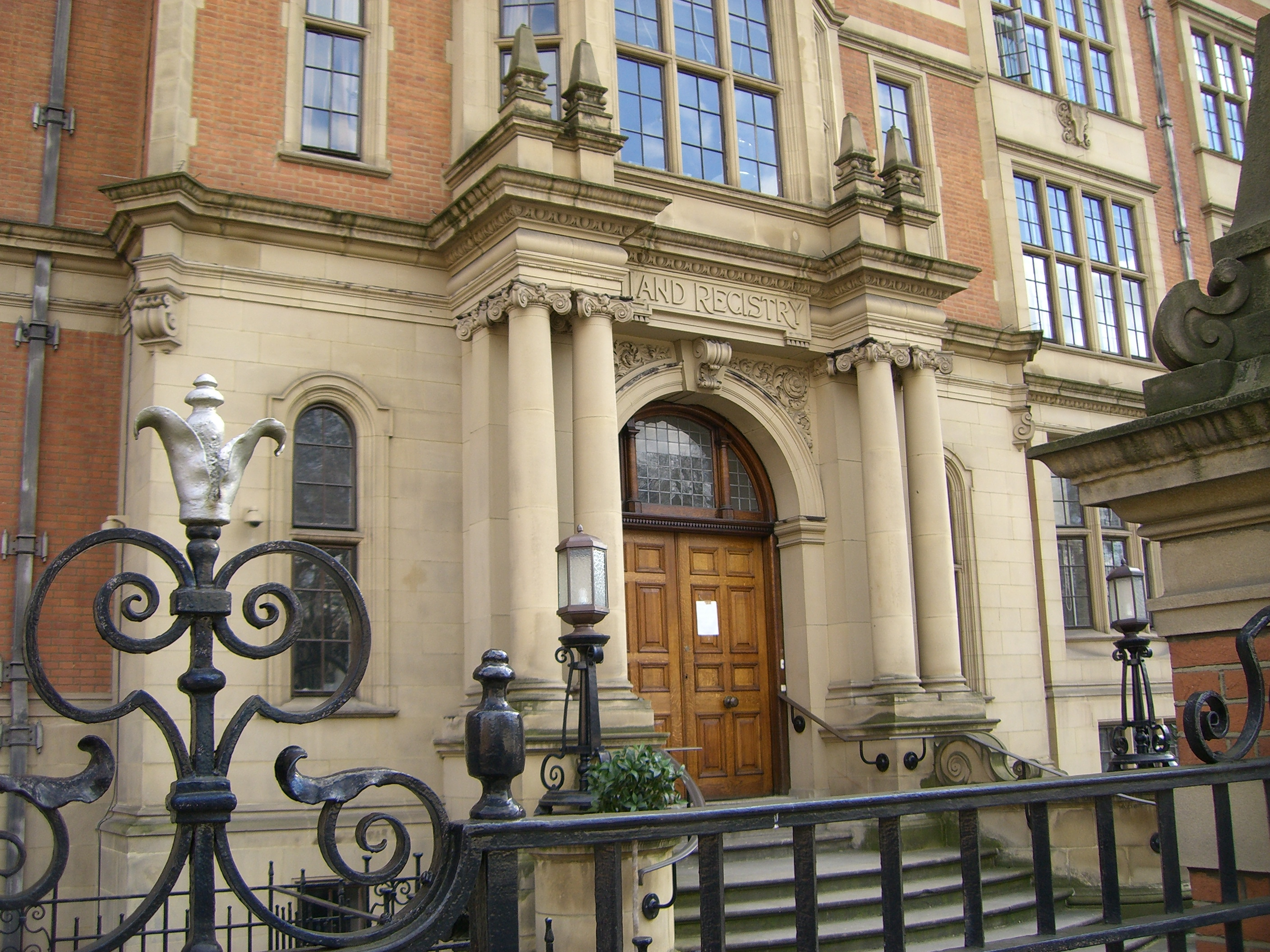
Headquarters of HM Land Registry, 32 Lincoln's Inn Fields from 1913 to 2011, now the LSE's Department of Economics

Four main ways of acquiring land are through a gift, trust, succession and by contract, all of which involve express or at least presumed consent. In the case of an ordinary gift during a person's life, the Law of Property Act 1925 section 52(1) requires a deed (itself defined in the Law of Property (Miscellaneous Provisions) Act 1989 section 1) before any transfer is effective. Subsequently, a transfer must be registered. The Land Registration Act 2002 section 27(2) makes registration compulsory for all transfers of land, leases over seven years and any charges. Under LRA 2002 section 27, the consequence of a failure to register one's interest is that it will not bind another person in law who is transferred the property and does register. If the transfer of land takes place through a will, the Wills Act 1837 section 9 requires in similar terms that the will be signed in writing and have two witnesses. The beneficiary under the will must then take steps to register the interest in land in her name. In the case of a person who dies without leaving a will, their property, including land will succeed in passing by operation of law to the next of kin, or in the case of jointly owned property in a joint tenancy, to the co-owner/s.

In all situations, the requirement of formality is thought to improve the quality of people's consent. It has been reasoned, most notably by Lon Fuller, that going through the laborious motions of formality induces people to truly consider whether they wish to make a transfer. It also provides evidence of the transaction, and makes the threshold of a transaction's enforceability simple to determine. This is most seen in the case of a contract. If an interest in land is the subject of a contract, the law isolates three steps. First, the sale will take place, which according to LPMPA 1989 section 2 may only occur with signed writing (though by section 2(5) and Law of Property Act 1925 section 54(2) leases under 3 years can be made without). Second, technically the transfer must take place under Law of Property Act 1925 section 52(1) by a deed (though there is no reason why this cannot be combined with step 1, by using a deed for the sale!). Third, the land must be registered for the legal interest to take effect under LRA 2002 sections 27 to 30.

=== Resulting and constructive trusts ===
Although the formal steps of a contract, conveyance and registration will allow people to acquire legal interests in land, over the course of the twentieth century Parliament, and the courts, slowly recognised that many people have legitimate claims to property, even without following formalities, and even without gaining the consent of a property owner. The institution of a trust has come to play a major role, particularly in family homes, because according to the Law of Property Act 1925 section 53, while declarations of express trusts require signed writing to take effect, resulting and constructive trusts do not. A "resulting" trust is typically recognised when a person has given property to a person without the intention to benefit that person, so the property jumps back to the person it came from. "Constructive" trusts have been recognised by English courts in about eight unrelated circumstances, whenever it is said it would be "unconscionable" that the courts did not recognise properly belonged to the claimant. In the context of family homes, these two types of trust allowed judges to recognise, from around 1970, a spouse's proprietary right in a home because of the contribution (broadly speaking) to home life. Parliament had enacted the same reform already as a part of family law. In the Matrimonial Proceedings and Property Act 1970 section 37, "where a husband or wife contributes in money or money's worth" to improve property, a court could recognise an equitable right in it, but also vary the amount to the extent it was deemed just. And under the Matrimonial Causes Act 1973 section 24, a court was empowered in divorce proceedings to vary the property rights of the parties, especially for the benefit of children, to the extent that was just. In the Civil Partnership Act 2004 sections 65 to 72 and Schedules 5–7 achieved the same for civil partners.

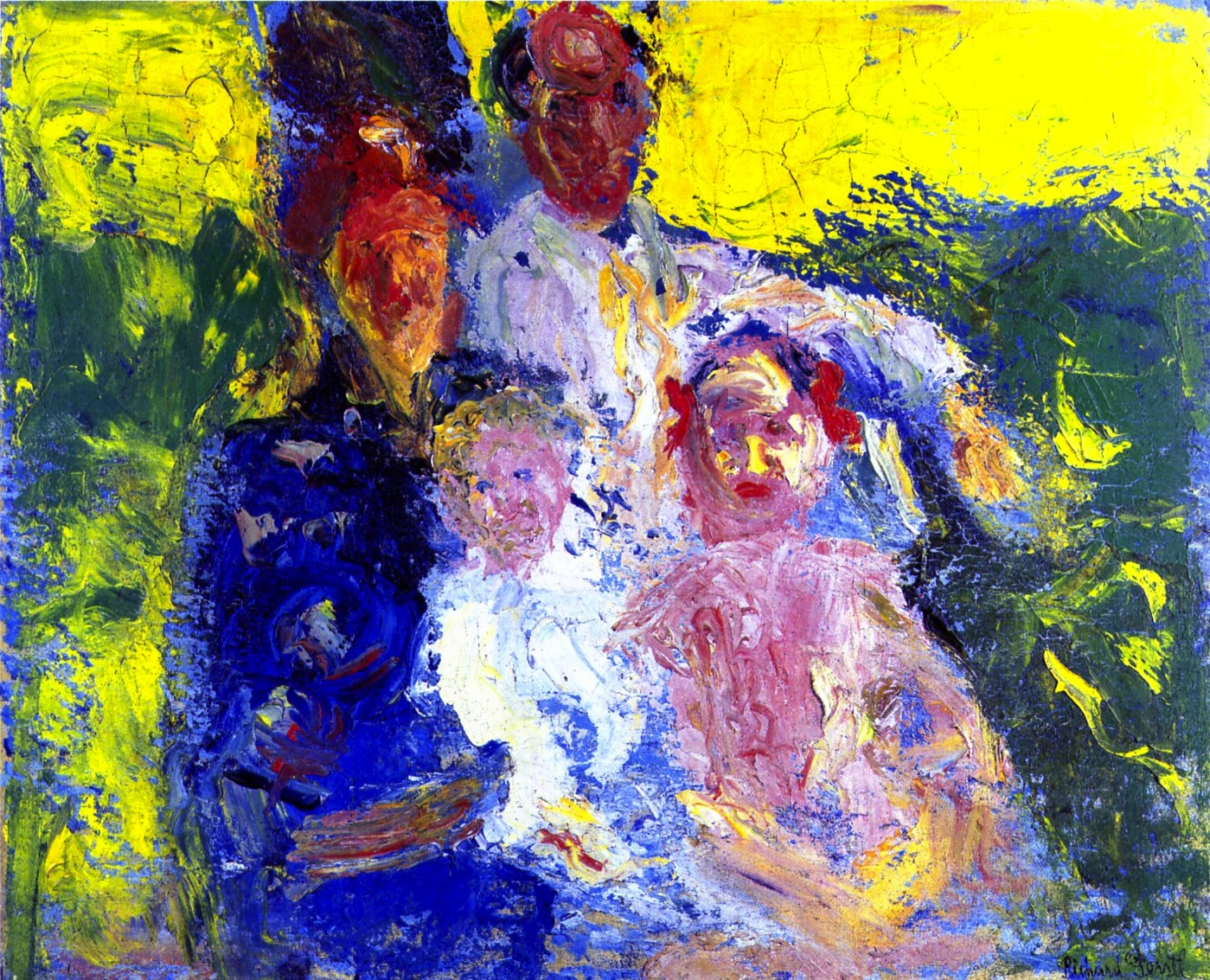
Among British families in 2001 there were 10m married couples with 7.5m children, and 2m unmarried cohabiting couples with 1.25m children (painting by Richard Gerstl).

However, for cohabiting couples, with or without children, who are not married or civil partners, only the common law was available to make a claim, and it has been slow to reach a position achieved for married couples under statute. In Gissing v Gissing, a case before the passage of the family law statutes, a married couple had lived, worked and had a child together from 1935 to 1961 when the relationship broke down on his adultery. Mr Gissing had paid mortgage instalments and the property was in his name, although Mrs Gissing had made some home improvements. Lord Denning MR in the Court of Appeal held that because they had continued life as a joint venture, even though she had made no quantifiable money contribution, nevertheless Mrs Gissing would have a half share in the property under a constructive trust. The House of Lords reversed this decision, arguing that no "common intention" could be found, as was said to be needed, for her to share in the home's equity. Despite this, some cases creatively allowed for a constructive trust on the basis of "common intention" if unusual conduct was arguably evidence of wanting to share the home. In Eves v Eves, the Court of Appeal (with Lord Denning MR) held that a lady who broke up a patio with a 14 lb sledgehammer must have been intended to share in the home's equity. In Grant v Edwards, the Court of Appeal allowed a claim by Ms Grant who was explicitly told by her partner, Mr Edwards, that she could not be included on the house title deeds because it could affect her chances of a divorce proceedings. This was, said the court, apparently evidence that (if Ms Grant had had no divorce proceedings) the couple must have intended to share the house together. However, then in Lloyds Bank plc v Rosset the House of Lords halted development again. Lord Bridge held that only if (1) a spouse made direct contributions to a home's purchase price, or (2) a spouse had actually reached some agreement, however uncertain, that a claim for an equitable interest would succeed. This meant that Mrs Rosset, who was not on the title deeds, had made no financial contributions, but who had done much decorating work, could not claim an equitable interest in the home where she lived. This meant that the bank was entitled to repossess the home, following a default on Mr Rosset's mortgage loan, free from her interest in actual occupation. Nevertheless, if a court did acknowledge a spouse's contribution to the home, it could "inflate" the interest to whatever size possible (as under the 1970 and 1973 Acts). So in Midland Bank plc v Cooke the Court of Appeal held that although a joint gift of £1100 to Mr and Mrs Cooke only represented 6% of the home's value, Mrs Cooke's interest could be raised to one half. This meant that Midland Bank was entitled only to half the equity value of the home after Mr Cooke defaulted on a loan with them.

The most recent set of cases appear, however, to have moved further. In Stack v Dowden a couple with four children who lived together for 18 years had registered a house in both their names. However, Ms Dowden had contributed more money. She claimed that the presumption of equal ownership should be displaced and that she should therefore have a share that was greater than half, and the House of Lords agreed that she owned 65% of the beneficial interest. Although not concerning the same point, Lord Walker noted that the law since Lord Bridge's decision in Lloyds Bank plc v Rosset "has moved on", regarding the question of what matters in quantifying people's shares in a home. The majority also remarked that in family situations, constructive trusts provided more utility where the court had greater flexibility to quantify people's interests free from tangible financial contributions, and that resulting trusts were more appropriate to commercial relationships, where the quantification of a person's interest would more match financial contributions. Furthermore, in Kernott v Jones, Ms Jones and Mr Kernott had had two children and were both on the registered title. However, from 1993 to 2008, Mr Kernott had moved out, and Ms Jones was raising the children, paying the mortgage and the house expenses. In TLATA 1996 section 14 proceedings, Court of Appeal upheld his claim for 50% of the property, arguing that with absolutely no evidence of any intention otherwise, it could not be the courts' role to "impute" the intentions of the parties. The Supreme Court reversed this, finding that Ms Jones did indeed own 90% of the home's equity, and this could readily be inferred from all the circumstances. In the Privy Council, in Abbott v Abbott Baroness Hale more squarely affirmed that the "parties' whole course of conduct in relation to the property must be taken into account in determining their shared intentions as to its ownership." However, it still remains unclear to what extent (and why) the law on cohabiting couples, after four decades, remains different from that for married couples under the 1970 and 1973 Acts.

=== Proprietary estoppel ===
Proprietary estoppel is the third principal mechanism to acquire rights over property, seen particularly in the case of land. Unlike a contract or gift, which depend on consent, or resulting and constructive trusts that depend primarily on the fact of contribution, a proprietary estoppel arises when a person has been given a clear assurance, it was reasonable of them to rely on the assurance, and they have acted to their detriment. This threefold pattern of proprietary estoppel (clear assurance, reasonable reliance and substantial detriment) makes it consistent with its partner in the law of obligations, "promissory estoppel". Although English law has not yet recognised promissory estoppel as giving rise to a cause of action (as has been done under the American Restatement (Second) of Contracts §90), in Cobbe v Yeoman's Row Management Ltd Lord Scott remarked that proprietary estoppel should be seen as a sub-species of promissory estoppel. In all cases it allows people who act on others' assurances about legal rights, even without them attaining express agreement. For example, in Dillwyn v Llewelyn, a son was held to have acquired a house from his father because he was given a written notice that he would, despite never having completed a deed for conveyance, after the son spent time and money improving the property. And in Crabb v Arun DC a farmer acquired the right to a path over the council's land, because they had assured him that if he sold off one portion an access point would remain. In all cases, the minimum pattern of an assurance, reliance and some form of detriment is present.

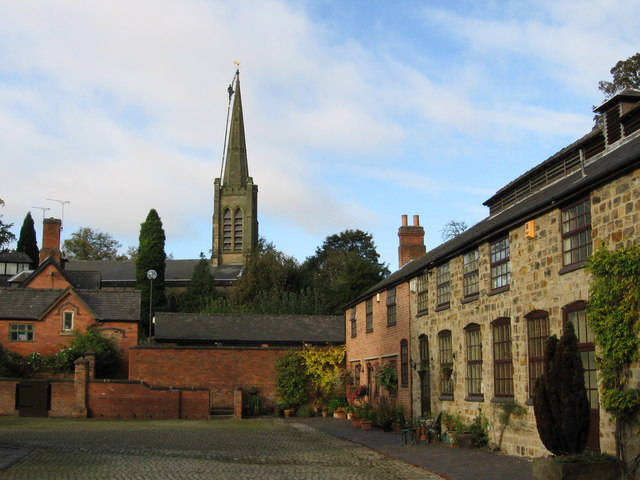
In Greasley v Cooke, over a house in Riddings, the Court of Appeal affirmed that once an assurance is found, the burden of proof is on the defendant to show that it was not relied up to the claimant's detriment.

Proprietary estoppel case law has, however, divided on the question of what kind of assurance and what kind of reliance must be present. In Cobbe v Yeoman's Row Management Ltd, a property developer claimed an interest in a group of Knightsbridge flats after his expense in obtaining council planning permission. Mr Cobbe had made an oral agreement with the flat owner, Mrs Lisle-Mainwaring, to get the flats at £12m, but once permission was obtained, the owner broke her oral promise. Even so, in the House of Lords Mr Cobbe failed in his claim for anything more than the expense (£150,000) of getting the planning, because in this commercial context it was clear that formal deeds were needed for completion of any deal. By contrast, in Thorner v Majors, David (a second cousin) worked on Peter's farm for 30 years and believed he would inherit it. This probably was intended but after Peter fell out with other relatives, he destroyed his will, leaving David with nothing. Even though no specific assurance, and only some vague conduct indicating an assurance, was present, the House of Lords held that David had a good proprietary estoppel claim. Lord Hoffmann remarked that if a reasonable person could understand, however oblique and allusive, that an assurance was given, a legal right would accrue. The tendency of the cases is therefore to recognise claims more in the domestic context, which less formal assurances are common, and less so in the commercial context, where formality is normal.

A difficult issue, however, in awarding a remedy for estoppel is that unlike a contract it is not always apparent that a claimant should receive the full measure of what they had expected. By contrast, the factual pattern of estoppels, which often appear something very close to a contract, often seem to warrant more than an award for damages to compensate claimants for the amount of detriment, or loss, as in a tort case. In Jennings v Rice, Robert Walker LJ tackled the issue by emphasising that the purpose of the court's jurisdiction was to avoid an unconscionable result, and to ensure that a remedy was based on proportionality. Here, Mr Jennings had worked as a gardener for a Mrs Royle since the 1970s, but the administrator of her estate had no will. Mr Jennings had been told he "would be alright" and more so that "this will all be yours one day". The Court of Appeal resolved, however, that not the full estate, worth £1.285m, but only £200,000 would be awarded in view of the actual detriment incurred by Mr Jennings and the uncertainty of what his assurances really meant. In relation to third parties, the remedy for proprietary estoppel has been confirmed to bind others by the Land Registration Act 2002 section 116.

=== Compulsory purchase ===
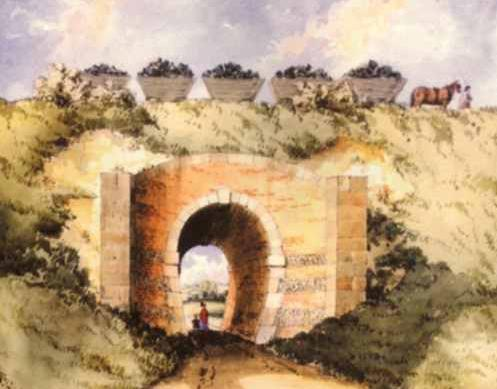
After the enclosure movement, the Surrey Railways Act 1801 (41 Geo. 3. (UK). c. xxxiii) used compulsory purchase to build the Surrey Iron Railway. Courts since have fought over the extent to which eminent domain is used for the public good.

Although land may be acquired by consent, and conduct which raises another party's reasonable expectations, these private methods of acquiring land are often insufficient for adequate public regulation. Building national infrastructure, such as railways, housing, and sewerage, as well as democratically determined planning rules, either by national or local government, typically requires compulsory purchase, because private owners might not give up land required for public works except at an extortionate price. Historically, compulsory purchases were carried out under the inclosure acts and their predecessors, where enclosure of common land was frequently a method of expropriating people from common land for the benefit of barons and landlords. In the Industrial Revolution, most railways were built by private companies procuring compulsory purchase rights from private acts of Parliament, though by the late 19th century, powers of compulsory purchase slowly became more transparent and used for general social welfare, as with the Public Health Act 1875, or the Housing of the Working Classes Act 1885. Compulsory purchase legislation was significantly extended during World War I for military use, and after the war for housing, as certain principles became standardised. Today, the Land Compensation Act 1961 section 5 generally requires that the owner of an interest in land (e.g. a freehold, leasehold or easement as in Re Ellenborough Park) receives payment for the "value of the land... if sold on an open market by a willing seller". Compensation is often also available for losses to a home, or if one's business has to move. In turn the Compulsory Purchase Act 1965 set conditions for a purchase to be made, and the Acquisition of Land Act 1981 regulates the conditions for granting a "compulsory purchase order". Typically, either central government represented by a Secretary of State, or a local council will be interested in making a compulsory purchase. The authority of local councils for make purchases for specific reasons can be set out in specific legislation, such as the Highways Act 1980 to build roads when strictly necessary. However the Town and Country Planning Act 1990 section 226, which allows compulsory purchase to "facilitate the carrying out of development, re-development or improvement" for the area's economic, social, or environmental well being, must be confirmed by the Secretary of State, and similarly the Local Government Act 1972 section 121 requires the council seek approval from the government Minister, a time-consuming process which prevents compulsory purchase being carried out without co-ordination in central government.

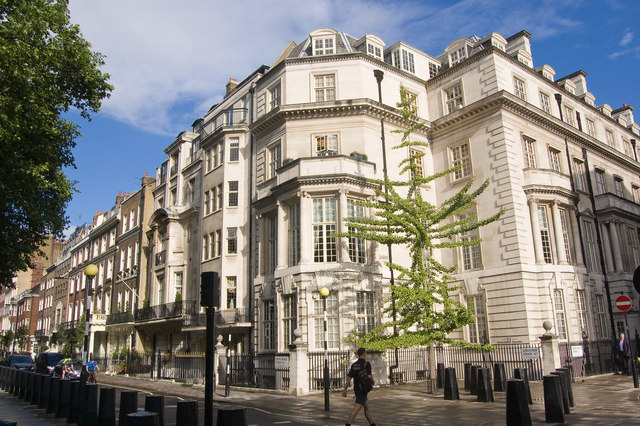
The Grosvenor family, which arrived with William the Conqueror, own most of Mayfair and Belgravia in central London since Sir Thomas married into inheritance of the land in 1677. The Grosvenor estate lost human rights challenges to the Leasehold Reform Act 1967, giving tenants a "right to buy", but the legislation was restricted.

Because of property's social importance, either for personal consumption and use or for mass production, compulsory purchase laws have met with human rights challenges. One concern is that since the 1980s privatisations, many compulsory purchase powers can be used for the benefit of private corporations whose incentives may diverge from the public interest. For example, the Water Resources Act 1991 continues to allow government bodies to order compulsory purchases of people's property, although profits go to the private shareholders of UK water companies. In R (Sainsbury's Supermarkets Ltd) v Wolverhampton CC the Supreme Court held that Wolverhampton City Council acted for an improper purpose when it took into account a promise by Tesco to redevelop another site, in determining whether to make a compulsory purchase order over a site possessed by Sainsbury's. Lord Walker stressed that "powers of compulsory acquisition, especially in a "private to private" acquisition, amounts to a serious invasion of the current owner's proprietary rights."

Nevertheless compulsory purchase orders have frequently been used to acquire land that is passed back to a private owner, including in Alliance Spring Ltd v First Secretary where homes in Islington were purchased to build the Emirates stadium for Arsenal Football Club. By contrast, in James v United Kingdom Gerald Grosvenor, 6th Duke of Westminster, the inherited owner of most of Mayfair and Belgravia, contended that leaseholders' right to buy had violated their right to property in ECHR Protocol 1, article 1. The European Court of Human Rights ruled that the Leasehold Reform Act 1967, which allowed tenants to purchase properties from their private landlords, was within a member state's margin of appreciation. It was competent for a member state to regulate property rights in the public interest.

Another issue of whether regulatory or planning decisions in general might breach property rights has not been important for the United Kingdom. In a divided case by the US Supreme Court called Lucas v South Carolina Coastal Council a majority held that if a regulation prevented a property owner developing land (in this case to preserve coastline beaches) compensation would have to be paid. This has not been followed in most of the British Commonwealth, and in Grape Bay Ltd v Attorney General of Bermuda the Privy Council advised that a decision by a democratic legislature is better than a court to determine issues of social and economic policy in relation to property. Here, McDonald's attempted to sue Bermuda for passing legislation to prevent it opening a restaurant as a breach of "property rights" under the Bermudan constitution, which it said consisted in the expectation of being able to run a business and various contractual arrangements to that end. Lord Hoffmann held that there was no such violation of property, noting that the "give and take of civil society frequently requires that the exercise of private rights should be restricted in the general public interest." The jurisprudence of the European Court of Human Rights, though not fully clear, indicates a similar approach.

=== Adverse possession ===
The most contentious method of acquiring property, albeit one that has played a huge role in the history of English land, is adverse possession. Historically, if someone possessed land for long enough, it was thought that this in itself justified acquisition of a good title. This meant that while English land was continually conquered, pillaged, and stolen by various factions, lords or barons throughout the middle ages, those who could show they possessed land long enough would not have their title questioned. A more modern function has been that land which is disused or neglected by an owner may be converted into another's property if continual use is made. Squatting in England has been a way for land to be efficiently used, particularly in periods of economic decline.

Before the Land Registration Act 2002, if a person had possessed land for 12 years, then at common law, the previous owner's right of action to eject the "adverse possessor" would expire. The common legal justification was that under the Limitation Act 1980, just like a cause of action in contract or tort had to be used within a time limit, so did an action to recover land. This promoted the finality of litigation and the certainty of claims. Time would start running when someone took exclusive possession of land, or part of it, and intended to possess it adversely to the interests of the current owner. Provided the common law requirements of "possession" that was "adverse" were fulfilled, after 12 years, the owner would cease to be able to assert a claim.

However, in the LRA 2002 adverse possession of registered land became much harder. The rules for unregistered land remained as before. But under the LRA 2002 Schedule 6, paragraphs 1 to 5, after 10 years the adverse possessor was entitled to apply to the registrar to become the new registered owner. The registrar would then contact the registered title holder and notify them of the application. If no proceedings were launched for two years to eject the adverse possessor, only then would the registrar transfer title. Before, a land owner could simply lose title without being aware of it or notified. This was the rule because it indicated the owner had never paid sufficient attention to how the land was in fact being used, and therefore the former owner did not deserve to keep it. Before 2002, time was seen to cure everything. The rule's function was to ensure land was used efficiently. The darker side, was that this idea was also very convenient for an age when land was often taken by force, and when doctrines like terra nullius were espoused by imperialists as justifications for colonisation in British Empire.

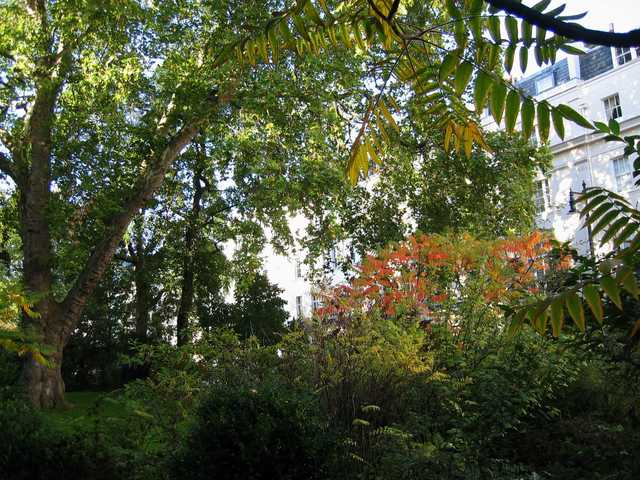
Squatters who remain long enough acquire good title to the land, but the LRA 2002 changes made acquiring title by squatting far harder.

Before the considerable hurdle of giving a registered owner notice was introduced, the particular requirements of adverse possession were reasonably straight forward. First, under Schedule 1, paragraphs 1 and 8 of the Limitation Act 1980, the time when adverse possession began was when "possession" was taken. This had to be more than something temporary or transitory, such as simply storing goods on a land for a brief period. But "possession" did not require actual occupation. So in Powell v McFarlane, it was held to be "possession" when Mr Powell, from age 14, let his cows roam into Mr McFarlane's land. The second requirement, however, was that there needed to be an intention to possess the land. Mr Powell lost his claim because simply letting his cows roam was an equivocal act: it was only later that there was evidence he intended to take possession, for instance by erecting signs on the land and parking a lorry. But this had not happened long enough for the 12-year time limit on McFarlane's claim to have expired. Third, possession is not considered "adverse" if the person is there with the owner's consent. For example, in BP Properties Ltd v Buckler, Dillon LJ held that Mrs Buckler could not claim adverse possession over land owned by BP because BP had told her she could stay rent free for life.

Fourth, under the Limitation Act 1980 sections 29 and 30, the adverse possessor must not have acknowledged the title of the owner in any express way, or the clock starts running again. However, the courts have interpreted this requirement flexibly. In JA Pye (Oxford) Ltd v Graham, Mr and Mrs Graham had been let a part of Mr Pye's land, and then the lease had expired. Mr Pye refused to renew a lease, on the basis that this might disturb getting planning permission. In fact the land remained unused, Mr Pye did nothing, while the Grahams continued to retain a key to the property and used it as part of their farm. At the end of the limitation period, they claimed the land was theirs. They had in fact offered to buy a licence from Mr Pye, but the House of Lords held that this did not amount to an acknowledgement of title that would deprive them of a claim. Having lost in the UK courts, Mr Pye took the case to the European Court of Human Rights, arguing that his business should receive £10 million in compensation because it was a breach of his right under ECHR Protocol 1, article 1 to "peaceful enjoyment of possessions". The Court rejected this, holding that it was within a member state's margin of appreciation to determine the relevant property rules.

Otherwise, a significant limit on the principle in the case of leases is that adverse possession actions will only succeed against the leaseholder, and not the freeholder once the lease has expired. However the main limitation remains that the 2002 legislation appears to have emasculated the principle of adverse possession, because the Registrar now effectively informs owners of the steps to be taken to stop adverse possession in its tracks.

== Priority among land users ==
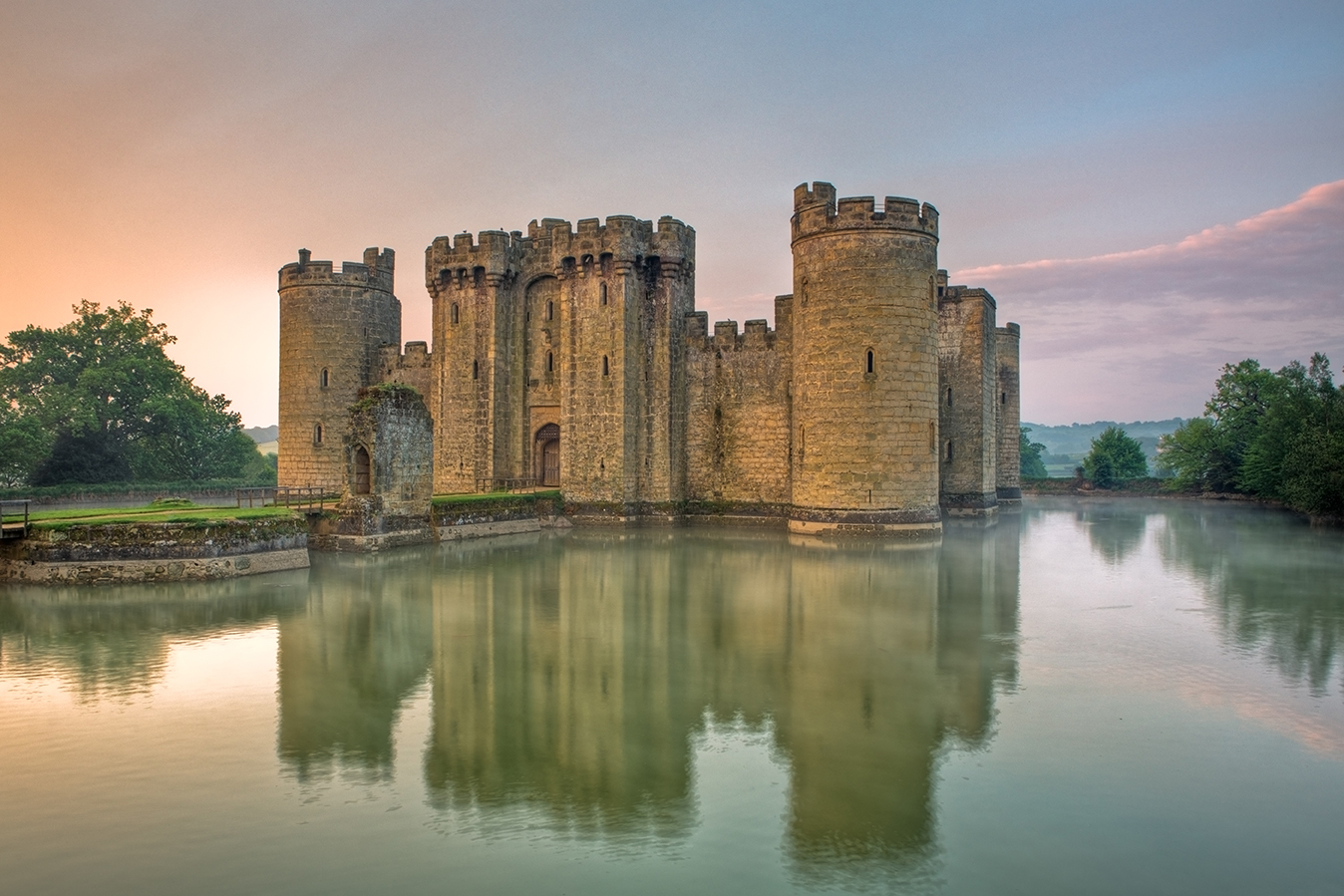
The metaphor that a "person's home is their castle" is recognised as a principle of English law, giving owners the right through crime, tort or judicial review against interference with their possessions.

Because land and the things on it can be enjoyed by a number of people at once, the law must accommodate multiple interests in its ownership rules, and often determine whose interests have priority. When the freehold of land is owned by one person, no conflict will arise in who has priority of its use. In the Latin phrase, sic utere tuo ut alienum non-laedas, one may, in general, use property in any way so long as it harms nobody else. This gives the owner the sole right to bring claims in crime or tort, particularly for others causing a nuisance, or committing a trespass, against the owner's peaceful enjoyment of property. Depending on the nature of interference, an owner may also have claims for compensation against state authorities who seek to compulsorily purchase property, or state officials who wish to enter or search property.

However, when more than one person is interested in real estate, rules of ownership priority are needed to determine who may bring claims. Rules must also determine the content of rights that the interested parties have among one another. First of all, land may be co-owned in two main ways. In a "joint tenancy", the law presumes owners agree that if one owner dies, his or her whole share will pass to the other owners. The case law primarily deals with the conditions under which a tenant's share will be severed to create a "tenancy in common", where there is no right to survivorship, and then under what conditions a tenant in common may require the property be sold to realise its value.

Second, owners may lease their property to tenants for a defined period of time. The law also recognises that owners may simply license their property for use by others, which in theory creates only personal rights. Largely because more statutory and common law privileges attach to leases, the courts have been careful to police the boundary between the two.

Third, English property law recognises the ability to charge or mortgage assets to a lender with a loan contract. This means that if the owner defaults on repayments, the lender has the security of being permitted to take possession of and to sell the property. And fourth, neighbouring property owners may create rights to use or restrict each other's use of their land through easements and covenants. Although such things may arise by agreement, English law acknowledges their proprietary character, and so they bind successors in title.

=== Co-ownership and termination ===
While a sole owner will generally be free to use and dispose of his interest in the way he sees fit, the rules differ when land is under co-ownership. The Law of Property Acts, which aimed to improve land's transferability on the market, required that land could have a maximum of four co-owners, who must all have the same title. This means that a purchaser need only deal with a maximum of four people to buy an interest (e.g. an outright purchase, or a mortgage) in it. The Law of Property Act 1925 sections 1(6) and 36(2) prohibits a divided legal title, known as a "tenancy in common". If there are more people with a co-ownership interest, then by the Law of Property Act 1925 section 34(2) the first four people named on a conveyance will be deemed by law to be trustees for the further co-owners.

In effect these first four people become legal representatives for the other owners in equity. Although to simplify conveyancing the law does not, equity does recognise unlimited numbers of co-owners, and owners with unequal interests (i.e. "tenants in common"). If land is traded, their interests will be considered "overreached", or effectively bought out over their heads with their interest detached from the land and reattached to purchase money, if money is paid to at least two trustees.

The requirement for two trustees to receive the money is intended to reduce danger of one trustee running off with money to the detriment of the equitable owners. In the first main form of co-ownership, known as "joint tenancy", the joint tenants are deemed to share equally in the value of the property if it is sold, and if one joint tenant dies, the others will (by the "right of survivorship" or jus accrescendi in Latin) take the whole of his share. This is a legal presumption, and owners are free to stipulate that they wish their share to be apportioned differently (e.g. depending on financial contribution to the property), and that they wish someone else to inherit their share. When making a transfer of property on HM Land Registry's "TR1" form, owners may indicate which relation they choose, however in Stack v Dowden the Supreme Court observed that this will not always be decisive, particularly where people do not have full understanding of the survivorship rule and have made very unequal financial contributions to the property. But otherwise, co-owners will remain as joint tenants in equity until they take action to sever their share.

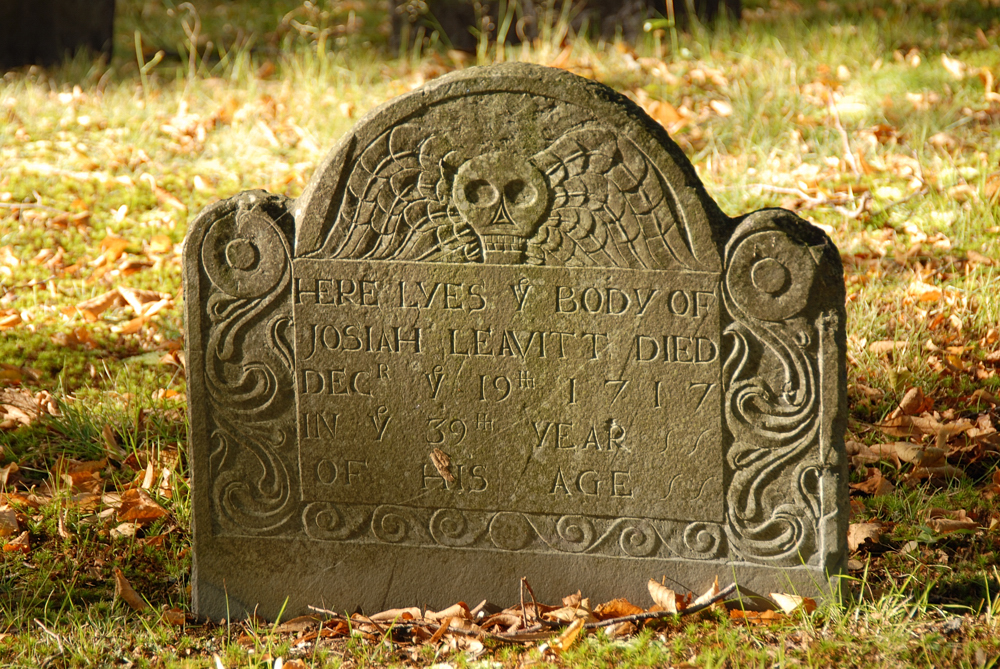
Severance of a joint tenancy into a "tenancy in common" must be effected before death, unless it is desired that the share in the property will pass to co-owners.

Severance in equity can be achieved in five main ways. Firstly, the most certain way to sever is to serve a statutory notice under Law of Property Act 1925 section 36 on the other joint tenants "a notice in writing of such desire" to sever one's share. Some courts have construed this provision restrictively, so in Harris v Goddard the Court of Appeal held that because Mrs Harris in her divorce petition requested merely that "such order be made... in respect of the former matrimonial home", and did not request that an order be made immediately, she had not yet severed her share. This meant that when Mr Harris unexpectedly died after a car crash, she was able to remain a joint tenant and inherit the whole home, and the children of Mr Harris' first marriage did not. A notice will be considered effective, or "served" under Law of Property Act 1925 section 196 when it is left at a person's home or office, or if posted and so long as it does not go undelivered (in contrast to the postal rule) when it would ordinarily arrive. In Kinch v Bullard Mrs Johnson was terminally ill, and wished to sever her share of the home and sent a letter, but when she realised that Mr Johnson was ill too and would die first, she wanted to cancel her severance notice. Neuberger J held that because the letter was already delivered to Mr Johnson's house, it could not be withdrawn, even though Mr Johnson had not yet read it.

Second, and in contrast to the formalistic approach for section 36, it was held in Burgess v Rawnsley that a course of dealings between two people can manifest the intention to sever. Mr Burgess had discussed with Ms Rawnsley selling her share in a property for £750 but negotiations stalled when she asked for more, and then he unexpectedly died. "'Even if there was not any firm agreement but only a course of dealing", said Lord Denning MR, "it clearly evinced an intention by both parties that the property should henceforth be held in common and not jointly." Third, simply making an agreement to sell one's share will be counted by the courts as severing. Fourth, the declaration of bankruptcy effects severance, as under the Insolvency Act 1986 section 306, a bankrupt's estate will vest immediately in the trustee in bankruptcy.

Fifth, killing a joint tenant will sever a share, because the Forfeiture Act 1982 generally prevents a killer to benefit from his wrong. However, in Re K the Court of Appeal upheld a claim by a lady to be relieved from forfeiture using a discretion in section 2. Mrs K had shot and killed her husband, but only after prolonged domestic violence, and she had been cleared of murder because it did not count as intentional. Lastly, if practical, beneficial owners may request trustees to physically partition property under Trusts of Land and Appointment of Trustees Act 1996 section 7, and compensate the different owners in money as is appropriate.

When co-owners fall into disagreement over how land is to be used, the Trusts of Land and Appointment of Trustees Act 1996 guides who can live in the property or when it can be sold. One of the primary purposes of TLATA 1996, given the massive growth of co-ownership and people acquiring interests in land through trusts, was to reduce the occasions on which land would be sold if that meant people would lose their homes. At the highest level of generality, TLATA 1996 section 6 says the legal trustees of a property (i.e. the legal owners on the title, rather than the owners in equity) generally have all the powers of an absolute owner, but should pay regard to beneficiaries and owe them a duty of care. More importantly, sections 11 to 13 give beneficiaries a limited right to occupy a property if this accords with the interest and purpose of the trust, if land is suitable for occupation, although trustees may restrict this right if reasonable.

If disagreements are insoluble, section 14 allows a beneficial owner to apply to court for sale. Section 15 requires that the court pays regard (i) to the intentions of the settlor (ii) to the purpose of the trust (iii) the interests of any children living there, and (iv) the interests of secured creditors. This means that in a common case where a bank is pressing for sale of a family home, its interests do not override all others. So in Mortgage Corporation v Shaire where Mr Shaire had forged his wife's signature to get a mortgage on their home and died, and the bank sought possession and a sale under TLATA 1996 section 15, Neuberger J held that he would postpone the sale, because it was still her home. However TLATA 1996 went further when a creditor has become insolvent. It inserted in the Insolvency Act 1986 new sections 283A and 335A, which say that at the point of bankruptcy, the decision to order a sale should be guided by (a) the interests of the bankrupt's creditors, (b) the spouse's conduct, their resources, the children's needs, and any other need, except for the bankrupt's own. However under section 335A(3) after one year expires, a court must order sale of property to realise its value for creditors "unless the circumstances of the case are exceptional". So only in extreme situations, as where losing a home might worsen the occupant's schizophrenia, have courts postponed sales. Because the legislation is so heavily pro-bank, the suggestion was made in Nicholls v Lan that it may well violate the right to a family life in ECHR article 8.

=== Leases and licences ===
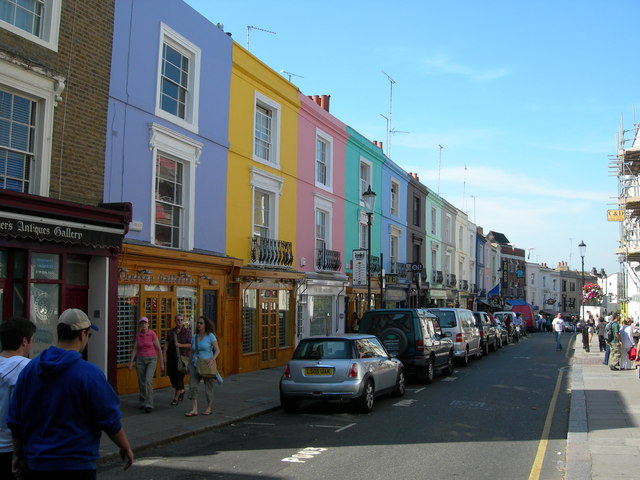
Affordable accommodation has steadily declined since the 1970s, with prices trebling between 1980 and 2010 UK wide, and rental prices escalating further.

As opposed to sharing full ownership, and without dividing land physically, the use and enjoyment of land can be shared when owners grant licences or leases. The difference between the two matters because a lease counts as a property right that binds third parties even if a freehold changes hands, and because more statutory protection for tenants attaches only to leases, albeit that many cases have increased protection for licence holders too. A licence is said to be a personal obligation, which in traditional theory was said to create rights enforceable only between the people privy to the licence. First, licences may arise by implication of the law, such as when a customer walks through an open shop door. The customer is recognised as having a "bare licence" which makes him immune from an action for trespass, and can only be asked to leave over within a reasonable time. Second, they may arise by statute, as with the Family Law Act 1996 sections 30–31. Third, they may arise by estoppel. And practically most important, licences can arise through a contract. This will set the terms of the land's use by the licensee. For example, in Hurst v Picture Theatres Ltd, Mr Hurst was removed from a High Street Kensington theatre by a manager who honestly believed that he had not paid for his ticket. Buckley LJ held the theatre was not entitled to remove him, even if it revoked the ticket, because with, and in addition to breach of contract they committed assault on him, for which he could claim additional damages. However, breach of contractual licence will not entitle the victim to force his way back, so in Thompson v Park a teacher who tried to force his way back into a school was told he had no remedy because he should have sought a court declaration first. If possible, and as damages will often be inadequate, the courts show preference for awarding specific performance. This was so even when the claimant was the National Front, who had licensed a Pavilion for its annual conference.

This preference for specific performance has been manifested generally in providing more "property-like" rights for licensees. In Manchester Airport plc v Dutton, an airport company, with a licence on National Trust land, was held entitled to claim that trespassing protesters could be removed. Its contractual right was held to be better than the trespassers' right to remain. Then, in Errington v Wood, it was held that when a father gave contractual licence to his son and daughter in law to remain in a Newcastle upon Tyne home till they paid the mortgage, and that the house would become theirs when they did, this became irrevocable. It was also held in Binions v Evans that a constructive trust arose out of Mr and Mrs Binion promising the former owners of the Tredegar Estate that Mrs Evans could remain for life in her cottage. The Binions were bound by their promise, even though the promise was not to Mrs Evans. However, a later Court of Appeal in Ashburn Anstalt v Arnold denied that constructive trusts should easily be created or that promises to could become binding on successors in title.

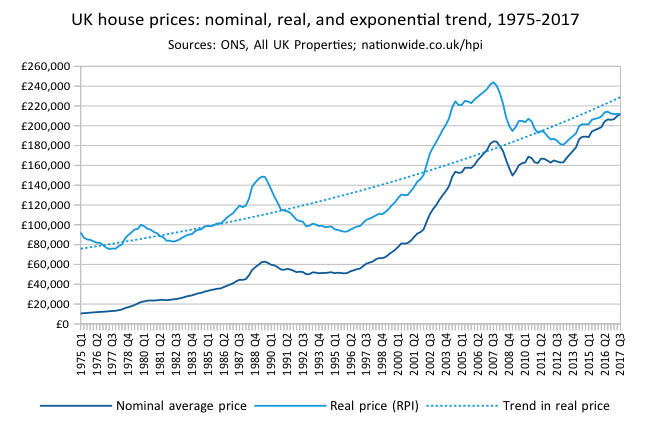
Since abolition of fair rent regulation by the Housing Act 1980, UK house prices periodically surged, taking an unaffordably high share of people's income. Real estate investment trusts, which get tax breaks for buying up residential property, fuel the surge.

However, of more contemporary social significance is the lease. Leases are most usually created by a contract. For short leases, under three years, there is no requirement for writing, and under seven years, there is no requirement for registration. Longer leases, even if they do not fulfil formality and registration requirements can also be recognised in equity. The interest can also take effect under a constructive trust, in turn leading to protection for actual occupants. Formally known under the Law of Property Act 1925 section 205(1)(xxvii) as a "term of years absolute", a lease divides property by time, and with a lease comes a measure of statutory protections for tenants. Under the old Rent Act 1977 and Landlord and Tenant Act 1954, these were much more significant, in particular providing controls on escalating rental prices and granting a right to not have a tenancy ended without a good justification (an equivalent to the right to unfair dismissal in UK labour law). This protection was seen as necessary because of the inequality of bargaining power that tenants have.

However, during the 1980s, these rights were removed, along with most rent regulation. Under the Landlord and Tenant Act 1985, the most significant remaining protection is the section 11 obligation on landlords to repair properties' structures, water and heating facilities for short leases. The division, both historical and contemporary, has led to significant litigation over the meaning of a "lease". In the leading case, Street v Mountford, the House of Lords identified the factual grant of exclusive possession of a property as being the distinguishing feature between a lease and a licence. Mrs Mountford paid a "licence fee" for her home, and had signed a form agreeing that the statute protecting leases from unfair rent rises (the Rent Act 1977) did not apply. She nevertheless argued that she had a lease, and the House of Lords agreed because despite the form of her agreements, the substance of the arrangement was to give her exclusive possession of her living space. According to Lord Templeman in AG Securities v Vaughan, if people could contract out of them, any statutory protections "would be a dead letter because in a state of housing shortage a person seeking residential accommodation may agree to anything to obtain shelter." For the question of whether a person has the benefit of statutory protection, it was held to be irrelevant (counter-intuitively among property lawyers) that the defendant itself has a proprietary interest. So in Bruton v London & Quadrant Housing Trust Mr Bruton's housing association only had a licence for the property from the council, and it was not doing repairs. Although Mr Bruton needed a lease to claim, and as a matter of property law he could not be granted a lease from a trust that only had a licence, for the purpose of statutory protection, the House of Lords agreed he was granted a lease, and so could request repairs.

=== Mortgages and security ===
While real property may be divided among co-owners and tenants for the purpose of the land's use and enjoyment, taking a mortgage of property primarily serves the purpose of ensuring loans are repaid. Because of the nature of money lending, and frequently unequal bargaining power between banks and borrowers, the law gives significant legal protection to borrowers against the enforcement of unfair bargains. Along with pledges, liens and equitable charges, English law counts a mortgage as one of four main kinds of security interest, whereby a proprietary right that binds third parties is said to arise on conclusion of a contract. It must simply be the contract's intention to make property available to secure repayment. The Law of Property Act 1925 section 85 say that a mortgage requires a deed (under LPMPA 1989 section 1, a document that is signed, witnessed and states it is a deed). Under the Land Registration Act 2002 sections 23 and 27, a notice of a mortgage must be filed with HM Land Registry for the mortgage to be effective. Then, Law of Property Act 1925 section 87 says mortgages confer upon the mortgagee (i.e. the secured lender) the same rights as a 3000-year lease holder. The reason for this reference to "3000 years" is that in a primitive protective measure, the common law said mortgage terms must always allow for the property to be redeemed in the end, when the debt is repaid. In the 18th century decision of Vernon v Bethell Lord Henley LC refused to enforce the conveyance of Vernon's sugar plantation in Antigua to a deceased London lender, Bethell, when Vernon had trouble repaying, even though some exchanges between the two had raised the possibility of giving up the land to satisfy the debt. Given the considerable interest paid already, Lord Henley LC held it would frustrate (or "clog") Vernon's right to redeem property. As he put it protection for the borrower was warranted because "necessitous men are not, truly speaking, free men, but, to answer a present exigency, will submit to any terms that the crafty may impose upon them". Accordingly, the rule developed that "once a mortgage, always a mortgage", meaning a mortgage cannot be turned into a conveyance of the property by the operation of terms in an agreement. It means that a lender may at most sell a property to realise its value, but may not take ownership, and the borrower must always practically be able to get back the property. The rule was suspended for companies by the Companies Act 2006 section 739, and was criticised in Jones v Morgan for being inappropriate in commerce, but it still survives as a rudimentary common law method to protecting vulnerable borrowers.

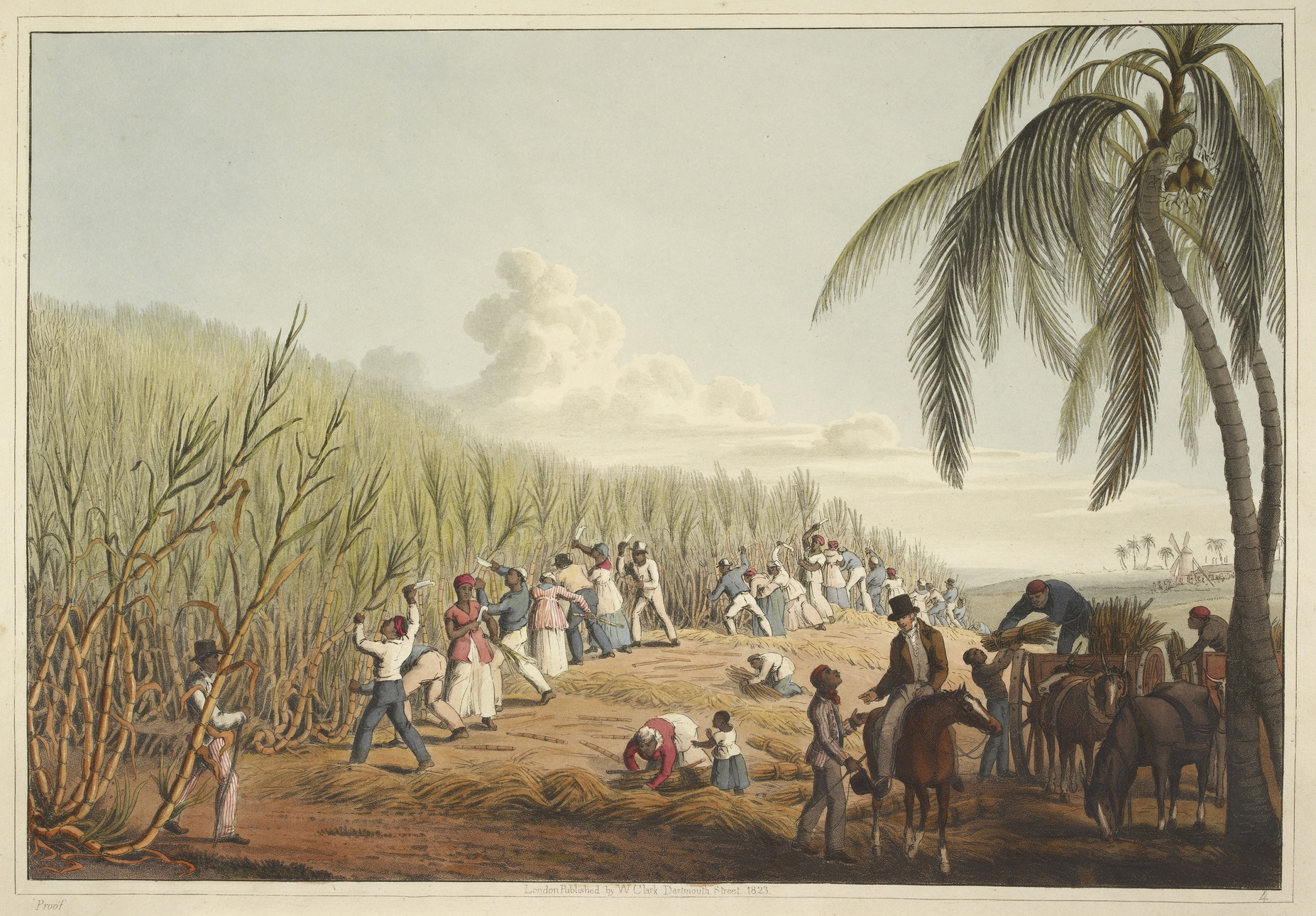
In 1762, in Vernon v Bethell, Lord Henley LC held that "necessitous men are not, truly speaking, free men", so a mortgage lender was barred from acquiring his debtor's Antigua sugar plantation. The principle inspired the Second Bill of Rights in 1944, for social and economic rights in US legislation.

The most relevant protective measure at common law today is the right of borrowers to cancel mortgages if they were misrepresented about the mortgage's terms, or if they entered agreements because of undue influence. In the leading case, Royal Bank of Scotland v Etridge, a group of appeals all involved a husband allegedly pressuring his wife into signing a mortgage agreement with a bank, where security was over the family home. The House of Lords agreed that undue influence would make a contract voidable, and if a bank should have realised this possibility, it could not enforce the mortgage agreement against the spouse's share of the home. Accordingly, if banks wished to ensure valid mortgages they would need to have confirmation from an independent solicitor that the spouse fully understood the transaction. This ruling was intended to eliminate cases where people do not understand the consequences of mortgages. Alternatively, if despite independent advice, a spouse is still unduly influenced or is misrepresented the facts, he or she will have no recourse against a bank selling the home, but may have a claim against the solicitor for professional negligence. Beyond common law, there are three main kinds of statutory protection. First, the Financial Services and Markets Act 2000 codified a system of licensing for mortgage lenders. The Financial Conduct Authority maintains a Code of Practice and enforces compliance with the threat of licence withdrawal. Second, the Consumer Credit Act 1974 empowers the Office of Fair Trading to engage in similar regulation of the second mortgage market. Third, the content of mortgage is regulated by ordinary consumer contract protection in the Unfair Terms in Consumer Contracts Regulations 1999. The general thrust of the law is to ensure complete transparency, and to cancel extortionate credit agreements, so that consumers know what they are getting, and do not get an unfair bargain.

Money lenders have extensive rights from common law and statute. A mortgagee's first right is to repayment of the debt, but if the borrower's circumstances mean this is impossible, a process of taking possession of the mortgaged property and selling it usually begins. Almost every step, however, is mediated through court. The Administration of Justice Act 1970 section 36 says that the court may adjourn proceedings if the "mortgagor is likely to be able within a reasonable period to pay any sums due under the mortgage", and the Consumer Credit Act 1974 sections 129–130 does the same for second mortgages. In an anomalous case, Ropaigealach v Barclays Bank plc a bank had auctioned off a (second) house the owning a family was away. Clarke LJ felt unable to apply the AJA 1970, because properly construed, it was only able to halt proceedings when legal proceedings had in fact been launched, and here there were none. In a more borrower-friendly decision, Cheltenham & Gloucester Building Society v Norgan Waite LJ gave guidance that in ordering a plan for repayment, a judge should give "the period most favourable to the mortgagor at the outset", so that repeated applications to court on continuing defaults could be avoided, and so that "the mortgagee can be heard with justice to say that the mortgagor has had his chance". When it comes to a sale, Law of Property Act 1925 sections 101 and 103 require that the provision for sale must have been in the mortgage deed, that three months notice and space must be given. Section 88 confirms that a buyer after a sale receives an unencumbered title. In the sale process itself, there is a duty of care. In Cuckmere Brick Co v Mutual Finance Mutual Finance auctioned Cuckmere Brick Co's property after it had defaulted on a loan, but failed to advertise that the property had secured planning permission for building more flats. Salmon LJ emphasised that because the borrower will still be liable for sums on a loan if a house is undersold, because the "mortgagor is vitally affected by the result of the sale", an obligation is owed to get "the true market value." Moreover, a higher duty of scrutiny will be imposed if a mortgagee sells to a related party. In Tse Kwong Lam v Wong Chit Sen Mr Wong sold property taken from Mr Tse to his wife, after not advertising the auction. The Privy Council advised that while delay in the claim meant the sale should not be set aside, damages could be awarded because of the significant conflict of interest. Lord Templeman emphasised that "a heavy onus lies on the mortgagee to show that in all respects he acted fairly" so the transaction is perfectly fair and equal.

=== Easements ===
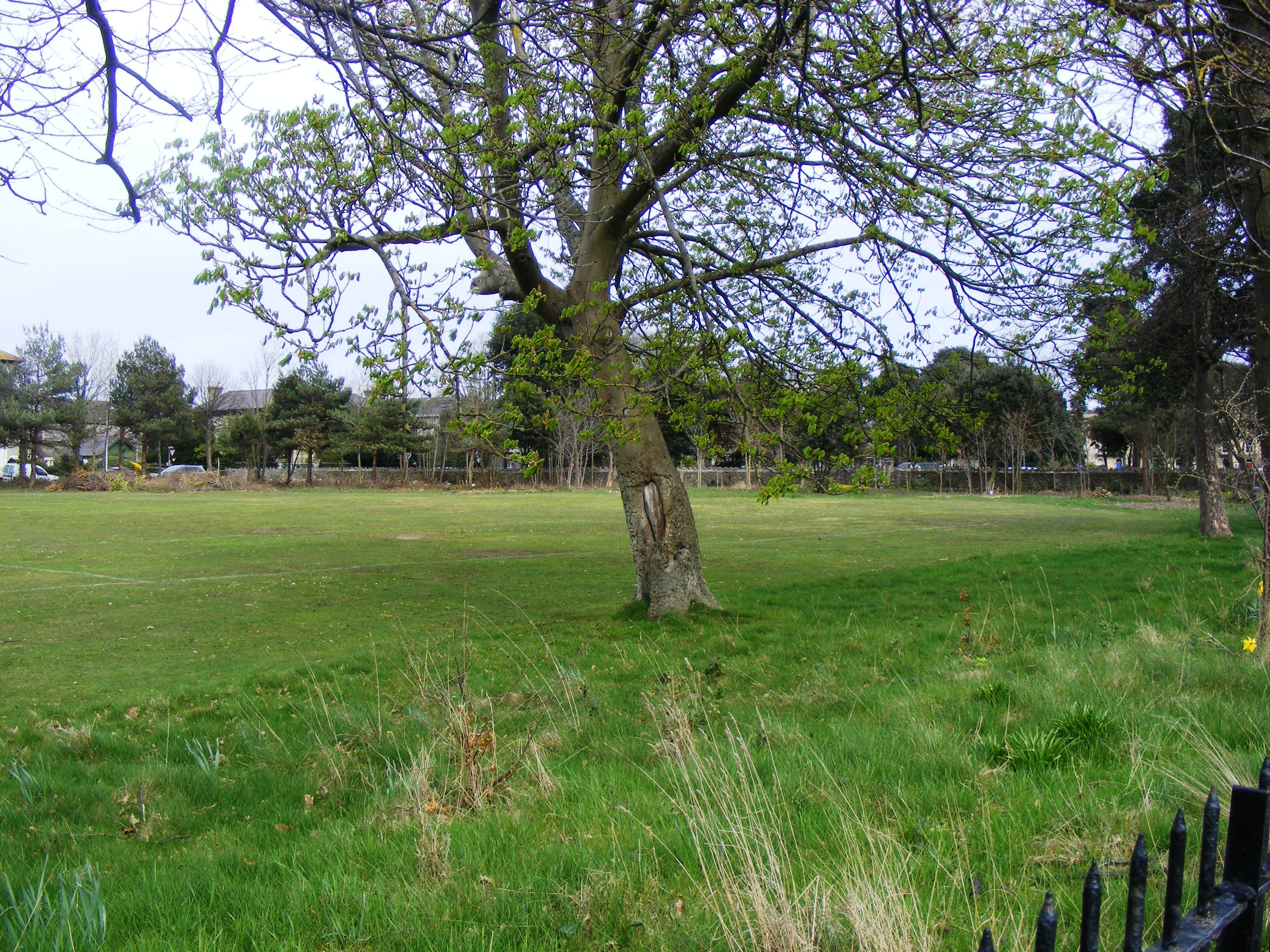
Ellenborough Park, Weston-super-Mare

Easements and covenants, although treated separately by law, both functioned as primitive forms of planning device. Before the development of local government and planning, people living in neighbouring property could only regulate how each used their land through agreements. An agreement for a first neighbour to use the land of a second is an easement, usually involving a right of way, or a profit a prendre, if it allows the first to take something from the land (e.g. hunting ducks, fishing, or grazing sheep). An agreement for a first neighbour to refrain using his own land for the benefit of a second would be a restrictive covenant. Naturally people could contract to use land in any way conceivable. However the courts viewed it as a different matter whether a successor in title to the original contracting party was bound. Courts were particularly chary with "positive covenants" (which might require a landowner's expenditure and could not be fulfilled by doing nothing) and "negative easements" (which unlike covenants might be acquired without agreement). As a result, modern planning decisions by councils, primarily through the Town and Country Planning Act 1990, largely displaced the common law and equity to regulate relations in neighbourhoods. Yet many easements and covenants remain.

The range of easements is primarily restricted by a fourfold test laid out in Re Ellenborough Park. The homeowners around Ellenborough Park wished to show they had an easement over the communal gardens to claim compensation for its requisition in World War II. Lord Evershed MR agreed because (1) they owned the dominant tenements, (2) their rights to the "servient" tenement (i.e. the park) benefited their land (3) they did not own the servient tenement, and, despite some prior authority suggesting easements could not be for pure pleasure, (4) it was within a recognised class of easements. Most often, easements are rights of way. Many recent cases have also involved car parking, including Moncrieff v Jamieson where the owner of land between the shoreline and a steep escarpment only had access through his neighbour's, and he had, from 1973 become used to parking there. The servient tenement owner claimed the car parking took away his use of the land, and so could not be an easement. But the House of Lords held that in the nature of parking (which was not permanent) to which the dominant owner had become accustomed, the right could count as an easement.

To create an easement, first, under Law of Property Act 1925 section 65(1) a landowner may expressly grant a neighbour a right over his land, or may reserve a right when selling a portion of land to someone else. Second, an easement may also come about through an express assurance, triggering proprietary estoppel. This was the case in Crabb v Arun District Council, where a landowner acquired an easement after the council assured him they would leave him access to his land over theirs, when he sold another portion that gave the route in from the main road. Third, the law may find easements by a process of construction, in general, if they are necessary for property's reasonable enjoyment. The rules are analogous to incorporation and implication terms in contracts, so for instance in Green v Lord Somerleyton Jonathan Parker LJ approved an easement for drainage of water from Lord Somerleyton's land into Green's dykes, because when land was sold on in 1921 its proper construction incorporated a drainage deed. In Kent v Kavanagh it was clarified, however, that because reasonable enjoyment was the aim of implication, an easement was only to be implied in situations where land was in common ownership and occupation. This test was satisfied on those facts, where two semi-detached houses had a small path between them to access the back gardens, and a subsequent buyer wished to build into its half of the path. Chadwick LJ held the easement was necessary for enjoyment of the back garden. Fourth, under Law of Property Act 1925 section 62, easements that are "appertaining or reputed to appertain to the land" at the time of a conveyance will bind the purchaser. So in Hair v Gillman a lady who parked her car in a neighbour's forecourt while she had a seven-year lease acquired a crystallised lease when she subsequently bought the house. If easements are used for twenty years, however, a fifth method of acquiring a crystallised legal right is through the Prescription Act 1832. This method comes from simple period of extended use, and does not require showing any need for the easement. There are also a range of statutory easements, including, notably, "wayleaves" reserved by public authorities to install pipes or cables, and the Countryside and Rights of Way Act 2000 which extended the registered number of private and common lands where people have the "right to roam" for recreation. However created, an easement ought to be registered to ensure protection. An easement that is not registered will be recognised as an over-riding interest according to LRA 2002 Schedule 3, paragraph 3, if known to a person to whom land is sold and if the easement is obvious on a reasonably careful inspection, but only if the easement is acquired at law (not equity) since 13 October 2003.

=== Covenants ===
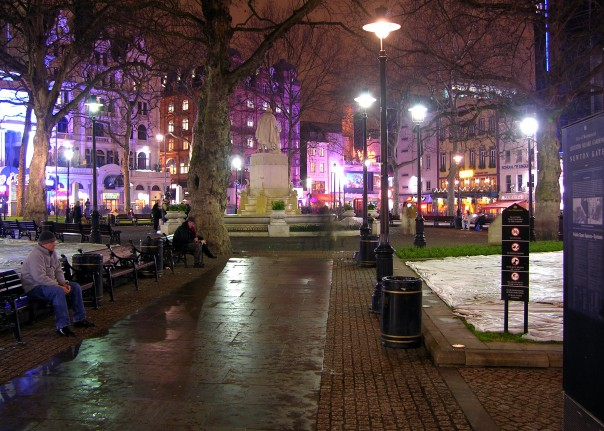
Leicester Square in central London exists because a restrictive covenant was held to effectively bind successors in title in Tulk v Moxhay.

Unlike an easement, a covenant can only be acquired through agreement or possibly by an assurance, but not by prescription. In the most famous case, Tulk v Moxhay the owner of what is now Leicester Square promised a neighbour he would not erect buildings, but the subsequent purchaser (who knew of this deal) tried to build. Lord Cottenham LC held that a prior covenant may bind future owners if the covenant touched and concerned the land, the original covenantees intended the covenant to bind future owners, and the future owners with the same land had notice of the covenant. Under Law of Property Act 1925 section 78, successors in title to the person named to benefit from the covenant are deemed to have standing to enforce the covenant and Law of Property Act 1925 section 79 codified the presumption that a covenant is to be not personal, but proprietary, and binding on successors in title. That presumption, however, can be rebutted by construction of agreements between the neighbours. This happened in Morrells of Oxford Ltd v Oxford United Football Club where Robert Walker LJ held that Morrell's pub could not get an injunction against the Oxford UFC building a pub, because although Oxford UFC's predecessor had promised not to in 1962, the document failed to use language indicating successors would be bound in the pub clause, when it did in other clauses. A controversial aspect of covenants is that courts only enforce ones which restrict land's use, and thus far have refused to enforce covenants that require positive expenditure. In Rhone v Stephens this meant that a house owner could not be required to repair his roof, which protected a cottage underneath from water. Lord Templeman viewed this would contradict the rule that someone should not be made liable to a contract when they have not been privy to it. This has been mitigated slightly when all neighbours have reciprocal benefits and burdens. Halsall v Brizell held that if some Liverpool estate dwellers had the benefit of using the estate roads, drains, promenade, and sea walls, they could be required to pay for its upkeep. Covenants are enforceable, generally, through injunctions, but may also (if an injunction would be oppressive) enforceable through a payment of damages reflecting the loss of the right. For instance in Wrotham Park Estate Co Ltd v Parkside Homes Ltd a developer who built homes in breach of a restrictive covenant was ordered by Brightman J to pay 5% of his anticipated profits in compensation. Finally, applications to the Land Tribunal may be made for declarations to extinguish covenants under Law of Property Act 1925 section 84 if it is obsolete, the beneficiary would lose little, or has implicitly agreed, or it impedes a reasonable user of land and the beneficiary can be compensated.

== Social use of land and regulation ==
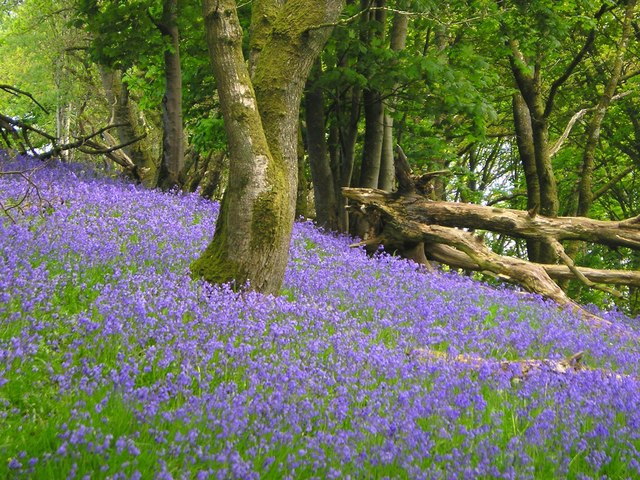
A bluebell wood, near Lampeter in Wales. While HM Land Registry remains incomplete, official statistics report about 2% of land reserved for public recreation and conservation, 10% used for housing, commerce and transport, 13% for forestry, and 75% for agriculture.

While many "land law" texts in England typically confine themselves to the content, creation and protection of interests in property in land, the social significance of land extends to the way it is used. Historically, land was the most important source of social wealth, but over the 19th century corporations and the managed fund eclipsed it as a means to preserve wealth. Yet land remains vital for community infrastructure, housing, agriculture, forestry, water and natural resources. The quality of life for the vast majority of people is closely connected to rules on planning, home building and rent regulation, food, forest and water enterprises, and the protection of the environment and climate in replacing gas, oil and coal with clean energy.

=== Planning and infrastructure ===
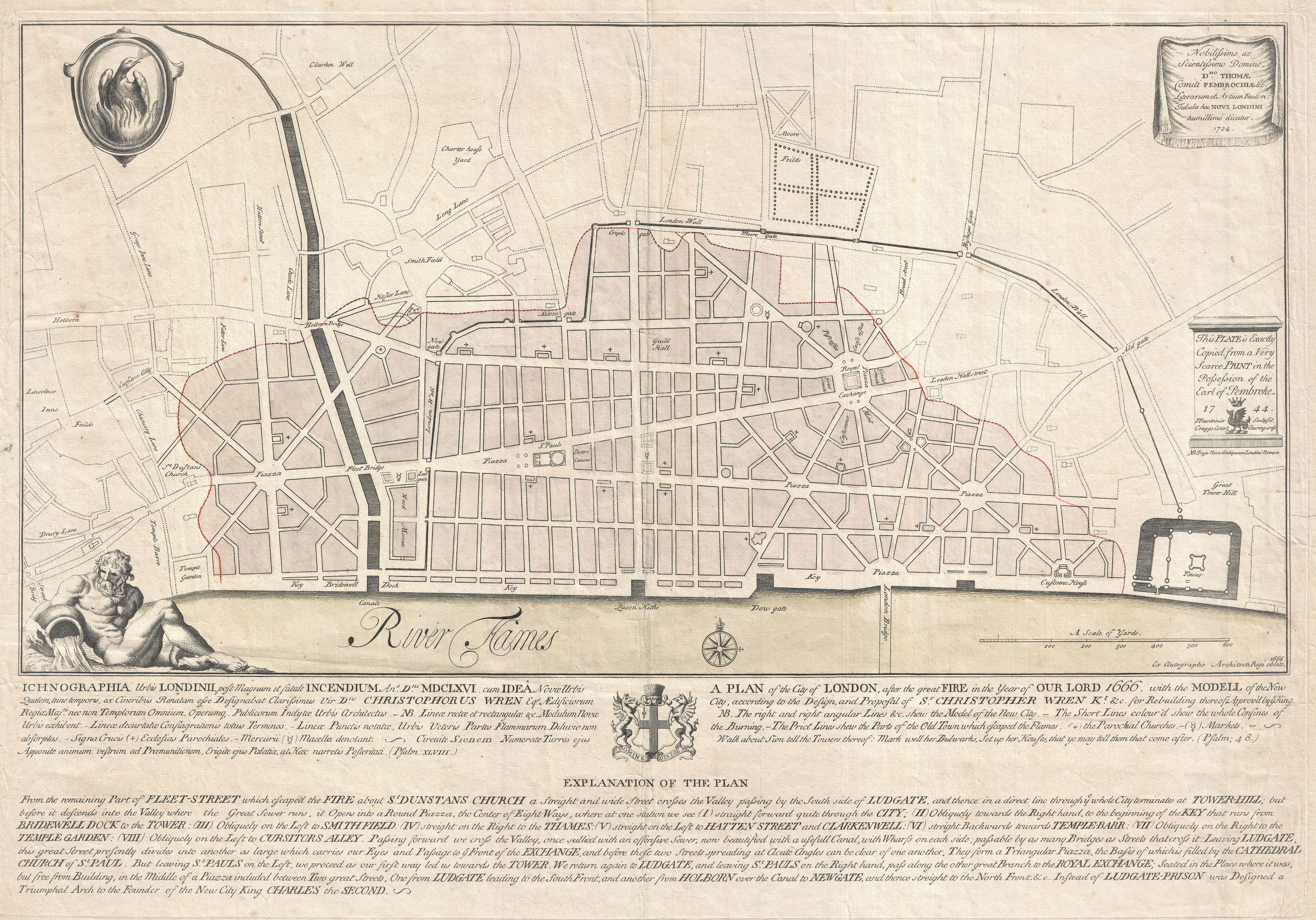
Christopher Wren's plan for redevelopment after the Great Fire of London in 1666 was never put into effect because people were unwilling to give up their pre-fire property boundaries, even despite the quick settlement procedure under the Fire of London Disputes Act 1666.

Before 1909, most land planning was based on private laws of nuisance, and agreements of neighbours for easements and covenants. However, Magna Carta, and Charter of the Forest ("forest" being an old term for crown land) codified ancient rules on the use of the commons: public land that people who did not own land could use for gathering food, wood, hunting, or herding. Over the centuries, aristocrats who controlled Parliament gradually enclosed more common land, taking it into private ownership, and recognising this bias for the private, in 1865 in Tapling v Jones, Lord Cranworth proclaimed that every "man... [has] a right to use his own land by building on it as he thinks most to his interest". The case law had a narrow concept of what counted as a nuisance. For example, there was no claim for loss of amenity if a loud railway was run past one's house. In Sturges v Bridgman the Court of Appeal held that what counted as a nuisance would depend on the character of the locality, and this meant that 'what would be a nuisance in Belgrave Square would not necessarily be so in Bermondsey'. In response, as Parliament was opened to universal suffrage, local councils acquired more powers "to prevent inappropriate development and protect the environment" to ensure that land law will add "to the benefit of the whole community." The Housing, Town Planning etc. Act 1909 first gave local governments the authority to develop planning schemes, and employ inspectors, with appeal to a Local Government Board, initially regarding sanitary conditions. The Town and Country Planning Act 1947 made the most critical change, requiring that any development of land required permission from the local government, unless there was a relevant exception. With rules on compulsory purchase this made a modern national system of planning.

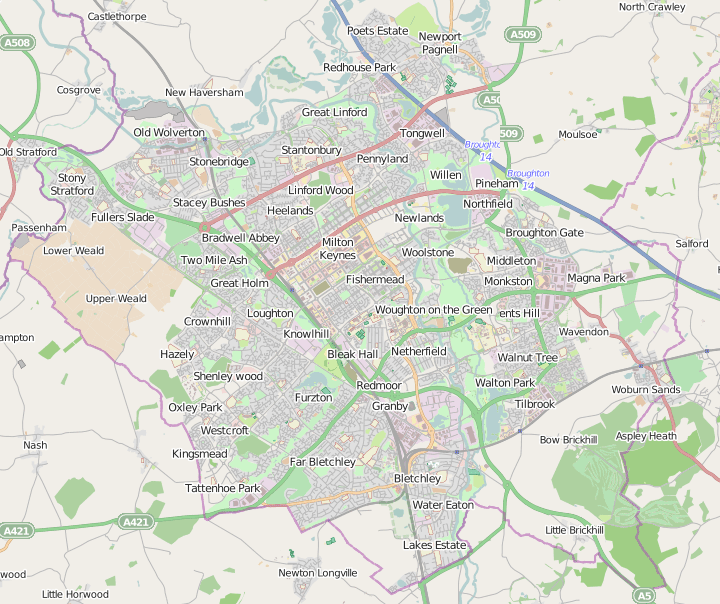
"New towns" are major examples of national infrastructure planning. Towns like Milton Keynes (est. 1967) can be designated by central government under the New Towns Act 1981, though the powers have barely been used since the 1970s.

Today, the Town and Country Planning Act 1990 contains the basic planning rules. Section 57 requires permission be granted for 'development' of land. Section 55 defines 'development' as building, engineering, mining, or making any material change to building, including demolition, or splitting a home into two. However, subsection 2 exempts changes to dwelling houses for something incidental to enjoyment, for agriculture or forestry, or changes of a property's use within a set of property 'classes'. For many people making changes to business property, the Town and Country Planning (Use Classes) Order 1987 then becomes relevant. Each property use has a class. Class A1 includes shops like bookstores or hairdressers, class A3 includes cafes, class C1 is hotels, and class C3 is homes. If a change to a property's use is made within a class, no permission for alterations is needed. If permission is granted, it may be unconditional, or under section 106 the local authority can attach conditions that the landowner must follow. Sections 171A to 196C contain the enforcement rules, which include allowing local authorities to charge people with offences for breach of planning rules, and to have a right of entry to property. However, under section 171B, if someone has breached a planning rule, but no enforcement proceedings are brought within four years, there can be no charge: the landowner becomes immune. Sections 197 to 261 contain detailed rules about matters such as trees, advertisements, highways. For establishments that will be used for specific purposes, such as restaurants, pubs or clubs, the Licensing Act 2003 sets out the procedures by which businesses can acquire a licence from their local authority, and the conditions (including time of trading, alcohol provision, and noise levels) under which the establishment must be maintained.

=== Housing and tenant rights ===
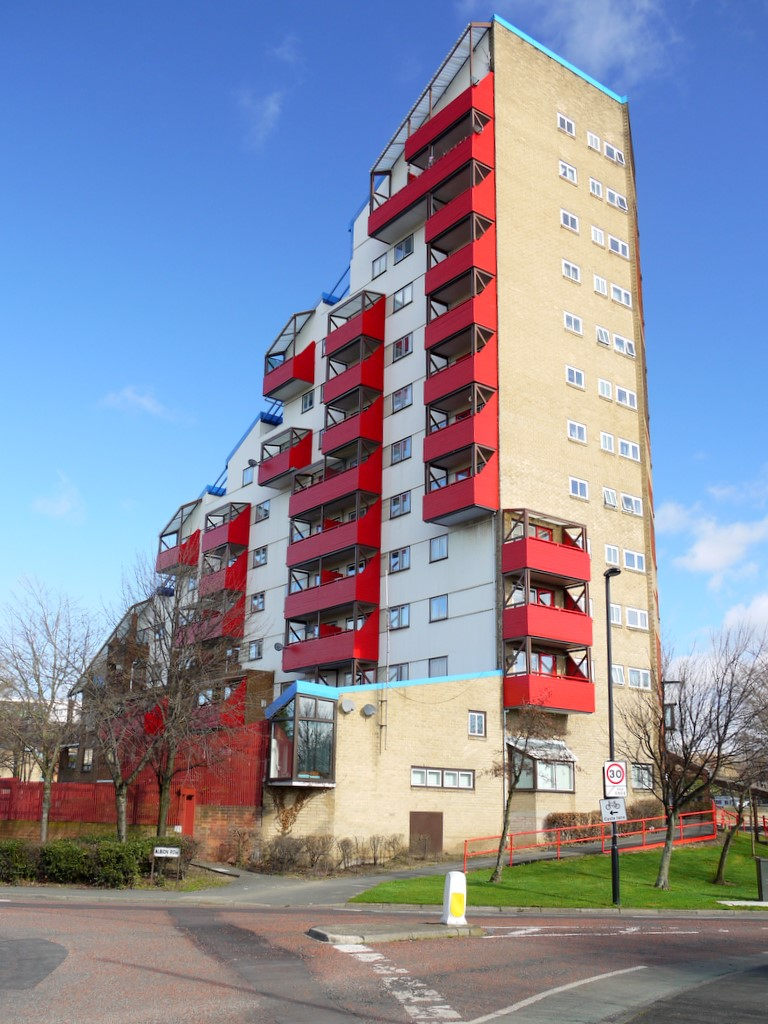
Tom Collins House Newcastle reflects modern design in council housing, and cost £42 a week in 2012.

Although homeowners together own just 5% of the land area in England and Wales, housing and other buildings account for a large share of capital wealth, and constitute the basis of the universal human "right to housing" and to a private life and home. Increasingly homes and real estate have become investment objects, with tax breaks for "Real Estate Investment Trusts", meaning reduced public and individual home ownership. A growing proportion of people cannot afford to buy homes, and so must rent, while rents take a growing share of people's income. Although housing benefit is available for people on low incomes, this is entirely taken by private landlords whose escalating rents are an increasing cost to taxpayers. Since the Housing Act 1985 there has been a right to buy property for secure tenants from local councils that had aimed to keep rents affordable. Despite increased supply and the building of houses at a consistently faster rate than population growth, the greater number of multiple houses owned by landlords and corporations, and units left empty, means that the unequal bargaining power of landlords can be used to charge ever higher rents. The Building Act 1984 and Building Regulations 2010 require reduced carbon in buildings, however there is not yet a requirement for all homes to have solar panels, battery storage, and heat pumps to ensure clean air.

Reflecting its poor housing quality, the UK has among the most minimal tenant rights in the world. Fair rent regulation exists in many countries to prevent unaffordable housing, such as in Canada, or Germany, but was abolished in the UK by the Housing Act 1985 section 24. The Landlord and Tenant Act 1985 contains the right to know who the landlord it, that it is habitable, and that the landlord carries out basic repairs to the building and facility structure. However there is no housing regulator or watchdog to which tenants may apply, and so their rights have to be enforced through costly court processes. The Housing Act 1988 section 20 abolished security for tenants against eviction without good reasons (unless there is something in the contract), and so upon a contractual notice period tenants may be removed. The only statutory protection is a minimum of 4 weeks notice before eviction in the Protection from Eviction Act 1977 section 5(1), and the landlord may issue a section 21 notice under the Housing Act 1988 section 21 to being a court process of eviction. The Tenant Fees Act 2019 sections 1-5 contain minimal regulation of real estate agent fees, requiring that they are only charged to landlords, not tenants. The Housing Act 2004 sections 213-214 create a right for a rental deposit to be protected under a trust of a third party, however these parties are often appointed and paid by the landlord, meaning that in disputes that are arbitrated the landlord usually wins. By contrast, business tenancies have much more regulation, recognising the inherently unequal bargaining power that tenants have, and the failure of the market. On top of rents, and mortgage repayments for landowners, people must pay council tax and business rates to contribute to the locality for their property. Stamp duty in the United Kingdom is a tax that has to be paid upon the sale of property, and Inheritance Tax (United Kingdom) of 40% must be paid upon the passing to children or grandchildren of property worth over £500,000 in 2023, or £325,000 to other parties, but no tax for leaving a property to a spouse, civil partner or charity.

=== Agriculture and forestry ===
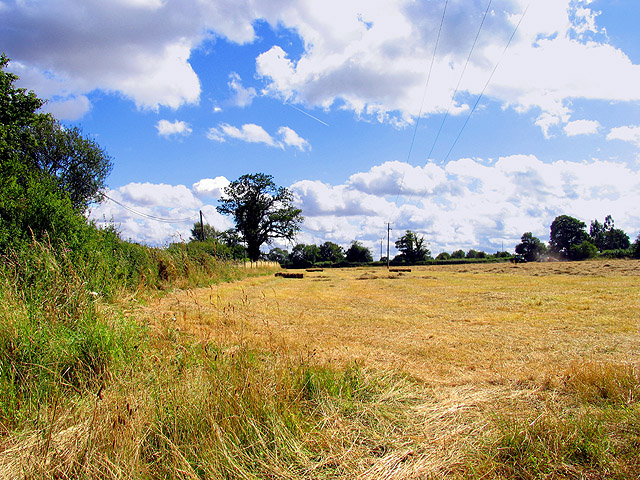
Agriculture covers 69% of UK land, accounted for 0.6% of UK GDP in 2010, employed 1.52% of the workforce, and generated £4.38 billion per year. There are 18.3 million hectares, or 45.2 million acres.

The UK is made up of around 72% farmland, and 13% woodland, and while agriculture and forestry compose a small percentage of the UK economy and workforce, its regulation has a large impact on the environment. The Common Agricultural Policy in European Union law regulated farming subsidies and development, and remains an influential part of the scheme in the Agriculture Act 2020. This enables the Secretary of State, and the Department for Environment, Food and Rural Affairs to give out financial assistance, make regulations on conditions attached to subsidies, and monitor actions for subsidies. From 2024, this may depart from the standard practice under the EU subsidy scheme of making (1) basic payments to famers based on the number of hectares actively farmed, (2) market measures to buy up and dispose of any excess produce, and (3) rural development payments for a range of spending, such as on clean energy or faster internet infrastructure. Around £3.5 billion was spent in 2018 under the CAP, although the UK government stated that this sums of money would change under the new system, based on a concept of "public money for public goods", but without much clarity.

Around 10% of UK land is held in the public sector, and the largest body among these is the Forestry Commission. The Forestry Act 1967 (c. 10) requires that the Forestry Commission has 11 members appointed by the government, and it has a general duty of "promoting the interests of forestry, the development of afforestation and the production and supply of timber and other forest products" including "adequate reserves of growing trees". National parks were created by the National Parks and Access to the Countryside Act 1949 for the first time, and today are overseen by Natural England or different park authorities under the National Parks (Scotland) Act 2000. Unlike other countries, UK national parks have substantial private ownership, but there are more restrictive planning laws to safeguard natural beauty, and guarantee public rights of way. General protection of the UK's environment is found in the Environmental Protection Act 1990 and Wildlife and Countryside Act 1981.

=== Gas, oil and coal ===
Coal, oil and gas from the UK's land and the North Sea still make up a large part of UK energy, despite the health, environmental, climate damage they cause. Over the Industrial Revolution, coal became the UK's dominant energy source, now governed under the Coal Industry Act 1994. Coal and oil production were publicly owned during the 20th century, but now coal, oil and gas extraction is performed today by private corporations under government licence. The largest entities include BP, Shell, joined by entirely foreign firms such as Apache, Talisman, CNR, TAQA or Cuadrilla. Under the Petroleum Act 1998 section 2, rights of land ownership do not equate to rights to oil and gas (or hydrocarbons) underneath. In Bocardo SA v Star Energy UK Onshore Ltd, the Supreme Court did hold that a landowner may sue a company for trespass if it drills under its land without permission, but a majority held that damages will be nominal. This meant that a landowner in Surrey was only able to recover £1,000 when a licensed oil company drilled a diagonal well 800 to 2,800 feet under its property, and not the £621,180 awarded by the High Court to reflect a share of the oil profits. Similarly, under the Continental Shelf Act 1964 section 1 rights "outside territorial waters with respect to the sea bed and subsoil and their natural resources" are "vested in Her Majesty." Since 1919, the Crown has prohibited searching and boring for oil and gas without a licence. Under the Energy Act 2016, licensing is managed by the Oil and Gas Authority (OGA). Under section 8, the OGA should hand out licences so as to minimise future public expense, secure the energy supply, ensure storage of carbon dioxide, fully collaborate with the UK government, encourage innovation, and encourage stable regulation to promote investment.

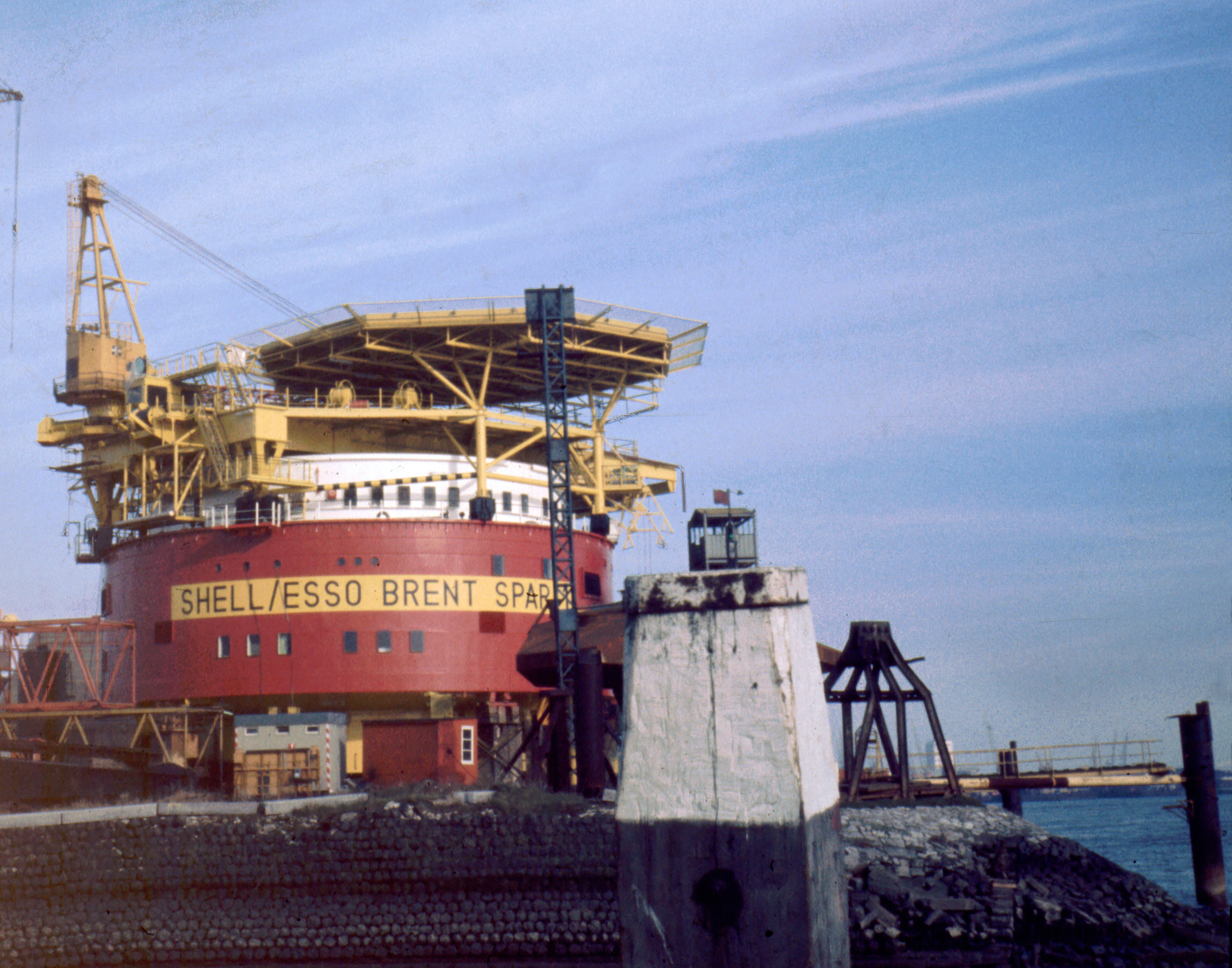
The Brent Spar oil storage buoy is one of 470 platforms and 5000 wells to be decommissioned, as resource companies promised in their licences. Companies have lobbied for tax cuts, meaning that taxpayers bear the costs.

A significant conflict in the law is the duty in Petroleum Act 1998 sections 9A-I on the Secretary of State for ‘maximising the economic recovery of UK petroleum’. This contradicts the goal of eliminating greenhouse gas emissions in section 1 of the Climate Change Act 2008. The Secretary of State may give directions to the OGA in the interests of national security, or the public in exceptional circumstances, while the OGA is nominally capable of funding itself through fees on licence applicants and holders. In the process of licensing, the Hydrocarbons Licensing Directive Regulations 1995 require objective, transparent and competitive criteria to be applied by the Oil and Gas Authority. Under regulation 3, the OGA should consider an applicant's technical and financial capability, price, previous conduct, and refuse all applications if none are satisfactory, while regulation 5 requires that all criteria to be applied are stated in the public notice for tenders. Under section 4 of the Petroleum Act 1998, model licence clauses are prescribed by the Secretary of State, for instance in the Petroleum Licensing (Production) (Seaward Areas) Regulations 2008. Schedule 1's model clauses give the OGA discretion over the licence term, the licensee's obligation to submit its work programme, revocation on breach of a licence, arbitration for disputes, or health and environmental safety. For onshore oil and gas extraction, and particularly hydraulic fracturing (or "fracking"), further requirements are to negotiate with landowners where a drill site is situated, get the local mineral planning authority's approval for exploratory wells, get consent from the council under the Town and Country Planning Act 1990 section 57, get permission for disposing of hazardous waste and inordinate water use, and finally get consent from the Department for Business, Energy and Industrial Strategy. In R (Frack Free Balcombe Residents Association) v West Sussex CC a residents association in Balcombe lost an action for judicial review of their council's planning permission for Cuadrilla Resources to explore the potential to frack for shale gas. Large protests had opposed any steps toward fracking. However, Gilbart J held that the council had not been wrong in refusing to consider public opposition, and took the view would have acted unlawfully if it had considered the opposition.

Although gas, oil and coal profits come from common property and public licensing, taxation on oil and gas outputs have been reduced. Initially, the Oil Taxation Act 1975 section 1 required a special Petroleum Revenue Tax, set as high as 75% of profits in 1983, but this ended for new licences after 1993, and then reduced from 50% in 2010, down to 0% in 2016. Under the Corporation Tax Act 2010 sections 272-279A there is still a "ring-fenced corporation tax", on individual fields that are ring-fenced from other activities, set at 30%, but just 19% for smaller fields. An additional "supplementary charge" of 10% of profits was introduced in 2002 to ensure a ‘fair return’ to the state, because ‘oil companies [were] generating excess profits’. Finally, under the Petroleum Act 1998 sections 29–45 require responsible decommissioning of oil and gas infrastructure. Under section 29, the Secretary of State can require a written notice of a decommissioning plan, on which stakeholders (e.g. the local community) must be consulted. Under section 30, notice regarding abandonment can be served on anyone who owns or has an interest in an installation. There are fines and offences for failure to comply. Estimates for the cost of decommissioning the UK's offshore platforms have been £16.9bn in the next decade, and £75bn to £100bn in total. A series of objections have been raised against the government's policy of cutting taxes while subsidising BP, Shell and Exxon for these costs.

== Theory ==
The theory of land law is closely connected to broader theories of property, given the historical importance of "real property" in the English social structure. First, there are theories about the extent to which private property should exist and the extent of public or social property, and second there are theories about what property is. In ancient Athens, according to Plato, in his ideal Republic everything should be owned in common, and "the notion of "private property" will have been by hook or crook completely eliminated from life". By contrast Aristotle argued that "Property should be in a certain sense common, but, as a general rule, private; for, when everyone has a distinct interest, men will not complain of one another, and they will make more progress, because every one will be attending to his own business". Whatever the theory, the laws of ancient Britain and medieval Europe concentrated all political power, and most property, in the hands of emperors and kings, but after the reinaissance writers began to challenge this premise. While Thomas Hobbes argued that a "leviathan" of a king should have total sovereign power to protect rights, John Locke argued that social relations should be based on a social contract where people agree to legislative power but only to protect their property and other rights - "lives, liberties and estates". Locke argued that private property was justly acquired through labour, "at least where there is enough, and as good, left in common for others." As colonies were established around the New World, dispossessing native peoples from their land, this proviso was often ignored in practice. Over the 18th century, philosophers and political economists expressed greater scepticisim. For instance, Adam Smith, a law professor in Glasgow, argued in The Wealth of Nations that "Civil government, so far as it is instituted for the security of property, is, in reality, instituted for the defence of the rich against the poor, or of those who have some property against those who have none at all." Communists in the 19th century argued for the abolition of private property in capital (or property used for production), and especially abolishing property of employers over the products of workers' labour. Socialists and social democrats preferred to advocate expansion of public property, in land but especially in large enterprises that were becoming the dominant sources of wealth. Despite the theory of Garrett Hardin that common property would be overused or squandered and result in "tragedy", modern empirical evidence particularly from Elinor Ostrom tended to show that public and community-managed resources would set up democratic governance structures that ensured they were well managed.

A second group of theories has focused on the legal nature of property, or what it is compared to other types of legal rule. Property was often said to be different from obligations, so that while property enabled the owner to exercise rights against the whole world, an obligation was exercisable only against individuals. This idea of a strict division is often seen to have collapsed over the 19th century as more social and legal change ensured greater rights for workers, tenants and traders relating to insolvent companies. A consensus grew that property rights in law established power relations between people, rather than merely being relations to inanimate objects, and that the benefits of public or private ownership depended on "which organization and motive can best do the work." A growing number of scholars also argued that property used for production (such as land with a factory or farm) differed from property used for consumption (such as a home) and so should be regulated differently: personal possessions that people consumed should be strictly protected, but property for production should be subject to greater social and public responsibilities. Over the 20th century these theories gradually came to prevail, reflected in more social ownership and regulation, although the interest groups arguing for privatisation and deregulation have persisted.

== See also ==
- English contract law
- English trusts law
- UK constitutional law
- EU law
- Glossary of land law
- Planning use classes in England
