= Jennings v Rice =

- Court: Court of Appeal
- Full case name: Anthony Clifford Jennings v Arthur T Rice, Janet Wilson, Linda A. Marsh, Peter L Norris, Arthur E Norris & Patricia M Reed
- Decided: 22 February 2002
- Citations: [2002] EWCA Civ 159 [2002] WTLR 367 [2003] 1 FCR 501 [2003] 1 P & CR 8 [2003] 1 P & CR 100
- Transcript: EWCA Civ 159 (bailii.org)

Case history
- Prior action: Appellant awarded £200,000 at first instance in the High Court before HHJ Weeks QC

Court membership
- Judges sitting: Aldous LJ; Mantell LJ; Walker LJ

Case opinions
- 'There is a clear line of authority from at least Crabb to the present day which establishes that once the elements of proprietary estoppel are established an equity arises. The value of that equity will depend upon all the circumstances including the expectation and the detriment. The task of the court is to do justice. The most essential requirement is that there must be proportionality between the expectation and the detriment.' Appeal dismissed 'with costs' (costs decision against the appellant)
- Decision by: Aldous LJ; Walker LJ
- Concurrence: Mantell LJ

Keywords
- Proprietary estoppel; quantum of award; carer and gardener; extent of detriment; estoppel based on words

Jennings v Rice (EWCA Civ 159; 2002) is an English land law case concerning proprietary estoppel.

== Facts ==
Mr Jennings, a self-employed bricklayer and part-time gardener, sued the administrator of his former employer, Mr. Arthur Thomas Rice, for a large house and furniture (worth £435,000) on the basis that he had been given an assurance he would get it. In 1970, Jennings began working for Mrs Royle as a gardener at her home at Lawn House in Shapwick, Somerset. As time went by, he began to run errands and carry out minor maintenance about the house. In the late 1980s, Mrs Royle stopped paying Mr. Jennings but provided him with £2,000 towards the purchase of his property. In the early 1990s, Mrs Royle became more dependent on Mr. Jennings as she became incapacitated with arthritis and leg ulcers. After a burglary in 1993, Mr. Jennings was persuaded to sleep overnight and eventually his responsibilities extended to helping her dress and go to the toilet, collecting her prescriptions and making sure she had enough food and drink available. Mr. Jennings also began to sleep in the house every night and continued to care for her until her death in August 1997, aged 93, without a will and without issue. After her death, Mr. Jennings continued to live in the house.

The judge held that in the late 1980s, Mr Jennings had challenged Mrs Royle about her failure to pay him and she assured him that he need not worry. She told him “he would be alright” and although Jennings' did not have a precise recollection of exact words, the thrust of the assurance was to the effect that “this will all be yours one day”. Jennings claimed that either he had: a claim under the Inheritance (Provision for Family and Dependants) Act 1975; or under a contract regarding land not falling foul of the Acts on formalities; or that he had a right to the house under the doctrine of proprietary estoppel. The administrator contested all three heads of claim.

The High Court awarded Jennings £200,000 taking into account the payments he had foregone, finding proprietary estoppel. It rejected his dependency claim, and stated that Royle's words had been too vague to make a contract or quasi-contract. The Court of Appeal approved the first instance decision on quantum:

The judge reminded himself that the house was valued at £420,000 and was not a suitable house for [Jennings] to live in on his own and he took into account that [Royle] had no special obligations to her family. He said that to reward an employee on the scale of £420,000 was excessive. He also compared the cost of full-time nursing care, which he estimated at £200,000, with the value of the house. He reasoned that [Jennings] would probably need £150,000 to buy a house. He concluded:

"I do not think that he could complain that he had been unfairly treated if he had been left £200,000 in [Royle]'s will. Most people would say that she would, at least, then have performed her promise to see him all right. The quality of her assurance affects not only questions of belief, encouragement, reliance and detriment, but also unconscionability and the extent of the equity.

In my judgment the minimum necessary to satisfy the equity in the present case is the sum of £200,000."

Jennings appealed to the Court of Appeal for the full value of the house (under the found proprietary estoppel). Rice for the statutory beneficiaries of the death estate argued including the nieces and nephews argued that instead of the full value of the house — the maximum awardable — the reviewing court should uphold the decision below which took into account the actual detriment experienced.

== Judgment ==
The Court of Appeal held that the High Court had made a correct assessment: proportionality was essential between expectation and detriment in deciding how to satisfy an equity based on proprietary estoppel. The detriment to Jennings was more difficult to establish than his expectation, however courts must consider unconscionability. Holding that the appeal should be dismissed, Robert Walker LJ's leading judgment reasoned:

42. This court was referred to two recent articles which contain a full and illuminating discussion of this area: Estoppel and the Protection of Expectations by Elizabeth Cooke [1997] 17 L.S.258 and The Remedial Discretion in Proprietary Estoppel by Simon Gardner (1999) 115 LQR 438. Those articles could with advantage have been cited in Gillett v Holt [2001] Ch 210. Both are concerned with whether the fundamental aim of this form of estoppel is to fulfil the claimant's expectations, or to compensate him for his detrimental reliance on the defendant's non-contractual assurances, or is some intermediate objective; and (following on from the identification of the correct principle) the nature of the discretion which the court exercises in granting a remedy to the claimant. The articles amply demonstrate that the range of English authorities provides some support for both theories and for a variety of intermediate positions; and that recent Australian authority (especially the decision of the High Court in Commonwealth v Verwayen (1990) 170 CLR 394) has moved in favour of the reliance loss theory.

43. It cannot be doubted that in this as in every other area of the law, the court must take a principled approach, and cannot exercise a completely unfettered discretion according to the individual judge's notion of what is fair in any particular case. Dr Gardner's fourth hypothesis ("the approach is for the court to adopt whatever style and measure of relief it thinks fit, for whatever reason it thinks fit") cannot be right. I do not think that the judgment of Hobhouse LJ in Sledmore v Dalby (1996) 72 P&CR 196 (to which I shall return) can possibly be regarded as adopting or advocating an unfettered judicial discretion.

44. The need to search for the right principles cannot be avoided. But it is unlikely to be a short or simple search, because (as appears from both the English and the Australian authorities) proprietary estoppel can apply in a wide variety of factual situations, and any summary formula is likely to prove to be an over-simplification. The cases show a wide range of variation in both of the main elements, that is the quality of the assurances which give rise to the claimant's expectations and the extent of the claimant's detrimental reliance on the assurances. The doctrine applies only if these elements, in combination, make it unconscionable for the person giving the assurances (whom I will call the benefactor, although that may not always be an appropriate label) to go back on them.

45. Sometimes the assurances, and the claimant's reliance on them, have a consensual character falling not far short of an enforceable contract (if the only bar to the formation of a contract is non-compliance with section 2 of the Law of Property (Miscellaneous Provisions) Act 1989, the proprietary estoppel may become indistinguishable from a constructive trust: Yaxley v Gotts [2000] Ch 162). In a case of that sort both the claimant's expectations and the element of detriment to the claimant will have been defined with reasonable clarity. A typical case would be an elderly benefactor who reaches a clear understanding with the claimant (who may be a relative, a friend, or a remunerated companion or carer) that if the claimant resides with and cares for the benefactor, the claimant will inherit the benefactor's house (or will have a home for life). In a case like that the consensual element of what has happened suggests that the claimant and the benefactor probably regarded the expected benefit and the accepted detriment as being (in a general, imprecise way) equivalent, or at any rate not obviously disproportionate. Cases of that sort, if free from other complications, fit fairly comfortably into Dr Gardner's first or second hypothesis (both of which aim to vindicate the claimant's expectations as far as possible, and if possible by providing the claimant with the specific property which the benefactor has promised).

46. However the claimant's expectations may not be focused on any specific property. In Re Basham [1986] 1 WLR 1489 the deputy judge (Mr Edward Nugee QC) rejected the submission that there must be some clearly identified piece of property, and that decision has been approved more than once in this court. Moreover (as the judge's findings in this case vividly illustrate) the claimant's expectations may have been formed on the basis of vague and inconsistent assurances. The judge said of Mrs Royle that she "... was prone to saying different things at different times and, perhaps deliberately, couched her promises in non-specific terms." He made that observation in relation to the failure of the contract claim, but it is relevant to the estoppel claim also.

47. If the claimant's expectations are uncertain (as will be the case with many honest claimants) then their specific vindication cannot be the appropriate test. A similar problem arises if the court, although satisfied that the claimant has a genuine claim, is not satisfied that the high level of the claimant's expectations is fairly derived from his deceased patron's assurances, which may have justified only a lower level of expectation. In such cases the court may still take the claimant's expectations (or the upper end of any range of expectations) as a starting point, but unless constrained by authority I would regard it as no more than a starting point.

48. I do not see that approach as being inconsistent with authority. On the contrary, I think it is supported by a substantial body of English authority. Scarman LJ's well-known reference to "the minimum equity to do justice to the plaintiff" (Crabb v Arun District Council [1976] Ch 179, 198) must no doubt be read in the context of the rather unusual facts of that case, but it does not stand alone. As Scarman LJ recognised, the line of authority goes back to nineteenth-century cases such as Duke of Beaufort v Patrick (1853) 17 Beav.60 and Plimmer v Wellington Corporation (1884) 9 App Cas 699. A passage in the opinion of the Privy Council (delivered by Sir Arthur Hobhouse) in Plimmer's case at pp.713-4 is particularly instructive. The conclusion of the passage is that "In fact the court must look at the circumstances in each case to decide in what way the equity can be satisfied". Scarman LJ's reference to the minimum does not require the court to be constitutionally parsimonious, but it does implicitly recognise that the court must also do justice to the defendant.

49. It is no coincidence that these statements of principle refer to satisfying the equity (rather than satisfying, or vindicating, the claimant's expectations). The equity arises not from the claimant's expectations alone, but from the combination of expectations, detrimental reliance, and the unconscionableness of allowing the benefactor (or the deceased benefactor's estate) to go back on the assurances. There is a faint parallel with the old equitable doctrine of part performance, of which Lord Selborne said in Maddison v Alderson (1883) 8 App Cas 467, 475, "In a suit founded on such part performance, the defendant is really ' charged' upon the equities resulting from the acts done in execution of the contract, and not (within the meaning of the statute) upon the contract itself." So with proprietary estoppel the defendant is charged with satisfying the equity which has arisen from the whole sequence of events. But the parallel is only faint since in the case of estoppel there is no contract and the nexus between the benefactor's assurances and the resulting equity is less direct; the assurances are only half the story. In Dillwyn v Llewelyn (1862) 4 De G F & J 517, 522 Lord Westbury expressed the point in terms which anticipated Lord Selborne: "The equity of the donee and the estate to be claimed by virtue of it depend on the transaction, that is, on the acts done, and not on the language of the memorandum [which amounted to an imperfect gift]."

50. To recapitulate: there is a category of case in which the benefactor and the claimant have reached a mutual understanding which is in reasonably clear terms but does not amount to a contract. I have already referred to the typical case of a carer who has the expectation of coming into the benefactor's house, either outright or for life. In such a case the court's natural response is to fulfil the claimant's expectations. But if the claimant's expectations are uncertain, or extravagant, or out of all proportion to the detriment which the claimant has suffered, the court can and should recognise that the claimant's equity should be satisfied in another (and generally more limited) way.

51. But that does not mean that the court should in such a case abandon expectations completely, and look to the detriment suffered by the claimant as defining the appropriate measure of relief. Indeed in many cases the detriment may be even more difficult to quantify, in financial terms, than the claimant's expectations. Detriment can be quantified with reasonable precision if it consists solely of expenditure on improvements to another person's house, and in some cases of that sort an equitable charge for the expenditure may be sufficient to satisfy the equity (see Snell's Equity 30th ed para 39-21 and the authorities mentioned in that paragraph). But the detriment of an ever- increasing burden of care for an elderly person, and of having to be subservient to his or her moods and wishes, is very difficult to quantify in money terms. Moreover the claimant may not be motivated solely by reliance on the benefactor's assurances, and may receive some countervailing benefits (such as free bed and board). In such circumstances the court has to exercise a wide judgmental discretion.

52. It would be unwise to attempt any comprehensive enumeration of the factors relevant to the exercise of the court's discretion, or to suggest any hierarchy of factors. In my view they include, but are not limited to, the factors mentioned in Dr Gardner's third hypothesis (misconduct of the claimant as in J Willis & Sons v Willis [1979] Ch 261 or particularly oppressive conduct on the part of the defendant, as in Crabb v Arun District Council or Pascoe v Turner [1979] 1 WLR 431). To these can safely be added the court's recognition that it cannot compel people who have fallen out to live peaceably together, so that there may be a need for a clean break; alterations in the benefactor's assets and circumstances, especially where the benefactor's assurances have been given, and the claimant's detriment has been suffered, over a long period of years; the likely effect of taxation; and (to a limited degree) the other claims (legal or moral) on the benefactor or his or her estate. No doubt there are many other factors which it may be right for the court to take into account in particular factual situations.

53. The judge did in this case consider, although not in detail, what Mr Jennings might reasonably have earned in the way of arm's length remuneration for his services. He also considered what professional nursing care might have cost during the last eight years of Mrs Royle's life. A detailed computational approach was adopted (but with a different outcome, limited to compensation of reliance loss) by the Supreme Court of Tasmania in Public Trustee v Wadley [1997] 7 Tas. LR 35 in which the court discussed the appropriate hourly rate and the total number of hours of housework undertaken by a daughter who (as it was put in the dissenting judgment of Wright J) "had subordinated her own life to that of her father and [whose] attentive and affectionate service, often no doubt at considerable inconvenience to herself, put her assistance on a higher plane than that of a domestic servant".

54. That illustrates the Australian preference for compensating the reliance loss only. Under English law that approach may sometimes be appropriate (see paragraph 51 above) but only where, on the facts, a higher measure would amount to overcompensation. In my view it would rarely if ever be appropriate to go into detailed inquiries as to hours and hourly rates where the claim was based on proprietary estoppel (rather than a restitutionary claim for services which were not gratuitous). But the going rate for live-in carers can provide a useful cross-check in the exercise of the court's discretion.

55. I have made some references to the general trend of Australian jurisprudence in this area. It is unnecessary to attempt any detailed study of the different views expressed by the High Court in the Verwayen case (which was concerned with estoppel in the very different context of litigation arising out of personal injuries suffered in a collision between two warships) or of Australian cases since then.

56. However I respectfully agree with the view expressed by Hobhouse LJ in Sledmore v Dalby (1996) 72 P&CR 196, that the principle of proportionality (between remedy and detriment), emphasised by Mason CJ in Verwayen, is relevant in England also. As Hobhouse LJ observed at p.209, to recognise the need for proportionality "... is to say little more than that the end result must be a just one having regard to the assumption made by the party asserting the estoppel and the detriment which he has experienced." The essence of the doctrine of proprietary estoppel is to do what is necessary to avoid an unconscionable result, and a disproportionate remedy cannot be the right way of going about that. Cases on interim injunctive relief have recognised the importance of proportionality in the granting of equitable remedies: see for instance Lock International v Beswick [1989] 1 WLR 1268, 1281. Where the court is granting final relief after investigating all the facts proportionality is even more important.

57. I do not consider that the judge made any error of law in his approach to the exercise of his discretion, or that it was otherwise flawed. He did make an error in his reference to the quantum of the relief granted in Gillett v Holt (the claimant was awarded a farmhouse and 42 hectares of land as well as £ 100,000). But every case depends on its own facts and that slip cannot in my view have played a significant part in the judge's disposal of the case.

58. I would therefore dismiss this appeal.

== See also ==
- English contract law
