= Greasley v Cooke =

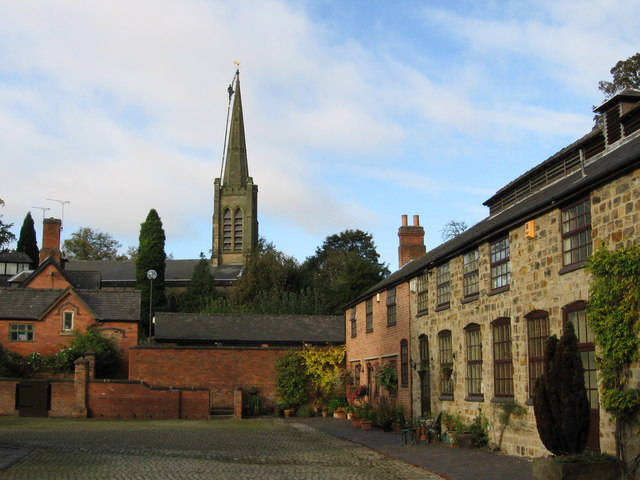
- Court: Court of Appeal
- Decided: 18 June 1980
- Citation: [1980] 3 All ER 710, [1980] 1 WLR 1306

Court membership
- Judges sitting: Lord Denning MR, Waller LJ and Dunn LJ

Keywords
- Contract, proprietary estoppel, deed, imperfect gift

Greasley v Cooke [1980] 3 All ER 710 is an English land law case concerning proprietary estoppel.

== Facts ==
Kenneth and Hedley Greasley owned a house on 32 George Street, Riddings in Derbyshire. Doris Cooke moved in DURING 1938 as a maid for Hedley, and became Kenneth’s partner, and both had assured her she would have a 'home for life'. When Kenneth died, he left nothing. Cooke stayed there after 1975, and had received no payment since 1948. The new owners of the house wanted to remove her. She did not look for another job, and stayed in the house looking after Kenneth and his mentally ill sister, Clarice.Cooke claimed proprietary estoppel, and to stay in the house. The claimants did not show for the proceedings.

== Judgment ==
Lord Denning MR held that Ms Cooke did not have to prove reliance, and would assume she had acted to her detriment. His decision went as follows.

The first point is on the burden of proof. Mr. Weeks referred us to many cases, such as Reynell v. Sprye (1852) 1 De G. M. & G. 660, 708; Smith v. Chadwick (1882) 20 Ch.D. 27, 44 and Brikom Investments Ltd. v. Carr [1979] Q.B. 467, 482–483 where I said that when a person makes a representation intending that another should act on it:

“It is no answer for the maker to say: ‘You would have gone on with the transaction anyway.’ That must be mere speculation. No one can be sure what he would, or would not, have done in a hypothetical state of affairs which never took place. … Once it is shown that a representation was calculated to influence the judgment of a reasonable man, the presumption is that he was so influenced.”

So here. These statements to Miss Cooke were calculated to influence her — so as to put her mind at rest — so that she should not worry about being turned out. No one can say what she would have done if Kenneth and Hedley had not made those statements. It is quite possible that she would have said to herself:

“I am not married to Kenneth. I am on my own. What will happen to me if anything happens to him? I had better look out for another job now: rather than stay here where I have no security.”

So, instead of looking for another job, she stayed on in the house looking after Kenneth and Clarice. There is a presumption that she did so, relying on the assurances given to her by Kenneth and Hedley. The burden is not on her, but on them, to prove that she did not rely on their assurances. They did not prove it, nor did their representatives. So she is presumed to have relied on them. So on the burden of proof it seems to me that the judge was in error.

The second point is about the need for some expenditure of money — some detriment — before a person can acquire any interest in a house or any right to stay in it as long as he wishes. It so happens that in many of these cases of proprietary estoppel there has been expenditure of money. But that is not a necessary element. I see that in Snell's Principles of Equity, 27th ed. (1973), p. 565, it is said: “A must have incurred expenditure or otherwise have prejudiced himself.” But I do not think that that is necessary. It is sufficient if the party, to whom the assurance is given, acts on the faith of it — in such circumstances that it would be unjust and inequitable for the party making the assurance to go back on it: see Moorgate Mercantile Co. Ltd. v. Twitchings [1976] Q.B. 225 and Crabb v Arun District Council [1976] Ch. 179, 188. Applying those principles here it can be seen that the assurances given by Kenneth and Hedley to Doris Cooke — leading her to believe that she would be allowed to stay in the house as long as she wished — raised an equity in her favour. There was no need for her to prove that she acted on the faith of those assurances. It is to be presumed that she did so. There is no need for her to prove that she acted to her detriment or to her prejudice. Suffice it that she stayed on the house — looking after Kenneth and Clarice — when otherwise she might have left and got a job elsewhere. The equity having thus been raised in her favour, it is for the courts of equity to decide in what way that equity should be satisfied. In this case it should be by allowing her to stay on in the house as long as she wishes.

== See also ==
- English contract law
- English land law
- Inwards v Baker [1965] 2 QB 29.
- Willmott v Barber (1880) 15 Ch D 96, Fry J said proprietary estoppel requires a mistake about rights, reliance, defendant has knowledge of his own right, know of the claimant's mistaken belief and have encouraged reliance
