= Taylor Fashions Ltd v Liverpool Victoria Trustees Co Ltd =

Taylor Fashions v Liverpool Victoria Trustees
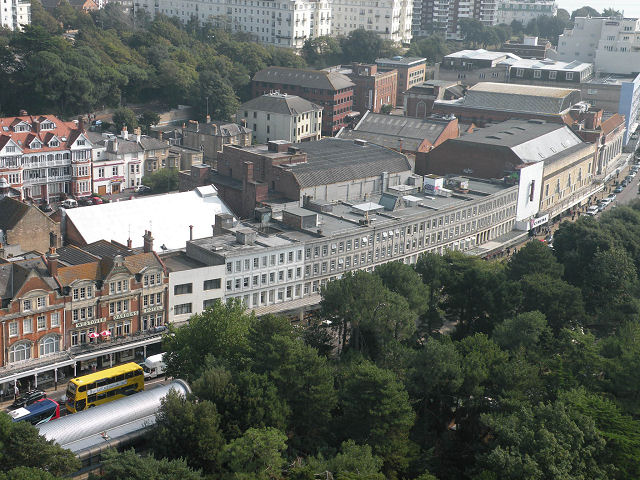
- Westover Road, Bournemouth
- Court: High Court, Chancery Division
- Full case name: Taylor Fashions v Liverpool Victoria Friendly Society and Old & Campbell v Liverpool Victoria Friendly Society
- Decided: 27 February 1979
- Citations: [1979] EWHC Ch 1; 251 EG 159 [1981] 1 All ER 897 [1981] 2 WLR 576 [1982] QB 133

Case opinions
- Decision by: Oliver J

Keywords
- Proprietary estoppel; no statutory right to renew business lease; common mistake; extent of unconscionability required for estoppel

Taylor Fashions Ltd and Old & Campbell Ltd v Liverpool Victoria Trustees Co Ltd [1979] is a leading case in English land law on proprietary estoppel. Due to a common mistake and no element of enticement to believe that mistake, estoppel was not available on the facts.

== Facts ==
The claimants were two companies, Taylor Fashions Ltd and Old & Campbell Ltd, who held leases on two business premises on Westover Road, Bournemouth. Both companies asked to have their leases renewed by their landlord, the Liverpool Victoria Trustees Co Ltd. All parties had assumed that the two leases were accompanied by a statutory right of renew when they came to an end. Based on this assumption, both of the claimant companies had spent money improving their premises. However, it transpired that Liverpool Victoria was under no legal obligation to renew. The claimants argued that Liverpool Victoria should be estopped from not renewing, based on their reliance. In response, Liverpool Victoria argued that estoppel was not relevant because they had not acted unconscionably but simply by mistake.

== Judgment ==
Oliver J noted that Mr Scott and Mr Essayan for the claimants said: one’s state of mind was irrelevant. Mr Millett for Liverpool Victoria argued that unconscionability was necessary, following Fry J in the earlier leading case of Willmott v Barber. The judge noted:

in a case of mere passivity, it is readily intelligible that there must be shown a duty to speak, protest or interfere which cannot normally arise in the absence of knowledge or at least a suspicion of the true position [...]

Furthermore the more recent cases indicate, in my judgment, that the application of the Ramsden v Dyson LR 1 HL 129 principle – whether you call it proprietary estoppel, estoppel by acquiescence or estoppel by encouragement is really immaterial – requires a very much broader approach which is directed rather at ascertaining whether, in particular individual circumstances, it would be unconscionable for a party to be permitted to deny that which, knowingly, or unknowingly, he has allowed or encouraged another to assume to his detriment than to enquiring whether the circumstances can be fitted within the confines of some preconceived formula serving as a universal yardstick for every form of unconscionable behaviour [...]

The inquiry which I have to make therefore, as it seems to me, is simply whether, in all the circumstances of this case, it was unconscionable for the defendants to seek to take advantage of the mistake which, at the material time, everybody shared, and, in approaching that, I must consider the cases of the two plaintiffs separately because it may be that quite different considerations apply to each.

Oliver J clarified that Willmott was only a case applicable to situations where someone had stood by without protest as his rights were infringed. Knowledge of one of the parties alleged to be estopped is just one of many relevant factors. One should consider all the circumstances. On the facts of the case, the claim by Taylor Fashions failed, with 'regret', because they had not been encouraged in their belief by Liverpool Victoria. Old & Campbell, however, did succeed because they had been encouraged to spend a very large sum in the belief that they could renew.

== Significance ==
The case underlines the importance of businesses renting leased premises to be well-advised before entering into their leases, and in particular to be aware of the pitfall of doing authorised works without business security of tenure.

It also underlines the importance of clear communication with the landlord as a clear written promise from the landlord that the business tenants could renew their premises leases, having looked at the leases, would have enabled the business tenants to benefit somewhat from the works they had carried out.

== See also ==
- Estoppel
