= Thorner v Major =

- Court: House of Lords
- Full case name: Thorner (Appellant) v Major and others (Respondents)
- Decided: 25/03/2009
- Citation: [2009] UKHL 18, [2009] 1 WLR 776
- Transcript: http://www.bailii.org/uk/cases/UKHL/2009/18.html

Court membership
- Judges sitting: Lord Hoffmann, Lord Scott of Foscote, Lord Rodger of Earlsferry, Lord Walker of Gestingthorpe, Lord Neuberger

Keywords
- Proprietary estoppel

Thorner v Major [2009] UKHL 18 is an English land law case, concerning proprietary estoppel.

== Facts ==
On Peter Thorner's Steart Farm, Cheddar, Somerset, David Thorner, second cousin, worked for Peter for 30 years unpaid, as well as on his parents’ farm, where he got housing and money. He worked long hours and believed he would inherit the farm, encouraged by Peter's conduct over 15 years, such as in 1990 giving a bonus relating to two assurance policies, saying ‘That’s for my death duties.’ But there was no explicit promise or assurance. Peter left the farm to David, and also money to others. But Peter destroyed the will when he fell out with the others and did not make a new will. So, Peter died intestate the property, by statute, would have passed to others. David claimed proprietary estoppel.

The Court of Appeal (Lloyd LJ, Ward LJ and Rimer LJ) held David had no proprietary estoppel claim because there was never a clear and unequivocal assurance.

John Randall QC held David had a right to Steart Farm.

== Judgment ==
The House of Lords held that the only thing that mattered was whether a reasonable person could have relied on the conduct that looked like an assurance.

Lord Hoffmann said that speaking in oblique and allusive terms does not matter if one could reasonably believe one was being given an assurance. What mattered was whether Peter's conduct ‘would reasonably have been understood as intended to be taken seriously as an assurance which could be relied upon’. There was no requirement that Peter intended David to rely on him.

8. There was a close and ongoing daily relationship between the parties. Past events provide context and background for the interpretation of subsequent events and subsequent events throw retrospective light upon the meaning of past events. The owl of Minerva spreads its wings only with the falling of the dusk. The finding was that David reasonably relied upon the assurance from 1990, even if it required later events to confirm that it was reasonable for him to have done so.

Lord Scott held to the view that proprietary estoppel can only be used where the assurer believes they have or will have very soon acquired a right in someone's land. He said though he would not disagree about proprietary estoppel, he would ‘find it easier and more comfortable to regard David’s equity as established via a remedial constructive trust.’ The elements of a claim are clear assurance, reasonable reliance, substantial detriment. Proprietary estoppel brings uncertain results, e.g. if Peter intended to give up the farm, but before then had wanted to use the farm as a home given his old age. Cases like Ramsden and Crabb can easily be understood as proprietary estoppel, but he finds inheritance cases easier to understand as being remedied through a remedial constructive trust, created by the parties’ common intention, since Gissing. Like Gillett.

Lord Walker held the elements for a proprietary estoppel are (1) a promise or representation by the defendant that the claimant has or will acquire some right in relation to the defendant's land (2) the claimant's reasonable reliance on this promise/representation (3) detriment suffered by the claimant by reason of his reliance on that promise/representation.

Lord Neuberger, agreed with Lord Walker, but wished to state the result in his own words.

84. ... Just as a sentence can have one meaning in one context and a very different meaning in another context, so can a sentence, which would be ambiguous or unclear in one context, be a clear and unambiguous assurance in another context. Indeed, as Lord Walker says, the point is underlined by the fact that perhaps the classic example of proprietary estoppel is based on silence and inaction, rather than any statement or action - see per Lord Eldon LC ("knowingly, though but passively") in Dann v Spurrier (1802) 7 Ves 231, 235-6 and per Lord Kingsdown ("with the knowledge … and without objection ") in Ramsden v Dyson LR 1 HL 129, 170.

85. Secondly, it would be quite wrong to be unrealistically rigorous when applying the "clear and unambiguous" test. The court should not search for ambiguity or uncertainty, but should assess the question of clarity and certainty practically and sensibly, as well as contextually. Again, this point is underlined by the authorities, namely those cases I have referred to in para 78 above, which support the proposition that, at least normally, it is sufficient for the person invoking the estoppel to establish that he reasonably understood the statement or action to be an assurance on which he could rely.

86. Thirdly, as pointed out in argument by my noble and learned friend Lord Rodger of Earlsferry, there may be cases where the statement relied on to found an estoppel could amount to an assurance which could reasonably be understood as having more than one possible meaning. In such a case, if the facts otherwise satisfy all the requirements of an estoppel, it seems to me that, at least normally, the ambiguity should not deprive a person who reasonably relied on the assurance of all relief: it may well be right, however, that he should be accorded relief on the basis of the interpretation least beneficial to him.

87. It was also argued for the respondents that, if there was an estoppel as the Deputy Judge had decided, difficulties could have arisen if Peter had changed his mind before he died. The short answer to that argument is, of course, that Peter's intention that David should inherit the farm appears never to have changed: Peter certainly never communicated to David or to anyone else that he had changed that intention. On the contrary: in 2002, twelve years after the original commitment and three years before he died, Peter was still making it clear to his solicitor, in David's presence, that David would inherit the farm (saying that "we" wanted the deeds in one place as it "would be better" for David). Thus, for at least fifteen years from 1990 to 2005, through assurances made from time to time, Peter made it clear to David that he would inherit the farm on Peter's death, and, up to, indeed at, the moment that those assurances fell to be fulfilled, they remained in force.

88. I should add that, if Peter had changed his mind before he died, the question as to what, if any, relief should have been accorded to David would have been a matter for the court, to be assessed by reference to all the facts. An example of such a case is Gillett v Holt [2001] Ch 210, where my noble and learned friend, then Robert Walker LJ, had to consider just such an issue, and did so in a masterly judgment, to which I shall have to revert on the second issue on this appeal.

89. Before turning to that second issue, I should add that, even if Peter's "implicit statement" may have been revocable, as the Court of Appeal thought, I should not be taken as accepting that it would necessarily follow that, once the statement had been maintained by Peter and acted on by David for a substantial period, it would have been open to Peter freely to go back on it. It may be that he could not have done so, at least without paying David appropriate compensation, unless the change of mind was attributable to, and could be justified by, a change of circumstances. It seems to me that it would be arguable that, even assuming that the "implicit statement" was not irrevocable, if, say in 2004, Peter had changed his mind, David would nonetheless have been entitled to equitable relief, in the light of his fourteen or more years of unpaid work on the farm. It is not as if Peter had given any sort of clear indication that statement was revocable. The Court of Appeal considered that it was not clear that the statement was irrevocable, not that it was clear that the statement was revocable. However, that point does not arise for decision in the present case, and I shall say no more about it.

Uncertainty as to the extent of the property

90. Based on the reasoning of my noble and learned friend, Lord Scott of Foscote in Cobbe v Yeoman's Row Management Ltd [2008] UKHL 55, [2008] 1 WLR 1752, paras 18-20 and 28, the respondents contend that the identity of the property the subject of the assurance or statement relied on to found a proprietary estoppel must be "certain". Accordingly, they argue, even if David would otherwise make good his proprietary estoppel claim, it must fail because the property the subject of the alleged estoppel in this case is not certain enough.

91. So far as the relevant facts of this case are concerned, the extent of the land owned and farmed by Peter varied. When he inherited Steart Farm in 1976, it comprised about 350 acres of freehold low-lying pasture and rough grazing. In 1990, he sold a large field for development, and used the proceeds to buy more land, so that, by 1992, he owned 463 acres, and the farm included another 120 acres which Peter rented. By 1998, he was farming only some 160 acres of that land himself, having let out the remainder on farm business tenancies. As at the date of his death, Peter was in the process of negotiating a sale of some 6 acres to developers.

92. In Cobbe [2008] 1 WLR 1752, Mr Cobbe devoted considerable time, effort, and expertise to obtaining planning permission for land owned by Yeoman's Row. Although they reached an oral "agreement in principle", the parties had decided not to enter into a contract, but Mr Cobbe went ahead on the basis, as appreciated by Yeoman's Row, that he expected them to do so once planning permission was obtained. Initially, this was also the intention of Yeoman's Row, but their intention changed about three months before planning permission was obtained, although they did not tell Mr Cobbe until afterwards. Mr Cobbe's estoppel claim failed (although he was entitled to a quantum meruit payment). As I see it, Mr Cobbe's claim failed because he was effectively seeking to invoke proprietary estoppel to give effect to a contract which the parties had intentionally and consciously not entered into, and because he was simply seeking a remedy for the unconscionable behaviour of Yeoman's Row.

93. In the context of a case such as Cobbe [2008] 1 WLR 1752, it is readily understandable why Lord Scott considered the question of certainty was so significant. The parties had intentionally not entered into any legally binding arrangement while Mr Cobbe sought to obtain planning permission: they had left matters on a speculative basis, each knowing full well that neither was legally bound - see [2008] 1 WLR 1752, para 27. There was not even an agreement to agree (which would have been unenforceable), but, as Lord Scott pointed out, merely an expectation that there would be negotiations. And, as he said, at [2008] 1 WLR 1752, para 18, an "expectation dependent upon the conclusion of a successful negotiation is not an expectation of an interest having [sufficient] certainty".

94. There are two fundamental differences between that case and this case. First, the nature of the uncertainty in the two cases is entirely different. It is well encapsulated by Lord Walker's distinction between "intangible legal rights" and "the tangible property which he or she expects to get", in Cobbe [2008] 1 WLR 1752, para 68. In that case, there was no doubt about the physical identity of the property. However, there was total uncertainty as to the nature or terms of any benefit (property interest, contractual right, or money), and, if a property interest, as to the nature of that interest (freehold, leasehold, or charge), to be accorded to Mr Cobbe.

95. In this case, the extent of the farm might change, but, on the Deputy Judge's analysis, there is, as I see it, no doubt as to what was the subject of the assurance, namely the farm as it existed from time to time. Accordingly, the nature of the interest to be received by David was clear: it was the farm as it existed on Peter's death. As in the case of a very different equitable concept, namely a floating charge, the property the subject of the equity could be conceptually identified from the moment the equity came into existence, but its precise extent fell to be determined when the equity crystallised, namely on Peter's death.

96. Secondly, the analysis of the law in Cobbe [2008] 1 WLR 1752 was against the background of very different facts. The relationship between the parties in that case was entirely arm's length and commercial, and the person raising the estoppel was a highly experienced businessman. The circumstances were such that the parties could well have been expected to enter into a contract, however, although they discussed contractual terms, they had consciously chosen not to do so. They had intentionally left their legal relationship to be negotiated, and each of them knew that neither of them was legally bound. What Mr Cobbe then relied on was "an unformulated estoppel ... asserted in order to protect [his] interest under an oral agreement for the purchase of land that lacked both the requisite statutory formalities … and was, in a contractual sense, incomplete" - [2008] 1 WLR 1752, para 18.

97. In this case, by contrast, the relationship between Peter and David was familial and personal, and neither of them, least of all David, had much commercial experience. Further, at no time had either of them even started to contemplate entering into a formal contract as to the ownership of the farm after Peter's death. Nor could such a contract have been reasonably expected even to be discussed between them. On the Deputy Judge's findings, it was a relatively straightforward case: Peter made what were, in the circumstances, clear and unambiguous assurances that he would leave his farm to David, and David reasonably relied on, and reasonably acted to his detriment on the basis of, those assurances, over a long period.

98. In these circumstances, I see nothing in the reasoning of Lord Scott in Cobbe [2008] 1 WLR 1752 which assists the respondents in this case. It would represent a regrettable and substantial emasculation of the beneficial principle of proprietary estoppel if it were artificially fettered so as to require the precise extent of the property the subject of the alleged estoppel to be strictly defined in every case. Concentrating on the perceived morality of the parties' behaviour can lead to an unacceptable degree of uncertainty of outcome, and hence I welcome the decision in Cobbe [2008] 1 WLR 1752. However, it is equally true that focussing on technicalities can lead to a degree of strictness inconsistent with the fundamental aims of equity.

99. The notion that much of the reasoning in Cobbe [2008] 1 WLR 1752 was directed to the unusual facts of that case is supported by the discussion at para 29 relating to section 2 of the Law of Property (Miscellaneous Provisions) Act 1989. Section 2 may have presented Mr Cobbe with a problem, as he was seeking to invoke an estoppel to protect a right which was, in a sense, contractual in nature (see the passage quoted at the end of para 96 above), and section 2 lays down formalities which are required for a valid "agreement" relating to land. However, at least as at present advised, I do not consider that section 2 has any impact on a claim such as the present, which is a straightforward estoppel claim without any contractual connection. It was no doubt for that reason that the respondents, rightly in my view, eschewed any argument based on section 2.

== See also ==
- English land law
- English trusts law
- English property law
