= Peter Oliver, Baron Oliver of Aylmerton =

British judge (1921–2007)

The Right Honourable The Lord Oliver of Aylmerton PC
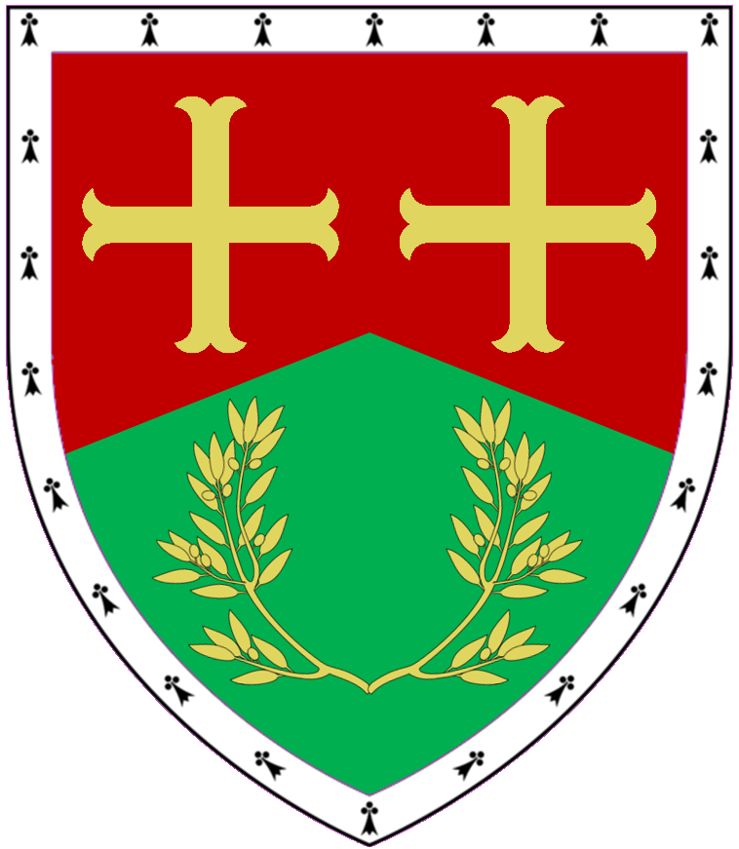

Lord of Appeal in Ordinary
- In office 31 January 1986 – 31 December 1991
- Monarch: Elizabeth II
- Succeeded by: The Lord Mustill

Lord Justice of Appeal

Justice of the High Court

Member of the House of Lords
- Lord Temporal
- Lord of Appeal in Ordinary; 31 January 1986 – 17 October 2007

Personal details
- Born: Peter Raymond Oliver; 7 March 1921
- Died: 17 October 2007 (aged 86)
- Spouses: Mary Chichester Rideal (m. 1945; died 1985); Wendy Anne Lloyd Jones (née Harrison) (m. 1987)
- Children: Two children (by first wife)
- Education: Trinity Hall, Cambridge
- Occupation: Judge
- Profession: Law

Peter Raymond Oliver, Baron Oliver of Aylmerton, PC (7 March 1921 – 17 October 2007) was a British barrister and judge who served as a Lord of Appeal in Ordinary between 1986 and 1991. The son of an academic lawyer, he served with distinction during the Second World War, before joining the Chancery bar. He was appointed to the High Court in 1974, to the Court of Appeal in 1980, and to the House of Lords in 1986, having earlier been tipped to succeed Lord Denning as Master of the Rolls in 1982. He retired in 1992, and in later life suffered from loss of sight.

== Biography ==
Oliver was born in Cambridge, where his father, David Thomas Oliver, was a professor of law and fellow of Trinity Hall, Cambridge. He was educated at The Leys School, Cambridge and Trinity Hall, Cambridge, graduating with a starred First in law in 1941. He later became an honorary fellow of Trinity Hall, and became University Commissary. From 1941 to 1945, he served in the 12th Battalion Royal Tank Regiment, and was mentioned in dispatches during his service in Italy. He was Honorary President of the Cambridge University Law Society.

Oliver was called to the Bar at Lincoln's Inn in 1948, and became a chancery barrister. He became a Queen's Counsel in 1965, a bencher at Lincoln's Inn in 1973. He was knighted one year later, when he was appointed a Judge of the High Court in the Chancery Division. Between 1976 and 1980, he was a member of the Restrictive Practices Court. He was chairman of the Review Body on the Chancery Division from 1979 to 1981, recommending many changes to modernise its practice.

He became a Privy Counsellor in 1980, when he was promoted to become a Lord Justice of Appeal. He joined with Lord Denning in ruling that the Greater London Council's "Fares Fair" policy was illegal (a decision which was later upheld by the House of Lords). He was a leading contender to succeed Lord Denning as Master of the Rolls on his retirement in 1982, but the post went to Sir John Donaldson instead. In 1986, Oliver was appointed a Lord of Appeal in Ordinary, and was created a life peer with the title Baron Oliver of Aylmerton, of Aylmerton in the County of Norfolk. He joined the minority in the House of Lords judgment in the Spycatcher case in 1987, in favour of lifting the ban on its publication.

He retired as Lord of Appeal in 1992. In later life, he lost his sight due to macular degeneration.

Lord Oliver married twice, firstly Mary Chichester Rideal in 1945. They had a son and a daughter. After her death in 1985, he married secondly Wendy Anne Lloyd Jones (née Harrison) in 1987. He was survived by his second wife, and the two children from his first marriage.

== Notable cases ==
- Taylor Fashions v Liverpool Victoria Trustees (1979), a leading case of proprietary estoppel.
- Alcock v Chief Constable of South Yorkshire Police (1991), a leading case on psychiatric harm in tort.
- Caparo v Dickman [1990] 2 AC 605, a case which established the Caparo consideration in determining a duty of care in tort.

== Arms ==
Coat of arms of Peter Oliver, Baron Oliver of Aylmerton

Crest
Within a crown pallisado Or a grassy mount thereon a representation of the tower of the Church of St John the Baptist at Aylmerton Proper issuing therefrom a cubit arm Proper holding a crescent Ermine.
Escutcheon
Per chevron Gules and Vert in chief two crosses moline Or and in base a chaplet of olive also Or a bordure Ermine.
Supporters
Dexter: A lion Purpure the dexter paw in a mail gauntlet Argent; Sinister: An American bald-headed eagle holding in the dexter claw a quill pen all Proper.
Motto
Trwy Weithred Y Dysgir
