= Pascoe v Turner =

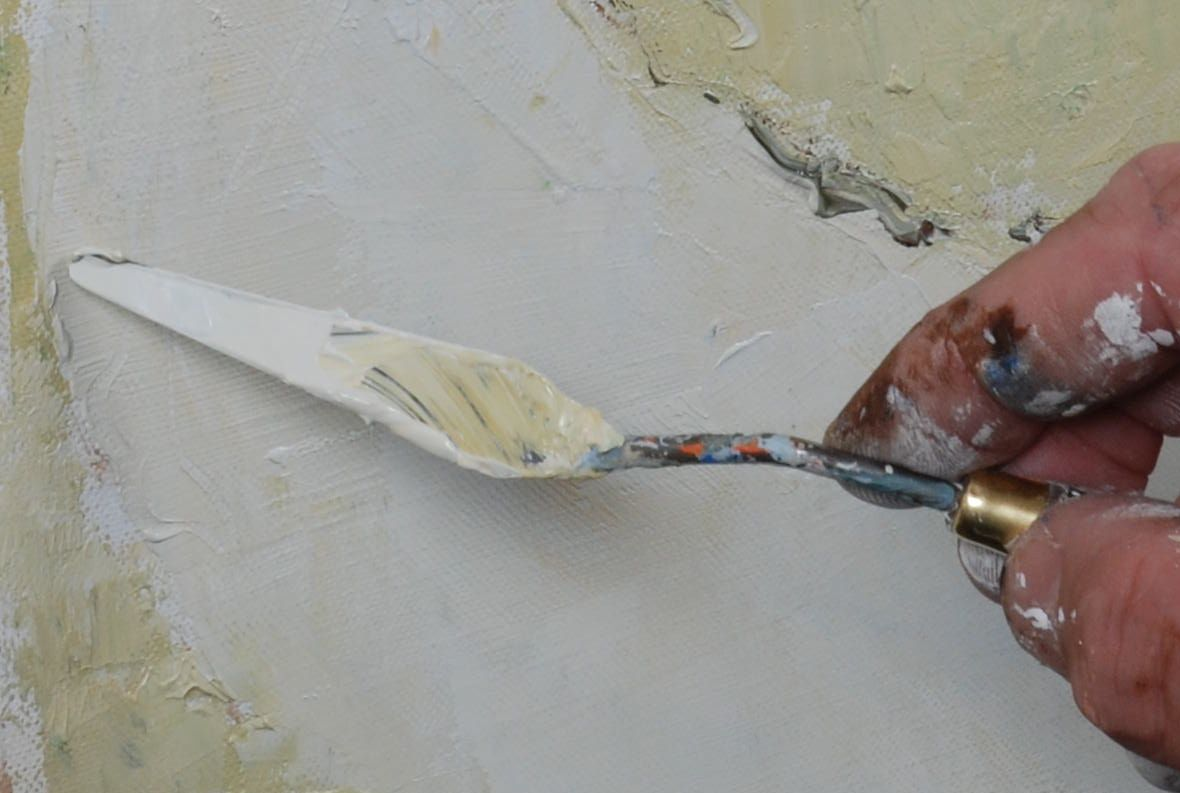
- Court: Court of Appeal
- Full case name: Samuel Oswald Pascoe v Pearl Turner
- Decided: 1 December 1978
- Citations: [1978] EWCA Civ 2 [1979] 2 All ER 945 [1979] WLR 431 [1979] 1 WLR 431
- Transcript

Case history
- Prior actions: Appellant, by contrast, lost before Mr. I.S. McKintosh sitting as Deputy Circuit Judge at Camborne and Redruth County Court
- Subsequent action: none

Case opinions
- Held: the court should consider all the circumstances...the court must decide what is the minimum equity to do justice to her having regard to the way in which she changed her position for the worse by reason of the acquiescence and encouragement of the legal owner. Held: Compared to her, on the evidence the plaintiff is a rich man. He might not regard an expenditure of a few hundred pounds as a very grave loss. But the court has to regard her change of position over the years 1973 to 1976. We take the view that the equity cannot here be satisfied without granting a remedy which assures to the respondent security of tenure, quiet enjoyment, and freedom of action in respect of repairs and improvements without interference from the appellant.
- Decision by: Cumming-Bruce LJ
- Concurrence: Orr LJ; Lawton LJ

Keywords
- Proprietary estoppel; reliance; detriment

Pascoe v Turner [1979] 1 WLR 431 is an English land law case, a case of proprietary estoppel.

== Facts ==
The husband, was a fairly successful man of commerce and at all material times was and had been building up some capital assets which he invested in purchases of private and commercial property. After 10 years living in a house registered in his name with his wife, he left for a mistress. Soon he offered marriage, which she declined. They found a house in 1965 which he bought and he thereafter clearly assured her it would be hers. On the back of this she redecorated, buying carpets and curtains, improved and repaired, but there was never any written agreement or conveyance. Work she carried out and/or paid for:

1. Partly replumbing house, providing hot water from immersion system to kitchen and installing new sink unit and other fitments. Installing gas into the kitchen.
2. Joining outside toilet to rear door of premises by a blockwork-covered way.
3. Installing gas conduits and installing a gas fire into the lounge.
4. Repairing and retiling the roof where necessary and repairing lead valleys.
5. Repairing and redecorating interior. So she stayed on. He lived nearby and sometimes visited her. She continued to collect some rents for him.

Then there was a quarrel. He decided to throw her out of the house if he could. In April 1976 his solicitors wrote to her giving her two months notice "to determine her licence to occupy", and demanded possession in June 1976. She refused to go.

In this action he sued her for possession of what he regarded as his legal home; she counterclaimed for an order to give effect that he held the house on trust for her (and her heirs and assigns absolutely) and that the contents of the house belonged to her.

== Judgment ==
The Court of Appeal held the mistress occupied the house under a bare licence, and had received an imperfect gift of the house. No trust could be inferred, but the encouragement to improve the house in the belief it was hers created a proprietary estoppel. A mere licence can be defeated by a sale of the house, so to comply with equity the legal owner, her ex-cohabitee was ordered to execute a conveyance.

== Cases applied ==
- Dillwyn v Llewelyn (1862) 4 De GF&J 517
- Inwards v Baker [1965] 2 QB 29
- Crabb v Arun DC [1976] Ch 179 applied.

== See also ==
- English land law
- English trusts law
- English property law
