= Liverpool Victoria =

Company

- Trade name: LV=
- Type: Mutual organisation
- Industry: Financial services
- Founded: 1843
- Headquarters: Westbourne area of Bournemouth, United Kingdom
- Products: Insurance, savings, equity release
- Website: www.lv.com

Liverpool Victoria, trading since May 2007 as LV=, is one of the United Kingdom's largest insurance companies. It offers a range of protection, savings and retirement products as well as financial advice.

== History ==
=== History ===
The first known meeting of the Liverpool Victoria Friendly Society was in March 1843 but there is no record of the members of the committee or its incorporation or rules. The anniversary history described it as starting without any subscribed capital, or influence and little experience. All that is known is that its president was a William Fenton, who also became treasurer and is believed to be the driving force behind the Society's early growth. However, its objectives were clearly set out in its first report in September 1843. “The great object of this Society is to afford the poorer classes of the community the means of providing for themselves and their children a decent interment at the trilling expense of a halfpenny, a penny or three pence, according to the age of the member” For the remainder of the nineteenth century the Society was associated with what simple life assurance or the ‘penny policy’. Door-to-door agents collected these penny premiums, allowing people to provide for the costs of a decent funeral. After eighteen months the Society had provided for over 200 funerals.

Within the space of three or four years, the Society had collectors operating outside Liverpool, in towns such as Chester and Runcorn. By the 1860s, Liverpool Victoria was operating across England from Newcastle to Plymouth with collectors also in Scotland, Wales and Ireland. An increasing amount of business was being transacted in London and in 1884 the Chief Office was moved there – an early example of a commercial head office moving out of Liverpool. A wider range of product was being offered to customers and in 1906, to recognise this, the Society proposed to convert to a limited liability company. This was fiercely contested through the courts and it was not until 1907 that arbitrators ruled that a subsidiary could be formed “for the transaction of business outside the Society’s scope”.

The development of new business lines was a continuing feature of the Society's expansion. A particularly important introduction followed the National Insurance Act 1911 that created a contributions-based system of health insurance. Friendly societies which had their own schemes were given a major role in administering health insurance and in 1912 the Liverpool Victoria established its own approved National Insurance Society. Another example was that by the 1930s, the Society was offering complete home insurance policies through its link with the Commercial Insurance Company.

In May 2013, LV= issued subordinated bonds priced at £350 million. This debt, which carries interest at 6.5%, is due for repayment in 2043, although LV= has the option to repay it from 2023. The debt counts as lower tier 2 capital and is expected to be eligible as capital under the Solvency 2 capital regime which will apply to all EU insurance companies from 1 January 2016.

Liverpool Victoria Friendly Society Limited was deregistered as a friendly society and registered as Liverpool Victoria Financial Services Ltd. on 2 January 2020 with the company focusing on life insurance, pensions and investments. It remains a mutual organisation owned by its members. Liverpool Victoria General Insurance was sold to Allianz in 2019 and is no longer part of Liverpool Victoria though the name continues to be used under a brand licence agreement.

=== Recent developments ===
Liverpool Victoria Friendly Society Limited was deregistered as a friendly society and registered as Liverpool Victoria Financial Services Ltd. on 2 January 2020 with the company focusing on life insurance, pensions and investments.

After members rejected the sale to Bain Capital in December 2021, LV= (as it is now known) removed chief executive, Mark Hartigan and the mutual came under new leadership. Former Bupa chief executive, David Hynam, joined as Chief Executive in September 2022. Hynam was noted for his values-driven leadership style and a background in business transformation.

After the abandoned Bain take over, the company reported a loss before tax and member bonuses of £265 million in its 2022 Annual Report and Accounts. In response, a series of strategic changes were introduced.

Alongside these developments, the business received recognition for leadership and corporate culture. LV= won Best Employee Experience – Large Company at the UK Customer Experience Awards in 2024 and were finalists in the Organisational Award for Supporting Diversity category of the Women in Pensions Awards in the same year. David Hynam was named the global top LGBTQ+ executive by INvolve in 2024 and in the Attitude 101 2025 list of influential figures.

== Acquisitions ==
Although most of the growth in the society was organic, there were almost twenty transfers of business from other societies.

- Liverpool Crown & Anchor Friendly Society (1885)
- Liverpool Protective Assurance & Burial Society (1903)
- New Era (1904)
- General Friendly Collecting Society (formerly Leeds and General Friendly Society) (includes the Hulme Burial Society) (1908)
- Most Friendly Burial Collecting Society (1933)
- City Mutual (Guernsey) Collecting Society (1935)
- City Mutual (Jersey) Collecting Society (1935)
- Hibernian Mutual Assurance Collecting Society (1944)
- General Federation of Trade Unions Friendly & Collecting Society (GFTU) (1952)
- Independent Burial Society (1953)
- Withington Friendly Burial Collecting Society (1954)
- Ardwick Union Burial Society (1957)
- Keighley Samaritan Brief (1963)
- Druids Burial Society (1965)
- Permanent Insurance Company Limited (2001)
- Royal National Pension Fund for Nurses (RNPFN, 2001)
- UIA Insurance Limited (life business only) (2005)
- Tomorrow (2007)
- Teachers Provident Society (2016)

== Business activities ==
LV= offers services directly to consumers, as well as through IFAs and insurance brokers, and through strategic partnerships with organisations such as ASDA, Nationwide Building Society and some trades unions.

At the start of 2015 LV= was ranked in a survey called the UK Institute of Customer Service Satisfaction Index (UKCSI) as the best insurance business in the UK for customer satisfaction and seventh best across all UK businesses, with only one other insurer in the Top 50.

=== General insurance ===
General insurance products covering motor, home, pet, travel and small business insurance are provided by Liverpool Victoria Insurance Company Limited. Some products are sold both directly to the public over the telephone and internet and, under the ABC Insurance and Highway brands, through insurance brokers. This latter distribution channel (known collectively as LV= Broker) was boosted in October 2008 by the £150 million acquisition of Highway Insurance Group PLC, following a successful public offering for its shares. Since 2007 the general insurance division has also owned Britannia Rescue, the UK's fourth largest road rescue business, which in 2009 won a contract to be the exclusive provider of road rescue services to the customers of Asda. General insurance products are also sold through white label partnership arrangements including Nationwide Building Society, and CSMA Club, the latter arrangement dating back to 1923.

The general insurance business of LV= has its origins in the acquisition in 1996 of Frizzell, a business founded in 1923, which acted as a broker of motor and household insurance policies. A new subsidiary company, Liverpool Victoria Insurance Company Limited, was established in 1996 in order to underwrite the Frizzell business, which was augmented in 1997 by the acquisition of the motor and household policies of Landmark Insurance. In 2006 it acquired ABC Insurance, a start-up insurance company established by John O'Roarke, formerly the managing director of Churchill Insurance and a senior executive of Direct Line, together with other former Direct Line executives, with a view to delivering substantial growth and an increase in public profile to a business that was then in steady decline, reliant on direct mail for marketing and with unsophisticated underwriting. This was achieved. By the end of 2012 the £386 million of premium income and 1.1 million customers of 2006 had increased to £1.5 billion of premium income and over 4 million customers with profits of £117 million. The business had become the UK's third-biggest motor insurer with an 11% market share. The transformation of the business was acknowledged by receiving the accolade of General Insurer of the Year at the 2012 British Insurance awards.

In 2017, LV= concluded a deal with Allianz to sell its general insurance division for a deal worth up to £1bn. This would mean the commercial lines of the insurer would go to Allianz, with the latter's personal lines going in the opposite direction, and creating a joint venture between the firms.

In 2019, Allianz purchased the remaining 51% of the general insurance division in a simultaneous purchase of Legal & General's general insurance division for £800m which concluded with both of the respective firms becoming part of Allianz on 1 January 2020 with the general insurance division of L&G being renamed officially as Fairmead Insurance but keeping the L&G branding.

=== Life assurance ===
Life assurance products covering with-profits assurance, term assurance, whole life insurance, annuities and equity release mortgages are provided by Liverpool Victoria Friendly Society Limited and Liverpool Victoria Life Company Limited. Since January 2008 the product range has been augmented by flexible retirement pensions and equity release schemes through the acquisition from Swiss Re of the former G E Life businesses in the United Kingdom.

In 1999 Liverpool Victoria was heavily criticised in a report by the Personal Investment Authority for "serious and widespread compliance failings" including hiring inept staff who offered customers poor financial advice. The society was fined £900,000, the largest fine ever handed out by the PIA at the time.

Liverpool Victoria Life Company Limited, then known as Permanent Insurance, was purchased from Equitable Life for £150 million in 2001.

It was announced in December 2014 that Liverpool Victoria would be acquiring the business of Teachers Assurance, subject to the approval of the latter's members.

Liverpool Victoria confirmed that its mulling all its options including the sale of its life and pensions business with Fenchurch Advisory Partners advising on its options and in October 2020 entered exclusive negotiations with Bain Capital. In December 2021, members of Liverpool Victoria rejected selling the company to Bain Capital for a reported £530m.

=== Investments ===
In August 2011 it was announced that the fund management services and OEICS provided by Liverpool Victoria Asset Management Limited and Liverpool Victoria Portfolio Managers Limited would be transferred to Threadneedle Asset Management as LV= had failed to achieve sufficient scale, despite having some £8 billion of funds under management.

=== Banking ===
Liverpool Victoria Banking Services Limited, which came into the LV= group as part of the 1996 Frizzell acquisition, provided loans and credit cards until 2007 when the business was closed following heavy losses. In 2008 the company was fined £840,000 by the FSA in connection with its past sale of payment protection insurance alongside loans.

== Offices ==
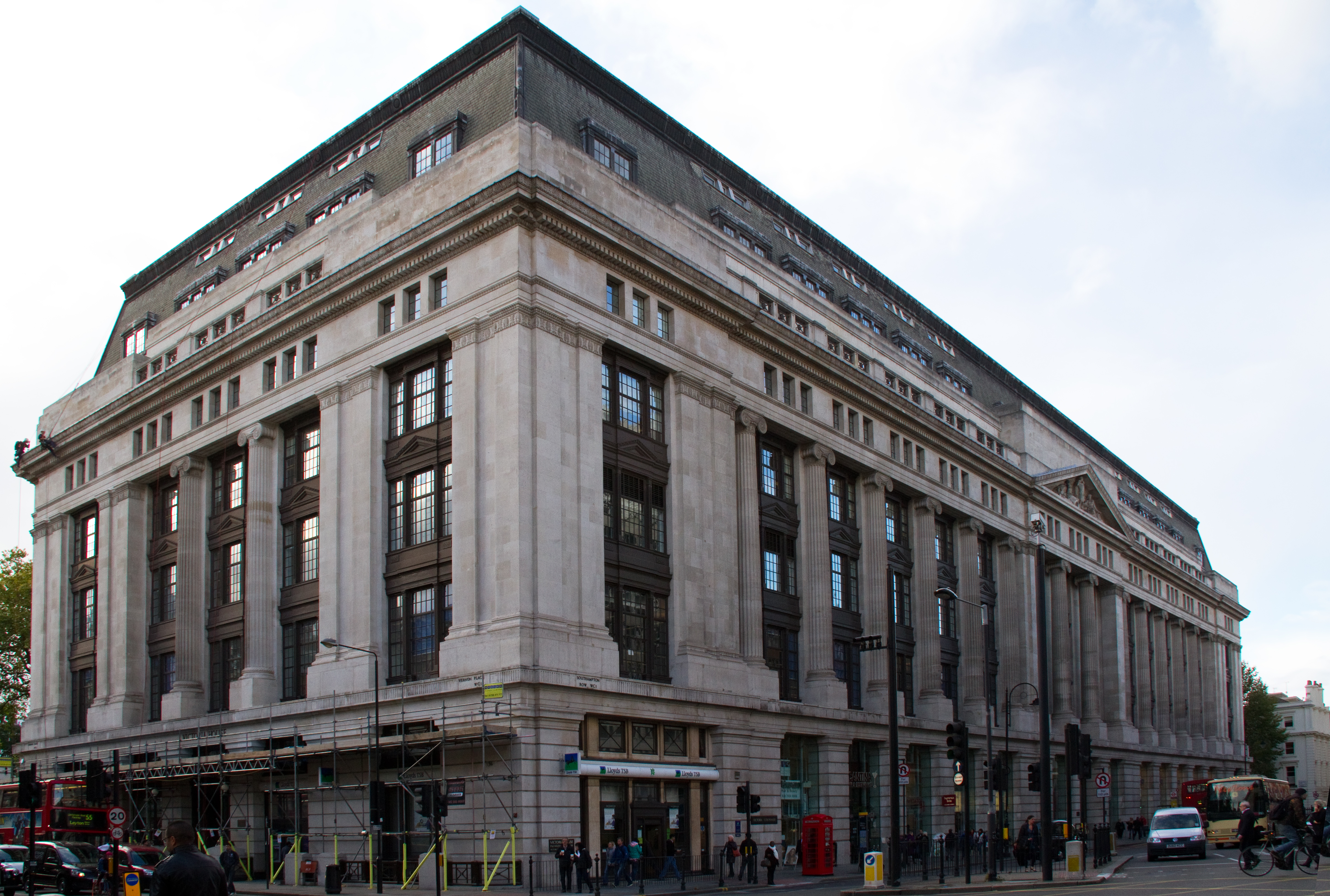
Victoria House from Southampton Row

Victoria House in Bloomsbury Square, London, was built for Liverpool Victoria in the 1920s and remained its head office until the company relocated to Bournemouth in 1996.

== Brand and image ==
Following the appointment of Mike Rogers as the new Chief Executive in 2006, LV= has undergone significant change in an effort to modernise its image and to re-invent itself in the face of the gradual industry-wide decline in with-profits assurance. On 25 July 2016 Richard Rowney replaced Mike Rogers as CEO.

=== LV= and LV.com ===
In early 2007 the name Liverpool Victoria was dropped (although it remains the formal name of most legal entities within the group) in favour of LV=. A distinctive green heart icon stylized from the letter 'V' has also become a symbol of the group in its advertising, playing on the visual similarity of LV= to the word love. Shortly after the rebranding, LV= acquired the Internet domain name LV.com, which the French luxury goods manufacturer Louis Vuitton had, in November 2006, failed to acquire from Manifest Information Services (aka Manifest Hostmaster and Manifest.com) through a WIPO lawsuit.

=== Sponsorship ===
In recent years the society has promoted itself through sponsorship of sport. As Liverpool Victoria, it sponsored the UK Snooker Championship from 1997 to 2000. It has sponsored the cricket County Championship since 2002, initially (2002–2005) as Frizzell (the name of an old established insurance business acquired in 1996), in 2006 as Liverpool Victoria and since 2007 as LV=. In rugby union, LV= signed a three-year sponsorship deal with Premiership club Harlequins in October 2008, and in October 2009 signed a two-year deal to become title sponsor of the Anglo-Welsh Cup. The 2023 Ashes series is sponsored by LV=.

=== Television ===
In 2007, for the first time in the society's history, television advertising was employed for car insurance and life assurance, the former featuring the song "Have Love, Will Travel", and the latter featuring Cilla Black.

== See also ==
- Taylor Fashions v Liverpool Victoria Trustees (1979), a leading case on proprietary estoppel
