= Cobbe v Yeoman's Row Management Ltd =

English land law case

Cobbe v Yeoman’s Row Management Ltd
- Court: House of Lords
- Full case name: Yeoman's Row Management Limited v Cobbe
- Decided: 30 July 2008
- Citations: [2008] UKHL 55 [2008] 1 WLR 1752 [2008] 4 All ER 713 [2009] 1 All ER (Comm) 205

Case history
- Prior actions: The appellant Yeoman's Row in reported cases lost at first instance and at first appeal

Court membership
- Judges sitting: Lord Hoffmann; Lord Scott; Lord Walker; Lord Brown; Lord Mance

Keywords
- Unjust enrichment (quantum meruit); Planning and architectural services Proprietary estoppel (not found); Constructive trust (not found)

Cobbe v Yeoman's Row Management Ltd [2008] UKHL 55 is a House of Lords case in English land law and relates to proprietary estoppel in the multi-property developer context. The court of final appeal awarded the project manager £150,000 on a quantum meruit basis for unjust enrichment because Yeoman's Row had received the benefit of his services without paying for that. The court refused to find or acknowledge a binding contract, prior arrangement with a third party or promise (such as would be necessary for proprietary estoppel or for a constructive trust), overturning a £2m award on the basis of a possible lien arising from a promise over the property. The court found a non-binding agreement in principle, entirely subject to the owner's final say to take into account for example their view of the market; this was the basis on the facts on which the parties were proceeding.

Lord of Appeal in Ordinary, Lord Walker, with whom the other four Lords agreed adjudged that Cobbe "ran a commercial risk with his eyes open. This was commerce."

== Facts ==
Mr Cobbe, a project manager/developer, claimed that the landowner Yeoman's Row Ltd had sat by and encouraged him to go to great expense in obtaining planning permission for a development, and should not be able to resile from an agreement in principle for the development site's sale. Yeoman's Row Ltd owned Knightsbridge land with 13 flats at 38-62 Yeoman's Row, London, SW3 2AH. They wanted to knock them down and build six terraced houses. One of the directors orally agreed with Mr Cobbe he would

1. at his own expense apply for planning to demolish the existing flats and put up the six-house terrace
2. after planning permission, and getting vacant possession the company would sell him the freehold for £12m
3. Mr Cobbe would develop the property as per the permission
4. the six houses would be sold and half the proceeds in excess of £24m would be given over.

Both knew nothing was, as yet, binding. Cobbe, regardless, spent a lot of time and effort between 2002 and 2004 applying for planning. By late 2003 the company had decided to pull out, and to ask for more money up front, but still deliberately gave Cobbe the impression that they would continue. Mr Cobbe got planning in March 2004, and the value was rising so fast it had increased by another £4m without work having even begun. Mrs Lisle-Mainwaring then said she wanted £20m, to be paid up front. He claimed breach of contract. The company claimed this was doomed to fail, because of LPMPA 1989 s 2. He claimed alternatively proprietary estoppel, constructive trust and/or unjust enrichment.

Etherton J found on proprietary estoppel in Mr Cobbe's favour, and awarded £2m, equal to half of the increase in value of Yeoman Row's freehold caused by the grant in the planning permission. The Court of Appeal: Mummery, Dyson LJJ and Sir Martin Nourse, upheld that decision.

== Judgment ==
The House of Lords held Mr Cobbe had no proprietary estoppel claim, nor had he acquired an interest under a constructive trust. However he did have a claim for unjust enrichment, because Yeoman's Row had received the benefit of his services without paying for him. He was awarded £150,000, which reflected the application expenses, and a reasonable fee for professional services.

Lord Hoffmann agreed with Lord Scott.

Lord Scott gave the following judgment.

;Proprietary estoppel

14. Both the learned judge and the Court of Appeal regarded the relief granted as justified on the basis of proprietary estoppel. I respectfully disagree. The remedy to which, on the facts as found by the judge, Mr Cobbe is entitled can, in my opinion, be described neither as based on an estoppel nor as proprietary in character. There are several important authorities to which I want to refer but I want first to consider as a matter of principle the nature of a proprietary estoppel. An "estoppel" bars the object of it from asserting some fact or facts, or, sometimes, something that is a mixture of fact and law, that stands in the way of some right claimed by the person entitled to the benefit of the estoppel. The estoppel becomes a "proprietary" estoppel - a sub-species of a "promissory" estoppel - if the right claimed is a proprietary right, usually a right to or over land but, in principle, equally available in relation to chattels or choses in action. So, what is the fact or facts, or the matter of mixed fact and law, that, in the present case, the appellant is said to be barred from asserting? And what is the proprietary right claimed by Mr Cobbe that the facts and matters the appellant is barred from asserting might otherwise defeat?

15. The pleadings do not answer these questions. The terms of the oral "agreement in principle", the second agreement, relied on by Mr Cobbe are pleaded but it is accepted that there remained still for negotiation other terms. The second agreement was, contractually, an incomplete agreement. The terms that had already been agreed were regarded by the parties as being "binding in honour", but it follows that the parties knew they were not legally binding. So what is it that the appellant is estopped from asserting or from denying? The appellant cannot be said to be estopped from asserting that the second agreement was unenforceable for want of writing, for Mr Cobbe does not claim that it was enforceable; nor from denying that the second agreement covered all the terms that needed to be agreed between the parties, for Mr Cobbe does not claim that it did; nor from denying that, pre 18 March 2004, Mr Cobbe had acquired any proprietary interest in the property, for he has never alleged that he had. And what proprietary claim was Mr Cobbe making that an estoppel was necessary to protect? His originally pleaded claim to specific performance of the second agreement was abandoned at a very early stage in the trial (see para.8 above) and the proprietary claims that remained were claims that the appellant held the property on trust for itself and Mr Cobbe. These remaining proprietary claims were presumably based on the proposition that a constructive trust of the property, with appropriate beneficial interests for the appellant and Mr Cobbe, should, by reason of the unconscionable conduct of Mrs Lisle-Mainwaring, be imposed on the property. I must examine that proposition when dealing with constructive trust as a possible means of providing Mr Cobbe with a remedy, but the proposition is not one that requires or depends upon any estoppel.

16. It is relevant to notice that the amendments to Mr Cobbe's pleaded prayer for relief, made when the specific performance and damages for breach of contract claims were abandoned, include the following : "(4) Alternatively, a declaration that [the appellant and Mrs Lisle-Mainwaring] are estopped from denying that [Mr Cobbe] has such interest in the Property and/or the proceeds of sale thereof as the Court thinks fit." This is the only pleaded formulation of the estoppel relied on by Mr Cobbe and, with respect to the pleader, is both meaningless and pointless. Etherton J concluded, in para.85 of his judgment, that the facts of the case "gave rise to a proprietary estoppel in favour of Mr Cobbe", but nowhere identified the content of the estoppel. Mummery LJ agreed (paras.60 and 61 of his judgment, concurred in by Dyson LJ (para.120) and Sir Martin Nourse (para.141)), but he, too, did not address the content of the estoppel. Both Etherton J and Mummery LJ regarded the proprietary estoppel conclusion as justified by the unconscionability of Mrs Lisle-Mainwaring's conduct. My Lords, unconscionability of conduct may well lead to a remedy but, in my opinion, proprietary estoppel cannot be the route to it unless the ingredients for a proprietary estoppel are present. These ingredients should include, in principle, a proprietary claim made by a claimant and an answer to that claim based on some fact, or some point of mixed fact and law, that the person against whom the claim is made can be estopped from asserting. To treat a "proprietary estoppel equity" as requiring neither a proprietary claim by the claimant nor an estoppel against the defendant but simply unconscionable behaviour is, in my respectful opinion, a recipe for confusion.

[...]

27. My Lords, I can easily accept that a subject-to-contract reservation made in the course of negotiations for a contract relating to the acquisition of an interest in land could be withdrawn, whether expressly or by inference from conduct. But debate about subject-to-contract reservations has only a peripheral relevance in the present case, for such a reservation is pointless in the context of oral negotiations relating to the acquisition of an interest in land. It would be an unusually unsophisticated negotiator who was not well aware that oral agreements relating to such an acquisition are by statute unenforceable and that no express reservation to make them so is needed. Mr Cobbe was an experienced property developer and Mrs Lisle-Mainwaring gives every impression of knowing her way around the negotiating table. Mr Cobbe did not spend his money and time on the planning application in the mistaken belief that the agreement was legally enforceable. He spent his money and time well aware that it was not. Mrs Lisle-Mainwaring did not encourage in him a belief that the second agreement was enforceable. She encouraged in him a belief that she would abide by it although it was not. Mr Cobbe's belief, or expectation, was always speculative. He knew she was not legally bound. He regarded her as bound "in honour" but that is an acknowledgement that she was not legally bound.

28. The reality of this case, in my opinion, is that Etherton J and the Court of Appeal regarded their finding that Mrs Lisle-Mainwaring's behaviour in repudiating, and seeking an improvement on, the core financial terms of the second agreement was unconscionable, an evaluation from which I do not in the least dissent, as sufficient to justify the creation of a "proprietary estoppel equity". As Mummery LJ said (para.123), she took unconscionable advantage of Mr Cobbe. The advantage taken was the benefit of his services, his time and his money, in obtaining planning permission for the property. The advantage was unconscionable because immediately following the grant of planning permission, she repudiated the financial terms on which Mr Cobbe had been expecting to be able to purchase the property. But to leap from there to a conclusion that a proprietary estoppel case was made out was not, in my opinion, justified. Let it be supposed that Mrs Lisle-Mainwaring were to be held estopped from denying that the core financial terms of the second agreement were the financial terms on which Mr Cobbe was entitled to purchase the property. How would that help Mr Cobbe? He still would not have a complete agreement. Suppose Mrs Lisle-Mainwaring had simply said she had changed her mind and did not want the property to be sold after all. What would she be estopped from denying? Proprietary estoppel requires, in my opinion, clarity as to what it is that the object of the estoppel is to be estopped from denying, or asserting, and clarity as to the interest in the property in question that that denial, or assertion, would otherwise defeat. If these requirements are not recognised, proprietary estoppel will lose contact with its roots and risk becoming unprincipled and therefore unpredictable, if it has not already become so. This is not, in my opinion, a case in which a remedy can be granted to Mr Cobbe on the basis of proprietary estoppel.

Lord Walker noted that in Gillett, the young farm manager did not take any legal advice and believed the assurances to be binding, whereas in the commercial context, a business person will have access to advice, and the focus is not on intangible legal rights, but on tangible property one expects to get. A domestic claimant does not reflect on potential litigation. He asked, ‘would it be conscionable for Mrs Lisle-Mainwaring to withdraw (subject only to reimbursement) at a stage when 99% of the work necessary to obtain planning permission had been done, and success was virtually certain, but unconscionable to do so once success had actually been achieved?’ This shows the risk Mr Cobbe took on. But he ran a commercial risk with his eyes open. This was commerce.

79. Crabb v Arun District Council, the facts of which are well known, is a difficult case, not least because of different views taken by different members of the Court (Lord Denning MR, and Lawton and Scarman LJJ). The situation was that of a commercial negotiation in which both sides expected formal legal documents to be agreed and executed. The case is best explained, I think, by recognising that the Council's erection of the two sets of gates was an act so unequivocal that it led to Mr Crabb irretrievably altering his position, putting the matter beyond the stage at which it was open to negotiation: see at pp 186 (Lord Denning MR), 191 (Lawton LJ) and 197 (Scarman LJ).

80. In Pridean the Court of Appeal upheld the County Court judge's rejection of the estoppel claim on the grounds that the negotiations still left one crucial point still to be decided. In the present case, by contrast, the judge found (in para 68 of his judgment, quoted above) that all the critical commercial terms had been agreed in principle. Mr Dowding did not directly challenge that conclusion, but he pointed out that the successful redevelopment involved many uncertainties which were not simply a matter for Mr Cobbe and Mrs Lisle-Mainwaring to agree between themselves; I will come back to that aspect of the matter.

81. In my opinion none of these cases casts any doubt on the general principle laid down by this House in Ramsden v Dyson, that conscious reliance on honour alone will not give rise to an estoppel. Nor do they cast doubt on the general principle that the court should be very slow to introduce uncertainty into commercial transactions by over-ready use of equitable concepts such as fiduciary obligations and equitable estoppel. That applies to commercial negotiations whether or not they are expressly stated to be subject to contract.

[...]

87. The informal bargain made in this case was unusually complex, as both courts below acknowledged. When a claim based on equitable estoppel is made in a domestic setting the informal bargain or understanding is typically on the following lines: if you live here as my carer/companion/lover you will have a home for life. The expectation is of acquiring and keeping an interest in an identified property. In this case, by contrast, Mr Cobbe was expecting to get a contract. Under that contract he (or much more probably a company controlled by him) would have been entitled to acquire the property for a down-payment of £12m, but only as part of a deal under which the block of flats on the site was to be demolished, the site cleared, and six very expensive townhouses were to be erected instead, and sold for the best prices that they would fetch. The interests of Mrs Lisle-Mainwaring and YRML were not restricted to the £12m down-payment. She was to receive a further sum amounting (together with the £12m) to one-half of the gross proceeds of sale of the six townhouses. She would expect this future sum to be secured on the property. The bank or other institution providing the development finance would also expect its lending to be fully secured. At some point a very large sum of money was going to be secured on an empty site. None of these matters seems to have been under negotiation before the deal collapsed in March 2004. Mr Ivory made a virtue of that point, arguing that the absence of any active negotiations between September 2002 and March 2004 shows that the parties did not expect to encounter any difficulty in agreeing these matters. It is more likely, to my mind, that they both accepted that there was no point in tackling them until planning permission had been obtained.

[...]

91. When examined in that way, Mr Cobbe's case seems to me to fail on the simple but fundamental point that, as persons experienced in the property world, both parties knew that there was no legally binding contract, and that either was therefore free to discontinue the negotiations without legal liability—that is liability in equity as well as at law, to echo the words of Lord Cranworth quoted in para 53 above. Mr Cobbe was therefore running a risk, but he stood to make a handsome profit if the deal went ahead, and the market stayed favourable. He may have thought that any attempt to get Mrs Lisle-Mainwaring to enter into a written contract before the grant of planning permission would be counter-productive. Whatever his reasons for doing so, the fact is that he ran a commercial risk, with his eyes open, and the outcome has proved unfortunate for him. It is true that he did not expressly state, at the time, that he was relying solely on Mrs Lisle-Mainwaring's sense of honour, but to draw that sort of distinction in a commercial context would be as unrealistic, in my opinion, as to draw a firm distinction depending on whether the formula "subject to contract" had or had not actually been used.

Lord Brown and Lord Mance concurred.

== Considered in ==
- Dowding v Matchmove Ltd [2016] CA
- Benedetti v Sawiris [2013] SC (E) (England and Wales)

== Distinguished in ==
- Thorner v Major [2009] HL (E) (England and Wales)

== See also ==
- English contract law
- English land law
