= Teachers Assurance =

UK company

Teachers Assurance (officially Teachers Provident Society Limited and previously known as the Teachers Group and simply Teachers) is a friendly society in the United Kingdom. The company offers a range of savings, investment home insurance, health and life cover for individuals and their families, designed with teachers in mind.

Teachers Assurance is a mutual friendly society, which means it has no shareholders. The company is owned by, and works for, its members (the people who save and invest in their products). Any profits are shared between members or reinvested to provide services to the teaching profession.

It was announced in December 2014 that the business of Teachers would, subject to regulatory and member approval, be transferred to Liverpool Victoria Friendly Society.

Following the vote in favour of transfer to LV= (Liverpool Victoria Friendly Society) by Teachers Assurance members at the Special General Meeting in December 2015 and the agreement of the regulators, Teachers Assurance business was transferred to LV= on 1 June 2016.

== History ==
Teachers Assurance was initiated in 1877 by the NUT (National Union of Teachers). Although they are now separate companies, the two still work in partnership and Teachers Assurance is endorsed by the NUT to provide financial services to members.
