= Gillett v Holt =

Land Law Case

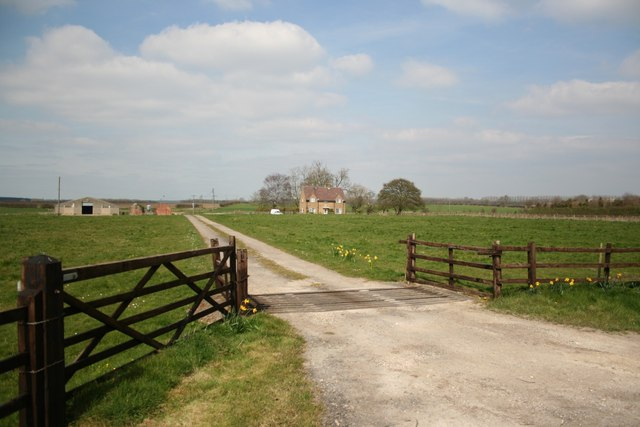
- The case concerned a portfolio of lands and businesses in Baumber, Lincolnshire
- Court: Court of Appeal
- Full case name: Geoffrey Gillett v Kenneth A Holt and Others
- Citations: [2001] Ch 210 [2000] 3 WLR 815 [2000] 2 All ER 289 [2000] 2 FLR 266, CA
- Transcript

Case history
- Prior actions: Appellant failed at the High Court before Mr Justice Carnwath: [1998] 3 All ER 917 [1998] 2 FLR 470

Court membership
- Judges sitting: Beldam LJ; Robert Walker LJ; Waller LJ

Case opinions
- Decision by: Robert Walker LJ
- Concurrence: Beldam LJ; Waller LJ

Keywords
- Proprietary estoppel; quantum meruit (unjust enrichment); change of beneficiaries;

Gillett v Holt [2000] is an English land law case concerning proprietary estoppel and a farming businesses' dispute. The case focused on a farmer of a portfolio of farming businesses without any obvious heirs who made many promises and assurances of inheritance to two partial farm managers who were neighbours or tenants of his, one of whom had farmed for 38 years, the other co-farmed for the last 5 years of those 38 years.

== Facts ==
In 1956, at age 12, Geoffrey Gillett met Mr. Holt, a 38-year-old farmer at Woodhall Spa golf club who kept employed a foreman, a small number of labourers and a housekeeper. He became his caddie and friend. In 1956, he began working on Holt's farm continuing this work over 38 years. In 1971 Holt (or his company) helped in various acquisitions leading to the relevant assets below. Holt had made seven separate representations to Gillett, from 1964 to 1989, as to his eventual inheritance of the farm - such as "all this will be yours" after Gillett brought in his first harvest in 1964 and at the christening of his first child in 1971, and "it was all going to be yours anyway" in 1975. Gillett's wife's brother attested to a conversation at his parents' house, at which Mr Holt said "something to the effect that he was going to look after Geoffrey and [my sister, his wife] Sally and that they would have an assured future". Holt had confirmed this in his Will of the time, sought adoption of Gillett when young, later seeking to add him instead to the Merton College agricultural tenancy; he soon gave too a 20% share of his main farming company as it first stood to Gillett and his wife.

In 1995, Holt tried to sack Gillett and remove he and his wife from The Beeches and to remove him as his death beneficiary in favour of another neighbouring farmer, Wood, who had begun to manage part of the land. Holt first met him in 1992. Gillett claimed proprietary estoppel to remain in possession of the land he had worked, and be given land/compensation at the main farm. In 1997 Holt or his companies had enough money to buy the main farmland outright from Merton College, Oxford (for £1,251,000) and did so.

=== Assets and relationship of claimant to assets ===
The Limes farmhouse (with about 19 acres and two cottages in Baumber)

Holt transferred this to Wood as legal and beneficial owner with vacant possession. A minor complication (but an important one from the Gilletts' point of view) is that on part of the 19 acres remained polytunnels (prefabricated polythene greenhouses) in which Gillett started off trees and shrubs for his business Countryside Companions. Another court hearing decided Countryside Companions did not have an agricultural tenancy of these structures and the land it occupied.

White House Farm (235 acres)

Wood has been legal and beneficial owner since 1996. Its land, in hand, was farmed under a contract by Aubourn Farming Ltd (Aubourn).

The Limes farmland (520 acres)

KAHL was legal freeholder and beneficial owner. KAHL owed £1m to Edgescan Ltd (Edgescan), its controlling shareholder, unsecured. The land was in hand and farmed by Aubourn.

The Beeches (105 acres)

"This land has the most complicated pattern of ownership and occupation. The freehold belong[ed] to KAHL, as it has since 1971, subject to a bank mortgage. The farmhouse is occupied by Mr and Mrs Gillett under a tenancy to Mr Gillett which has limited protection under the Rent (Agriculture) Act 1976. The rent is £70 a week. The central area of the land and a small area at the east end (in all about 39 acres) are [used by Gillett's business] Countryside Companions under a tenancy protected by the Agricultural Holdings Act 1986. The rest of the land is in hand and farmed by Aubourn; this year's crop is wheat."

KAHL

A company part held (80 per cent) by Edgescan Ltd; part held (10 per cent) by Mr Gillett; part held (10 per cent) by Mrs Gillett. It had an unsecured debt of £1m to Edgescan Ltd and a further liability (secured on The Beeches) of an unknown amount to the bank. The court was not told about any other assets which it owns, or of the precise terms of its contract farming arrangement with Aubourn.

Edgescan Ltd

A new company of the 1990s, owned 70% by Holt, 30% by Wood.

The hearings judge in the High Court found against Gillett, applying the persuasive non-binding High Court decision, Dickens v Taylor [1998] 1 FLR 806, 821, holding that a promise to leave property in a Will could not give rise to a proprietary estoppel because wills are inherently revocable. He found the other promises and thwarted succession plans by third parties (i.e. Merton College's policy as to farmers, remaining active, transferring their tenancies and Gillett's father's refusal of Holt's proposed adoption of Gillett as a teenager) not strong enough; and he viewed as inadequate the detriment Gillett suffered during the time of the promise until its alleged breach.

== Judgment ==
The decision was reversed by the Court of Appeal, rejecting the 'irrevocable promise' approach and in these circumstances held the court will impose a more liberal view of the requirement of detriment.

Robert Walker LJ held that Mr Gillett was entitled to a share of the property and could not simply be ejected:

"The fundamental principle that equity is concerned to prevent unconscionable conduct permeates all the elements of the doctrine. In the end the court must look at the matter in the round… "

The assurances of 1975 "were intended to be relied on, and were in fact relied on."

In persuasive, non-binding sources of law he noted esteemed legal academic criticism of Dickens v Taylor. Professor Swadling commented that decision is ‘clearly wrong’ because the whole point is they are promised ‘unsupported by consideration, are initially revocable’ but they are made binding by detrimental reliance, and then there is no question of the promisor changing their mind. There is a need for detriment and noted the judge focused on Mr Gillett being underpaid. The court instead applied the binding court decision of Wayling v Jones.

"The overwhelming weight of authority shows that detriment is required. But the authorities also show that it is not a narrow or technical concept. The detriment need not consist of the expenditure of money or other quantifiable financial detriment, so long as it is something substantial... There must be sufficient causal link between the assurance relied on and the detriment asserted… Whether the detriment is sufficiently substantial is to be tested by whether it would be unjust or inequitable to allow the assurance to be disregarded - that is, again, the essential test of unconcsionability. The detriment alleged must be pleaded and proved…"

Apart from being underpaid, Mr Gillett said he did not look for other employment, spent more time than a normal employee, spent money improving The Beeches, which was barely habitable when bought in 1971, new fittings and materials, working himself, and took no steps to secure his future, for example through getting a pension. The judge did not look at the matter in the round, and Mr Gillett’s case on detriment ‘was an unusually compelling one.’ What matters is that there would be a detriment if there were no proprietary estoppel claim, citing Dixon J in Grundt v Great Boulder Pty Gold Mines Ltd (1938) 59 CLR 641, 674-5. The freehold of The Beeches farmhouse and the 103 acres (0.42 km^{2}) of land was ordered be transferred, and £100,000 paid to Gillett for exclusion from all the rest of the farming businesses.

== Cases cited ==
=== Disapproved ===
- Taylor v Dickens [1998] 1 FLR 806, EWHC, Ch D

=== Applied ===
- Wayling v Jones [1995] 2 FLR 1029, CA
- In re Basham, deceased [1986] 1 WLR 1498; EWHC, Ch D

== Application ==
=== Considered in ===
- Thorner v Major [2009] UKHL (England & Wales) 18
- Henry v Henry [2010] UKPC 3

=== Distinguished by ===
- Kastner v Jason [2004] EWCA Civ 1599

== See also ==
- English land law
- English trusts law
- English property law
