= Commonwealth v Verwayen =

Judgement of the High Court of Australia

- Court: High Court of Australia
- Full case name: Commonwealth v Bernard Leonardus Verwayen
- Decided: 5 September 1990
- Citations: [1990] HCA 39, (1990) 170 CLR 394

Court membership
- Judges sitting: Mason CJ, Brennan, Deane, Dawson, Toohey, Gaudron & McHugh JJ

Commonwealth v Verwayen, also known as the Voyager case, is a leading case involving estoppel in Australia. Bernard Verwayen sued the Australian government for damages caused by a collision between two ships of the Australian Navy. A representative of the Government initially indicated to Bernard Verwayen that the Government would not raise the statute of limitations as a defence to their negligence. In court however, the Government relied on this defence. While the decision of the High Court was split, a majority of judges found that the Government could not rely on this statement as a defence. Justices Toohey and Gaudron came to this conclusion on the basis that the Government had waived their right to rely on this defence. However, Justices Deane and Dawson came to this conclusion under the doctrine of estoppel, which provides that a defendant can not contradict a previous representation or promise made that has established an assumed state of legal affairs. This case is most frequently referred to in relation to its influence on the doctrine of estoppel.

== Background ==
Bernard Verwayen was an electrical mechanic in the RAN serving on HMAS Voyager, and was injured in the collision with HMAS Melbourne on 10 February 1964. He later sued the government for damages for his injuries.

=== Prior Proceedings ===
Horace Parker was one of the men on the Voyager who died as a result of the collision. Parker had previously been a Chief Electrician in the Navy however he had been discharged and was a civilian working as a Technical Officer at the Naval Dockyard, Williamstown. Voyager had refitted at Williamstown and Parker was on board to make adjustments to her electrical weapon control system. His widow brought a claim in the original jurisdiction of the High Court and the Commonwealth admitted that Parker's death was caused by the negligence of some member or members of the Navy. Windeyer J noted that no one could bring an action for negligence based on anything done in the course of war operations, but that members of the armed services are liable to civilians injured by negligent acts during peacetime. Because Parker was a civilian the Australian Government was liable. Windeyer J however made the following obiter dicta observation:

... as I see the matter at present, the law does not enable a serving member of any of Her Majesty's forces to recover damages from a fellow member because acts done by him in the course of his duty were negligently done.

Despite this case however, the Australian Government adopted a policy that when sued by a member of the military it would not challenge whether a member of the military could sue for damage caused by the negligence of another member of the military. In 1981 the Australian Government changed its policy and asked the High Court to decide that question. In 1982 the High Court unanimously held that a member of the military could sue for damage caused by the negligence of a fellow member. Gibbs CJ put it succinctly, noting that a civilian could recover damages caused by the negligence of a member of the military. Similarly a member of the military could recover damages caused by the negligence of a civilian. There was no principle or policy reason why a person could not recover damages if both were members of the military. Each member of the high Court reached the same conclusion on essentially the same reasoning, expressly leaving open the question of whether the position was different if it involved, war-like activities or training in conditions simulating war.

This opened the possibility of members of the military injured in the Melbourne–Voyager collision to sue for damages. There were however two issues that had to be overcome, (1) the question of whether the collision occurred when training in conditions simulating war, (Note: subsequently referred to as "the Groves defence" by reference to Groves v Commonwealth.) and (2) that 20 years had passed since the incident such that the limitation period had expired.

=== Proceedings ===
The solicitors for Verwayen had acted for a number of survivors following the Groves decision. In September 1984 they wrote to the Australian Government Solicitor prior to Verwayen commencing proceedings, who responded that the Australian Government intended to admit negligence and to waive the limitation period. In November 1984 Verwayen commenced proceedings in the Supreme Court of Victoria. In January 1985, the crown solicitor wrote to Verwayen's solicitor stating: "As you have pointed out, the Commonwealth has admitted negligence and is not pressing the statutory limitation period as a defence. Nevertheless, it still expects claimants to show that they have suffered injury ... and to prove the extent of their injuries and resultant loss, in order to justify an award of damages." In March 1985 the Commonwealth filed its defence which admitted that the collision was caused by the negligence of naval officers and crew and did not plead that the action was commenced outside of the time limit. In November 1985 the government changed its policy to defend proceedings on the basis that it did not owe a civil duty of care to servicemen engaged in operational training.

The matter was given an expedited hearing and was set to be heard by a jury at the end of May 1986. A few days before the hearing the government sought to amend its defence. A Master gave the government permission to amend its defence which caused the trial to be abandoned. Far from being an expedited hearing, this was followed by series of court cases and appeals, in relation to the manner of trial, (Note: Verwayen v Commonwealth, unreported Supreme Court (Vic), Vincent J 10 September 1986; overturned on appeal in Verwayen v Commonwealth [1988] VicRp 29, [1988] VR 203 (21 May 1987), Supreme Court (Full Court) (Vic).) and discovery.

In December 1987 O'Bryan J noted that Verwayen was below deck and not performing any combat activity and held that the duty of navigating a naval vessel with reasonable skill was no different during the training exercise to the duty existing at other times at sea such that there was no public policy reason why Verwayen should be prevented from claiming in negligence, that the Limitation of Actions Act 1958 (Vic) applied, that the waiver of the limitation defence was unilateral and voluntary such that the government could withdraw the waiver. In relation to the doctrine of estoppel O'Bryan J held that promissory estoppel, did not arise because there was no legal relationship and no consideration and that the only way Verwayen altered his position in reliance on the promise was by incurring legal costs. Despite giving judgement for the government and dismissing Verwayen's claim, O'Bryan J was critical of the government's change of position, and ordered the government to pay Verwayen's costs.

Verwayen lodged an appeal to the Full Court. There was a significant change in the law of estoppel two months after the judgment of O'Bryan J, in that the High Court handed down its decision in Waltons Stores (Interstate) Ltd v Maher, where the High Court held that promissory estoppel could constitute a cause of action, where the conduct of the other party was unconscionable. The majority of the Supreme Court, Kaye & Marks JJ, applied the High Court's decision from Walton Stores, holding "In our view, such proofs are met here. There can be little doubt, for example, that the promise by the respondent to admit the claim and not to plead the statute was made deliberately and with the knowledge and intention that the appellant pursue his claim and have his damages assessed. The respondent, we repeat, signed a certificate of readiness and joined more than once in an application by the appellant for a speedy hearing of an assessment of damages." They also held that there was "nothing in the admitted facts to suggest that at the time of collision Voyager was engaged in a military manoeuvre as such or otherwise doing anything which could remotely be described as training for battle." The majority allowed the appeal, which meant that the proceedings had to go to trial on the issues of negligence and damages. King J dissented on the basis that Verwayen could be put in the same position he was in as if the promise had not been made by the Commonwealth paying his legal costs.

The Commonwealth appealed to the High Court.

== Argument ==
The Commonwealth was represented by Michael Black QC who argued that the detriment suffered by Verwayen was incurring legal costs such that the payment of those costs would put him in the same position as if the promise had not been made. The remedy granted by the Supreme Court was disproportionate to the detriment suffered by Verwayen. The Commonwealth also argued that did not owe a duty of care to Mr Verwayen because at the time of the collision the warships were engaged in naval training exercises simulating combat conditions.

Thomson QC, who had appeared for Verwayen at first instance and on appeal, argued that the Full Court of the Supreme Court had correctly applied the law regarding estoppel and that the Commonwealth had waived the limitations defence.

== High Court Decision ==
The majority of the High Court dismissed the appeal, holding that the Commonwealth was barred from pleading a limitation defence to Verwayen's claim in negligence. Each of the seven High Court judges gave their own judgment and each differed in relation to their reasons. Two judges, Deane J and Dawson J held that estoppel prevented the Commonwealth from relying on the limitation defence, two judges Toohey J and Gaudron J held that the Commonwealth had waived its right to rely on the limitation defence. None of the judges considered the combat exercises defence separate from the questions of estoppel and waiver. Gageler and Lim describe the judgement as an illustration of collective irrationality, in that while four judges agreed as to the result, the respondent prevailed despite having a majority against him on each issue.

Summary
Judge	Estoppel	Waiver	Result
Mason CJ	No	No	Appeal upheld
Brennan J	No	No	Appeal upheld
Deane J	Yes	No	Appeal dismissed
Dawson J	Yes	No	Appeal dismissed
Toohey J	No	Yes	Appeal dismissed
Gaudron J	No	Yes	Appeal dismissed
McHugh J	No	No	Appeal upheld

=== Estoppel ===
Equitable estoppel operates where a party makes a representation as to a future state of affairs and the other party relies upon that representation to their detriment. Deane J noted that as an equitable remedy, "an estoppel in equity may not entitle the party raising it to the full benefit of the assumption upon which he relied. The equity is said 'not to compel the party bound to fulfil the assumption or expectation; it is to avoid the detriment which, if the assumption or expectation goes unfulfilled, will be suffered by the party who has been induced to act or to abstain from acting thereon' ... To avoid the detriment may, however, require that the party estopped make good the assumption... But, depending upon the circumstances of the case, the relief required may be considerably less." The Court accepted that Mr Verwayen had relied on an assumption that the Commonwealth would not dispute liability and which the Commonwealth's conduct had induced him to adopt. The purpose of the remedy was to prevent the detriment caused by that reliance. What divided the Court was the extent to which Mr Verwayen had established that he had suffered increased stress, anxiety and ill health as a result of his reliance on the assumption.

Deane J and Dawson J each held that the doctrine of estoppel prevented the Commonwealth from disputing its liability to Verwayen. Dawson J held that "By falsely raising his hopes, the [Commonwealth] led [Mr Verwayen] to continue with the litigation and forgo any exploration of the possibility of settlement thereby subjecting himself to a prolonged period of stress in an action in which the damages claimed were for, amongst other things, a high level of anxiety and depression. I would hold that the appellant was estopped from insisting upon the statute of limitations, and would observe that the equity raised by the [Commonwealth's] conduct was such ... that it could only be accounted for by the fulfilment of the assumption upon which [Mr Verwayen's] actions were based" Deane J went further, adopting an expectation based approach to relief, holding that the assumption should be made good unless that would cause injustice to the person who made the representation. Mr Verwayen had "expended both time and money thereon. Far more important, he subjected himself to the stress, anxiety and inconvenience which were inevitably involved in the pursuit of the proceedings."

Gaudron J adopted a similar approach to Deane J, that the assumption should be made good unless there was an exception. Gaudron J held that the exception was based on avoiding the detriment, stating "The substantive doctrine of estoppel permits a court to do what is required to avoid detriment and does not require the making good of the assumption on which it is founded in every case. Even so, it may be that an assumption should be made good unless it is clear that no detriment will be suffered other than that which can be compensated by some other remedy". Because of her views on waiver, Gaudron J did not decide the matter on this basis.

Each of the dissenting judges did so on the basis that estoppel was intended to avoid the detriment and that because there was no evidence of non-financial loss, compensation for costs was sufficient to avoid that detriment.

Toohey J did not deal with the question of estoppel, but hold that the remedy is a means of avoiding detriment and that in this case it may be achieved by compensating Mr Verwayen for his costs in pursuing the action.

=== Waiver ===
Toohey J and Gaudron J found that Commonwealth had waived its right to rely on the limitation defence. Toohey J limited his consideration to waiver as it exists within the adjudicative process, holding that in that sense waiver "may be found in the deliberate act of a defendant not to rely upon a defence available to him". The Commonwealth had, by it words and actions unequivocally renounced both the limitations defence and the combat exercise defence. Waiver in this sense could not be withdrawn.

Similarly Gaudron J held that "a party to litigation will be held to a position previously taken (that position having been intentionally taken with knowledge) if, as a result of that earlier position, the relationship of the parties has changed."

The history of the expression "waiver" was considered in detail by Mason CJ, noting the robust criticism of the expression waiver, both academically, and judicially. and describing it as an "imprecise term capable of describing different legal concepts, notably election and estoppel". Mason CJ noted the expanding role of estoppel as the rationale for many of the authorities dealing with waiver and limited his consideration to the category of waiver described as election, being a choice between alternative rights that are inconsistent with one another, and, having chosen one, abandons the other.

Deane J held that the "somewhat arbitrary doctrine of waiver is being increasingly absorbed and rationalized by the more flexible doctrine of estoppel by conduct" such that, like Mason CJ, he saw waiver as being confined to cases of election.

The other three judges took a broader view of waiver. Brennan J held that the doctrines of estoppel, waiver and election were distinct and that waiver was the unilateral divestiture of rights. A mere intention not to exercise a right is not immediately effective to divest or sterilize that right, as a right is waived only when the time comes for its exercise and the party for whose sole benefit it has been introduced knowingly abstains from exercising it. In this case because the Commonwealth was given leave to amend to plead the limitation defence, the time for waiving the defence had not arrived. Dawson J also held that a waiver, being the non-insistence upon a right either by choice or by default, existed outside of election or estoppel. He held that, like Brennan J, leave to amend meant that the right had not been waived.

McHugh J also held that there was cases of waiver that could not accurately be categorised as estoppel or election. The Commonwealth's capacity to plead the defence was governed by the principles covering the right to amend. Once the Commonwealth was given leave to amend, the question of waiver did not apply.

== Aftermath ==
Verwayen later received an Order of Australia Medal for his works in assisting other services personnel.
