= Yaxley v Gotts =

1999 English contract law case

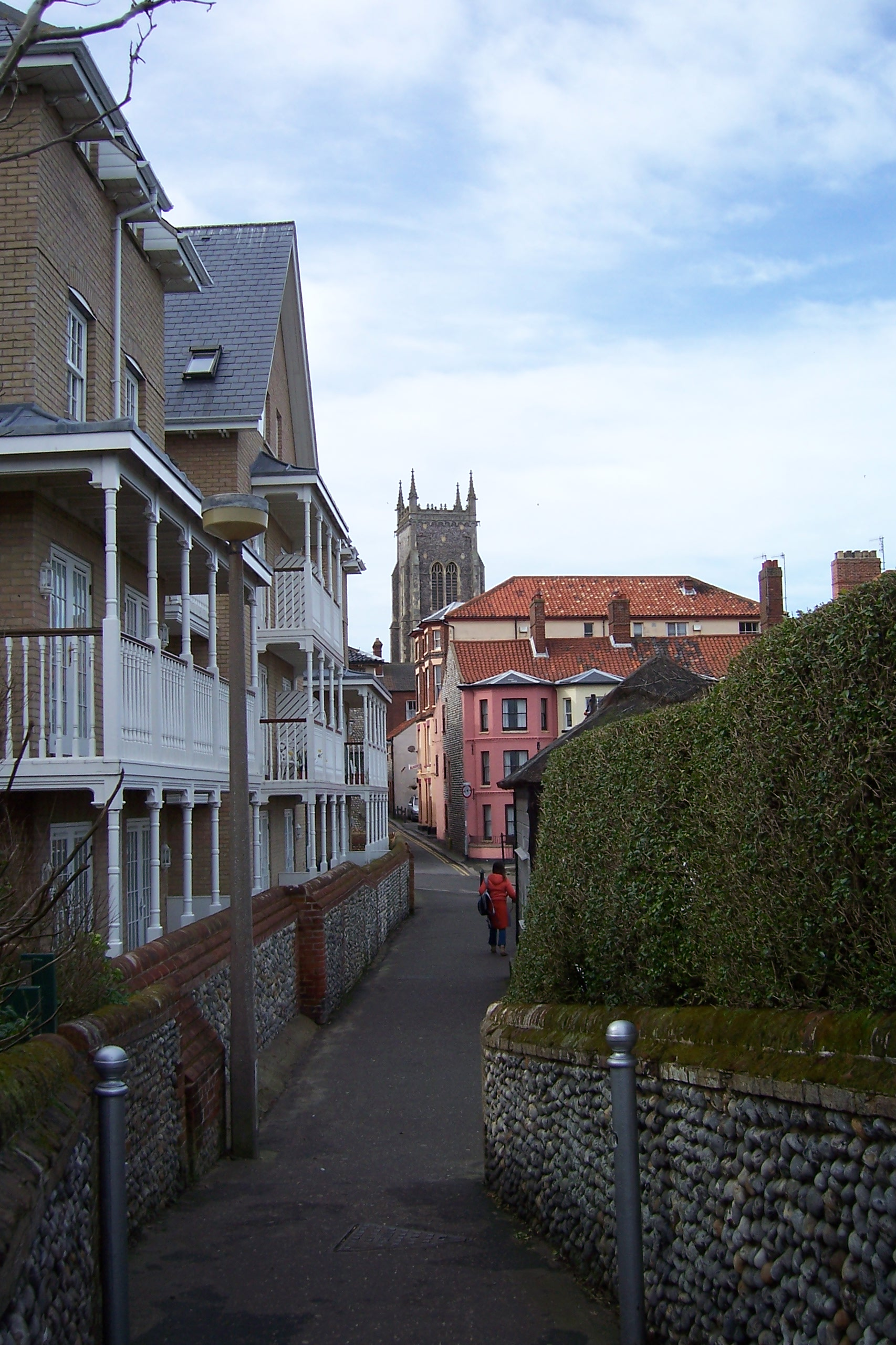
- Court: Court of Appeal
- Full case name: Yaxley (respondent) v Gotts and another (appellants)
- Decided: 24 June 1999
- Citations: [1999] EWCA Civ 3006 [1999] 2 FLR 941 [2000] 1 All ER 711 (2000) 32 HLR 547 [1999] 3 WLR 1217 [1999] 2 EGLR 181 [2000] Ch 162 [1999] EG 92 [1999] Fam Law 700 (2000) 79 P & CR 91
- Transcript: Court-approved transcript of appeal judgment

Case history
- Prior action: Appellants also lost in High Court sitting in the County Court before HHJ Downes.
- Subsequent action: none.

Case opinions
- Decision by: Clarke LJ; Beldam LJ; Walker LJ

Keywords
- Contract, sale of land (grant of lease), section 2(5) Law of Property (Miscellaneous Provisions) Act 1989; fraud or unconscionable conduct; specific performance

Yaxley v Gotts [1999] is an English contract law case with specific relevance to formalities in land law. The case deals with whether section 2 of the Law of Property (Miscellaneous Provisions) Act 1989 which requires that contracts be in writing prevents an oral contract from taking effect where otherwise an interest would arise by proprietary estoppel, i.e. whether the provision in subsection 5 on resulting, implied or constructive trusts covers also proprietary estoppel.

== Facts ==
Yaxley was a self-employed builder who attempted to persuade Gotts to lend him money for the purchase of a building. Gotts instead bought the building but agreed Yaxley could have the bottom floor in return for renovating the other flats and managing the building. After performing the work at his own cost and time. Yaxley argued that an oral agreement between himself and Mr. Gotts was to reward him with ownership of the ground floor of the building. Gotts failed to convey the title deeds in the name of Yaxley. Yaxley sued Gotts.

Whilst the plaintiff was working on the top two floors between January and March 1992, he was doing so in the mistaken belief that Brownie Gotts was the owner of the property; Alan Gotts, the owner, knowing of this mistaken belief, allowed the plaintiff to continue to carry out the work on his property knowing that his father had represented that the plaintiff would have the ground floor.

== Judgment ==
The judge in the case took (found credible) most of the evidence of Yaxley, not that which conflicted from the defendants. In the end, the Judge found an oral contract between the plaintiff and defendants existed. This entitled the plaintiff to ownership in the form of a 99 year lease on the portion of the structure per the agreement.

== Appeal ==
The Gotts' (father and son) appealed. The Court of Appeal dismissed their appeal alleging that the claimant was entitled only to a portion of interest in the lease.

It would not be possible to imply an agreement between the plaintiff and Alan from these facts but they would give rise to a claim of proprietary estoppel. When, from April to September 1992 the plaintiff was working on the ground floor, he by then knew that Alan was the owner but neither Alan nor Brownie had said that the promise made by Brownie was withdrawn. There was a continuing representation of which Alan Gotts was aware that if the plaintiff did the work of converting the ground floor it would be his "forever".

Again it would be difficult to imply a contract between Alan and the plaintiff from these facts but they would support a case of proprietary estoppel. It would be unconscionable for Alan to deny the plaintiff an interest in the property.

[...]

For my part I cannot see that there is any reason to qualify the plain words of Section 2(5). They were included to preserve the equitable remedies to which the Commission had referred. I do not think it inherent in a social policy of simplifying conveyancing by requiring the certainty of a written document that unconscionable conduct or equitable fraud should be allowed to prevail.

In my view the provision that nothing in Section 2 of the 1989 Act is to affect the creation or operation of resulting, implied or constructive trusts effectively excludes from the operation of the section cases in which an interest in land might equally well be claimed by relying on constructive trust or proprietary estoppel. — Clarke LJ

== See also ==
- English land law
  - Law of Property (Miscellaneous Provisions) Act 1989
