= Waltons Stores (Interstate) Ltd v Maher =

Australian contracts case involving the department store

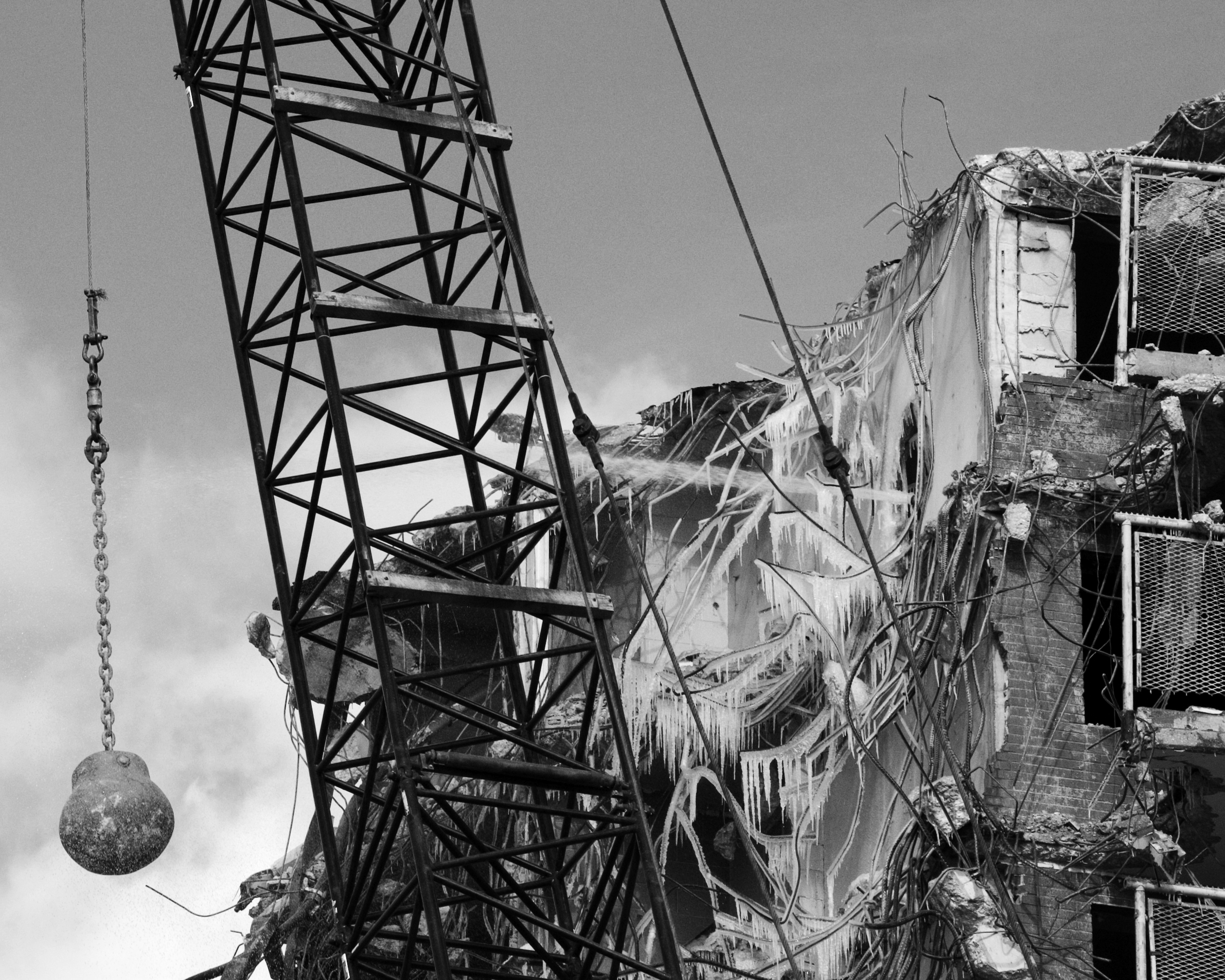
- Court: High Court of Australia
- Decided: 19 February 1988
- Citations: [1988] HCA 7, (1988) 164 CLR 387

Case history
- Prior action: Waltons Stores (Interstate) Ltd v Maher (1986) 5 NSWLR 407
- Appealed from: Court of Appeal (NSW)

Court membership
- Judges sitting: Mason CJ, Wilson, Brennan, Deane and Gaudron JJ

Keywords
- Estoppel, consideration, pre-contractual negotiations

Waltons Stores (Interstate) Ltd v Maher, is a leading case in Australian contract law. The Australian High Court decided that estoppel, in certain circumstances, could be a cause of action.

== Facts ==
Maher owned some property with buildings on it in Nowra. He was negotiating with a department store company called Waltons Stores (at the time controlled by the Bond Corporation) for a lease of the land. They wanted an existing building to be demolished and a new one erected.

In reliance on representations made before a contract was completed, Maher demolished the building and started to erect a new one. But the contract never came to completion because Waltons Stores did not sign the lease as Maher had yelled at them and become hostile towards them. Waltons told their solicitors to slow the deal while they did further investigations as to whether the transaction would be good business, but allowed Maher to remain under the impression that the deal would be completed.

== Judgment ==
The High Court held that to avoid detriment through Waltons' unconscionable behaviour, Waltons was estopped from denying the contract. Whilst the mere exercise of legal right not to exchange contracts was not unconscionable, there were two additional elements which made Waltons' conduct unconscionable: a) element of urgency, b) Maher executed and forwarded on 11/11 and assumed execution by Walton was a formality. The award (though very similar to an expectation interest, as if it were a contract that was enforced) was only meant to cover reliance. Because Maher had acted to his detriment, in reliance on the encouragement of Walton Stores, which had acted unconscionably, equity would intervene.

Brennan J said the following

27. But there are differences between a contract and an equity created by estoppel. A contractual obligation is created by the agreement of the parties; an equity created by estoppel may be imposed irrespective of any agreement by the party bound. A contractual obligation must be supported by consideration; an equity created by estoppel need not be supported by what is, strictly speaking, consideration. The measure of a contractual obligation depends on the terms of the contract and the circumstances to which it applies; the measure of an equity created by estoppel varies according to what is necessary to prevent detriment resulting from unconscionable conduct.

28. In Combe v Combe Denning L.J. limited the application of promissory estoppel, as he expounded the doctrine, to ensure that it did not displace the doctrine of consideration. His Lordship's solution of the problem was to hold that the promise should not itself be a cause of action, but merely the foundation of a defensive equity. He said (at p 220):

"Seeing that the principle never stands alone as giving a cause of action in itself, it can never do away with the necessity of consideration when that is an essential part of the cause of action. The doctrine of consideration is too firmly fixed to be overthrown by a side-wind."

29. The remedy offered by promissory estoppel has been limited to preventing the enforcement of existing legal rights. In Crabb v Arun District Council Lord Denning M.R. said, at p 188, that if a person -

" by his words or conduct, so behaves as to lead another to believe that he will not insist on his strict legal rights - knowing or intending that the other will act on that belief - and he does so act, that again will raise an equity in favour of the other; and it is for a court of equity to say in what way the equity may be satisfied."

If the object of the principle were to make a promise binding in equity, the need to preserve the doctrine of consideration would require a limitation to be placed on the remedy. But there is a logical difficulty in limiting the principle so that it applies only to promises to suspend or extinguish existing rights. If a promise by A not to enforce an existing right against B is to confer an equitable right on B to compel fulfilment of the promise, why should B be denied the same protection in similar circumstances if the promise is intended to create in B a new legal right against A? There is no logical distinction to be drawn between a change in legal relationships effected by a promise which extinguishes a right and a change in legal relationships effected by a promise which creates one. Why should an equity of the kind to which Combe v. Combe refers be regarded as a shield but not a sword? The want of logic in the limitation on the remedy is well exposed in Mr David Jackson's essay "Estoppel as a Sword" in (1965) 81 Law Quarterly Review 84,223 at pp 241-243.

[...]

34. The foregoing review of the doctrine of promissory estoppel indicates that the doctrine extends to the enforcement of voluntary promises on the footing that a departure from the basic assumptions underlying the transaction between the parties must be unconscionable. As failure to fulfil a promise does not of itself amount to unconscionable conduct, mere reliance on an executory promise to do something, resulting in the promisee changing his position or suffering detriment, does not bring promissory estoppel into play. Something more would be required. Humphreys Estate suggests that this may be found, if at all, in the creation or encouragement by the party estopped in the other party of an assumption that a contract will come into existence or a promise will be performed and that the other party relied on that assumption to his detriment to the knowledge of the first party.

Brennan J, Deane J and Gaudron J gave concurring judgments.

== See also ==
- Combe v Combe [1951] 2 KB 215
- Crabb v Arun DC [1976] Ch 176
- Williams v Roffey Bros Ltd
- Baird Textile Holdings Ltd v Marks & Spencer plc [2001] EWCA Civ 274
- Promissory estoppel
