= Willmott v Barber =

English legal case

- Court: Chancery Division
- Citation: (1880) 15 Ch D 96

Court membership
- Judge sitting: Fry J

Keywords
- Proprietary estoppel

Willmott v Barber, (1880) 15 Ch D 96, is an 1880 English case decided by Justice Edward Fry. The case is often cited for its holding regarding the doctrine of estoppel by acquiescence or proprietary estoppel.

The plaintiff, Willmott, was suing two defendants, John Barber and William Bowyer. Barber had agreed to sell the plaintiff a leasehold interest in land. He also agreed that he would compel Bowyer, the holder of another lease, to consent to the assignment of that lease. The plaintiff argued that Bowyer was precluded (estopped) from objecting to the assignment, even though he had the legal power to make such an objection.

The plaintiff claimed that Barber and Bowyer were acting in collusion, and that Bowyer had refused assent to the assignment on Barber's instructions. Therefore, allowing him to refuse consent would work a gross fraud upon the plaintiff.

The court held that the plaintiff could prevail only if he established all of the elements. First, he must establish that he had made a mistake as to his legal rights. Second, he must have expended money or done some act in reliance on the mistaken belief. Third, the defendant must know that his right is inconsistent with the acts of the plaintiff. Fourthly, the plaintiff must have proof that the land owner was aware of his title. Finally, the defendant must have actively encouraged the plaintiff in acting to his detriment. These are known as the five probanda of Fry J. in Willmott v Barber.

In this case, the court held that the plaintiff had not established all of these element. Therefore, the defendant could not be compelled to consent to the assignment.

While it is cited in many contracts casebooks used in American law schools, Willmott is rarely cited by American courts. It is, however, cited fairly frequently by British and Canadian courts. For example, in Desoto Resources Limited v. Encana Corporation, 2010 ABQB 448, the Alberta Court of Queen's Bench cites it as the "classic statement of the constituent elements of estoppel by acquiescence."

The full text of the decision is available at Google Books.
