= Proprietary estoppel =

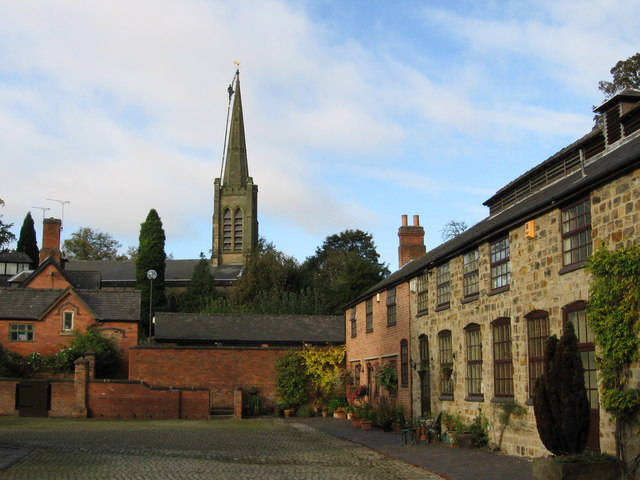
In Greasley v Cooke, over a house in Riddings, the Court of Appeal affirmed that once an assurance is found, the burden of proof is on the defendant to show that it was not relied on to the claimant's detriment.

Proprietary estoppel is a legal claim, especially connected to English land law, which may arise in relation to rights to use the property of the owner. It may even be effective in connection with disputed transfers of ownership. Proprietary estoppel transfers rights if

- someone is given a clear assurance that they will acquire a right over property,
- they reasonably rely on the assurance,
- they act substantially to their detriment on the strength of the assurance, and
- it would be unconscionable to go back on the assurance.

If these elements of assurance, reliance and detriment, and unconscionability are present, the usual remedy will be that the property will be transferred to the claimant, if the court views the reliance to warrant a claim in all the circumstances.

In English law, proprietary estoppel is distinct from promissory estoppel.

== History ==
In 1862, in Dillwyn v Llewelyn, a son was held to have acquired a house from his father because he was given a written notice that he would, despite never having completed a deed for conveyance, after the son spent time and money improving the property. In Willmott v Barber, Fry J considered that five elements had to be established before proprietary estoppel could operate:

- the claimant must have made a mistake as to his legal rights;
- the claimant must have done some act of reliance;
- the defendant, the possessor of a legal right, must know of the existence of his own right which is inconsistent with the right claimed by the claimant;
- the defendant must know of the claimant's mistaken belief; and
- the defendant must have encouraged the claimant in his act of reliance.

These elements were, however, refined by future case law over the later 20th century and in the early 21st century. Indeed, the High Court of Australia in Waltons Stores (Interstate) Ltd v Maher recognised that both the principles of proprietary and promissory estoppel encompass the broader principle of equitable estoppel.

== Acquisition of rights ==
Proprietary estoppel is one of four principal mechanisms to acquire rights over property, seen particularly in the case of land (the others being a contract, an implied trust, and adverse possession).

Unlike a contract or gift, which depend on consent, or resulting and constructive trusts that depend primarily on the fact of contribution, a proprietary estoppel arises when a person has been given a clear assurance, it was reasonable of them to rely on the assurance, and they have acted to their detriment. This threefold pattern of proprietary estoppel (clear assurance, reasonable reliance and substantial detriment) makes it consistent with its partner in the law of obligations, "promissory estoppel".

Although English law has not yet recognised promissory estoppel as giving rise to a cause of action (as has been done under the American Restatement (Second) of Contracts §90 and by the Australian High Court in Waltons Stores (Interstate) Ltd v Maher), in Cobbe v Yeoman's Row Management Ltd Lord Scott remarked that proprietary estoppel should be seen as a sub-species of promissory estoppel. In all cases it allows people who act on others' assurances about legal rights, even without them attaining express agreement. For example, in Crabb v Arun District Council a farmer acquired the right to a path over the council's land, because they had assured him that if he sold off one portion an access point would remain. In all cases, the minimum pattern of an assurance, reliance and some form of detriment is present.

The High Court also recently confirmed that the onus of proof in relation to detrimental reliance cannot be shifted to the estopped party.

== Reliance ==
Proprietary estoppel case law has, however, divided on the question of what kind of assurance and what kind of reliance must be present. In Cobbe v Yeoman's Row Management Ltd, a property developer claimed an interest in a group of Knightsbridge flats after his expense in obtaining council planning permission. Mr Cobbe had made an oral agreement with the flat owner, Mrs Lisle-Mainwaring, to get the flats at £12m, but once permission was obtained, the owner broke her oral promise. Even so, in the House of Lords Mr Cobbe failed in his claim for anything more than the expense (£150,000) of getting the planning, because in this commercial context it was clear that formal deeds were needed for completion of any deal.

By contrast, in Thorner v Major, David (a second cousin) worked on Peter's farm for 30 years and believed he would inherit it. This probably was intended but after Peter fell out with other relatives, he destroyed his will, leaving David with nothing. Even though no specific assurance, and only some vague conduct indicating an assurance, was present, the House of Lords held that David had a good proprietary estoppel claim. Lord Hoffmann remarked that if a reasonable person could understand, however oblique and allusive, that an assurance was given, a legal right would accrue. The tendency of the cases is therefore to recognise claims more in the domestic context, in which less formal assurances are common, and less in the commercial context, where formality is normal.

== Remedial flexibility ==
A difficult issue, however, in awarding a remedy for estoppel is that unlike a contract it is not always apparent that a claimant should receive the full measure of what they had expected. By contrast, the factual pattern of estoppels, which often appear something very close to a contract, often seem to warrant more than an award for damages to compensate claimants for the amount of detriment, or loss, as in a tort case.

In Jennings v Rice, Robert Walker LJ tackled the issue by emphasising that the purpose of the court's jurisdiction was to avoid an unconscionable result, and to ensure that a remedy was based on proportionality. Here, Mr Jennings had worked as a gardener for a Mrs Royle since the 1970s, but the administrator of her estate had no will. Mr Jennings had been told he "would be alright" and more so that "this will all be yours one day". The Court of Appeal resolved, however, that not the full estate, worth £1.285m, but only £200,000 would be awarded in view of the actual detriment incurred by Mr Jennings and the uncertainty of what his assurances really meant. In relation to third parties, the remedy for proprietary estoppel has been confirmed to bind others by the Land Registration Act 2002 section 116.

In Giumelli v Giumelli, notwithstanding that the High Court of Australia held that the requirements of proprietary estoppel had been established, the plaintiff was not awarded a proprietary interest in the land. Instead, monetary compensation was ordered by the Court in taking into account of other factors, such as other family members had worked and lived the land.

== United States law ==
The term "proprietary estoppel" is not used in American law, but is part and parcel of the general doctrine of promissory estoppel.

== See also ==
- Promissory estoppel
- Estoppel
