= Crabb v Arun DC =

English land and contract law case

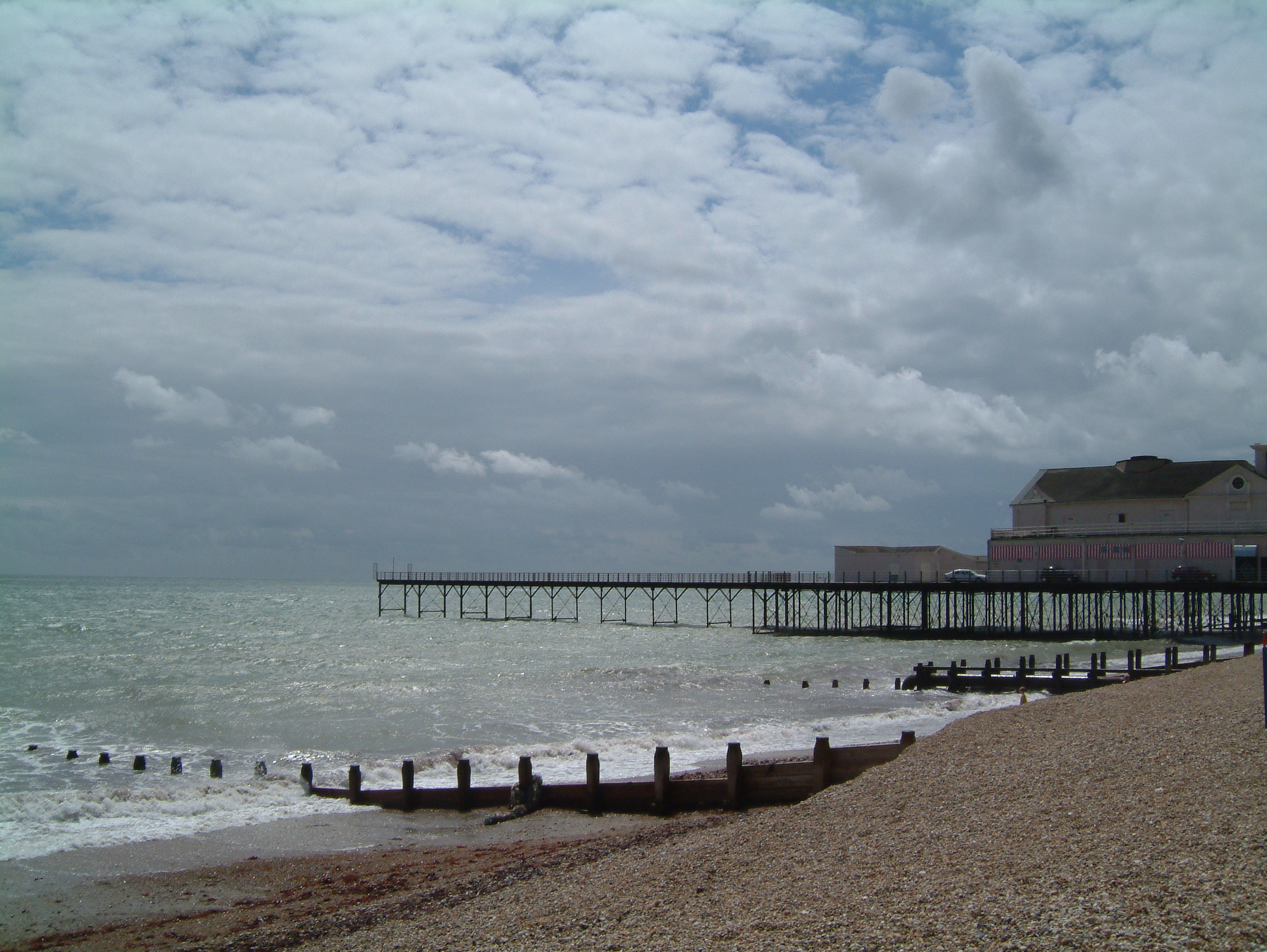
- Court: Court of Appeal
- Citations: [1975] EWCA Civ 7, [1976] 1 Ch 179

Case opinions
- Lord Denning MR

Keywords
- Proprietary estoppel, consideration

Crabb v Arun District Council [1975] EWCA Civ 7 is a leading English land law and contract case concerning "proprietary estoppel". Lord Denning MR affirmed that where agreements concern the acquisition of rights over land, there is no need for both parties to provide a consideration for upholding the bargain. While promissory estoppel cannot found a cause of action it was held that in the peculiar situation of land, consideration is not necessary at all.

== Facts ==
In 1965 Mr Victor Crabb bought 2 acres of land in the sea-side village of Pagham, near Bognor Regis. His boundary onto 3 1/2 acres to the west, demarcated by publicly owned Mill Park Road, belonged to Arun District Council (ADC) (formerly Chichester Rural District Council). His north boundary faced Hook Lane. He thought he enjoyed two access points on Mill Park Road, which led up to Hook Lane, and out of the village, point "A" and point "B". The access point "A" was open by virtue of a formalised easement, granted when the previous owner of the whole 5 1/2 acres had sold the property on to the current owners, Access point "B" was open only because the council was letting Crabb use it, with no formal written agreement in place.

In February 1968 ADC put up gates at point "A" and "B". Crabb believing that he had assurances to use both gates, sold off the northern half of the land, where access point "A" was. For the southern half of the land, he relied on having access point "B" open. In January 1969 he secured the inside of the gate at point "B" with padlocks. ADC responded by replacing the gates with a fence. Crabb asked for to access point to be re-opened. ADC said they would in return for £3000. Crabb subsequently sued the council, alleging that he had been given an assurance that the gates would remain open.

The trial judge found that Crabb had received no formal or firm assurance, but more importantly, if there was, Crabb had given no consideration in return for it, and it was not enforceable. Crabb appealed the decision.

== Judgment ==
Lord Denning MR held that the promise could be enforced, and that a right of access over ADC's land be made way for. It was also ruled it may have been appropriate for Crabb to pay some amount for the cost of the works in relation to the erection and removal of the fence, but as the land had been unusable for the five or six years the fence had been in place, Crabb had no financial liability in relation to the costs related to the fence being erected or removed.

When Mr Millett, QC, for Mr Crabb said that he put his case on an estoppel, it shook me a little: because it is commonly supposed that estoppel is not itself a cause of action. But that is because there are estoppels and estoppels. Some do give rise to a cause of action. Some do not. In the species of estoppel called proprietary estoppel, it does give rise to a cause of action. We had occasion to consider it a month ago in Moorgate Mercantile v Twitchings [1975] 3 WLR 286 where I said that the effect of estoppel on the true owner may be that

"his own title to the property, be it land or goods, had been held to be limited or extinguished, and new rights and interests have been created therein and this operates by reason of his conduct - what he has led the other to believe - even though he never intended it."

The new rights and interests, created by estoppel, in or over land, will be protected by the Courts and in this way give rise to a cause of action. This was cited in Spencer, Bower and Turner on estoppel by Representation, Second Edition (1966) at pages 279 to 282.

The basis of this proprietary estoppel - as indeed of promissory estoppel - is the interposition of equity. Equity comes in, true to form, to mitigate the rigours of strict law. The early cases did not speak of it as "estoppel". They spoke of it as "raising an equity". If I may expand that, Lord Cairns said: "It is the first principle upon which all Courts of Equity proceed", that it will prevent a person from insisting on his strict legal rights - whether arising under a contract, or on his title deeds, or by statute - when it would be inequitable for him to do so having regard to the dealings which have taken place between the parties, see Hughes v Metropolitan Railway Co (1877) 2 AC 448. What then are the dealings which will preclude him from insisting on his strict legal rights? -If he makes a binding contract that he will not insist on the strict legal position, a Court of Equity will hold him to his contract. Short of a binding contract, if he makes a promise that he will not insist upon his strict legal rights - then, even though that promise may be unenforceable in point of law for want of consideration or want of writing - then, if he makes the premise knowing or intending that the other will act upon it, and he does act upon it, then again a Court of Equity will not allow him to go back on that promise, see Central London Property Trust v High Trees House (1947) KB 130: Richards (Charles) v Oppenhaim (1950) KB 616, 623. Short of an actual promise, if he, by his words or conduct, so behaves as to lead another to believe that he will not insist on his strict legal rights - knowing or intending that the other will act on that belief - and he does so act, that again will raise an equity in favour of the other: and it is for a Court of Equity to say in what way the equity may be satisfied. The cases show that this equity does not depend on agreement but on words or conduct. In Bamsden v Dyson (1866) LR 1 HL at page 170 Lord Kingsdown spoke of a verbal agreement "or what amounts to the same thing, an expectation, created or encouraged." In Birmingham & District Land Co v The London & North Western Railway (1888) 40 Ch D at page 277, Lord Justice Cotton said that

".... what passed did not make a new agreement but what took place .... raised an equity against him."

And it was the Privy Council who said that

".... the Court must look at the circumstances in each case to decide in what way the equity can be satisfied"

giving instances, see Plimmer v City of Wellington Corporation (1884) 9 AC 713-4.

Recent cases afford illustrations of the principle. In Inwards v Baker (1965) 2 QB 29, it was held that, despite the legal title being in the plaintiffs, the son had an equity to remain in the bungalow "as long as he desired to use it as his home." Mr. Justice Danckwerts said (at page 38):

"Equity protects him so that an injustice may not be perpetrated."

In ER Ives Investment Ltd v High (1967) 2 QB 379, it was held that High and his successors had an equity which could only be satisfied by allowing him to have a right of access over the yard, "so long as the block of flats has its foundations on his land." In Siew Soon Hah v Wang Tong Hong [1973] AC 837, the Privy Council held that there was an "equity or equitable estoppel protecting the defendant in his occupation for 30 years". In Bank Negara Indonesia v Philip Foallm (1973) 2 Malaya Law Journal the Privy Council held that, despite the fact that he had no protection under the Rent Acts, he had an equity to remain "so long as he continued to practise his profession."

The question then is: were the circumstances here such as to raise an equity in favour of Mr. Crabb? True the Council on the deeds had the title to their land, free of any access at point B. But they led Mr. Crabb to believe that he had or would be granted a right of access at point B. At the meeting of 26th July, 1967, Mr. Alford and Mr. Crabb told the Council's representative that Mr. Crabb intended to split the two acres into two portions and wanted to have an access at point B for the back portion: and the Council's representative agreed that he should have this access. I do not think the Council can avoid responsibility by saying that their representative had no authority to agree this. They entrusted him with the task of setting out the line of the fence and the gates: and they must be answerable for his conduct in the course of it, see Attorney-General to the Prince of Wales v Collom (1916) 2 KB at page 207: Moorgate Mercantile v Twitchings (1973) 3 WLR at page 298 A-B.

The judge found that there was "no definite assurance" by the Council's representative, and "no firm commitment", but only an "agreement in principle", meaning I suppose that, as Alford said, there were "some further processes" to be gone through before it would become binding. But if there were any such processes in the mind of the parties, the subsequent conduct of the Council was such as to dispense with them. The Council actually put up the gates at point B at considerable expense. That certainly led Crabb to believe that they agreed that he should have the right of access through point B without more ado.

The judge also said that, to establish this equity or estoppel, the Council must have known that Crabb was selling the front portion without reserving a right of access for the back portion. I do not think this was necessary. The Council knew that Crabb intended to sell the two portions separately and that he would need an access at point B as well as point A. Seeing that they knew of his intention - and they did nothing to disabuse him but rather confirmed it by erecting gates at point B - it was their conduct which led him to act as he did: and this raises an equity in his favour against them.

In the circumstances it seems to me inequitable that the Council should insist on their strict title as they did: and to take the highhanded action of pulling down the gates without a word of warning: and to demand of Crabb £3,000 as the price for the easement. If he had moved at once for an injunction in aid of his equity - to prevent them removing the gates - I think he should have been granted it. But he did not do so. He tried to negotiate terms, but these failing, the action has come for trial. And we have the question: In what way now should the equity be satisfied?

Here equity is displayed at its most flexible, see Snell's Equity, 27th edition, page 568, and the illustrations there given. If the matter had been finally settled in 1967, I should have thought that, although nothing was said at the meeting in July 1967, nevertheless it would be quite reasonable for the Council to ask Crabb to pay something for the access at point B, perhaps - and I am guessing - some hundreds of pounds. But, as Millett pointed out in the course of the argument, because of the Council's conduct, the back land has been landlocked. It has been sterile and rendered useless for five or six years: and Mr. Crabb has been unable to deal with it during that time. This loss to him can be taken into account. And at the present time, it seems to me that, in order to satisfy the equity, Mr. Crabb should have the right of access at point B free of charge without paying anything for it.

I would, therefore, hold that Crabb, as the owner of the back portion, has a right of access at point B over the verge on to Mill Park Road and a right of way along that road to Hook Lane without paying compensation. I would allow the appeal and declare that he has an easement, accordingly.

Lawton LJ gave a shorter concurring judgment.

Scarman LJ said the following.

In such a case I think it is now well settled law that the Court, having analysed and assessed the conduct and relationship of the parties, has to answer three questions. First, is there an equity established? Secondly, what is the extent of the equity, if one is established? And, thirdly, what is the relief appropriate to satisfy the equity? See:- The Duke of Beaufort v Patrick (1853) 17 Beavan 60; Plimmer v Wellington Corporation (1884) 9 A.C. 699; and Inwards v Baker (1965) 2 Q.B. 29, a decision of this Court, and particularly the observations of the tester of the Rolls at page 37. Such therefore I believe to be the nature of the inquiry that the Courts have to conduct in a case of this sort. In pursuit of that inquiry I do not find helpful the distinction between promissory and proprietary estoppel. This distinction may indeed be valuable to those who have to teach or expound the law; but I do not think that, in solving the particular problem raised by a particular case, putting the law into categories is of the slightest assistance.

[...]

I turn now to the other two questions - the extent of the equity and the relief needed to satisfy it. There being no grant, no enforceable contract, no licence, I would analyse the minimum equity to do justice to the plaintiff as a right either to an easement or to a licence upon terms to be agreed. I do not think it is necessary to go further than that. Of course, going that far would support the equitable remedy of injunction which is sought in this action. If there is no agreement as to terms, if agreement fails to be obtained, the Court can, in my judgment, and must, determine in these proceedings upon what terms the plaintiff should be put to enable him to have the benefit of the equitable right which he's held to have. It is interesting that there has been some doubt amongst distinguished lawyers in the past as to whether the Court can so proceed. Lord Kingsdown refers in fact to those doubts in a passage, which I need not quote, at page 171 of his speech in Ramsden v Dyson. Lord Thurlow clearly thought that the Court did have this power. Other lawyers of that time did not. But there can be no doubt that since Ramsden v Dyson the Courts have acted upon the basis that they have to determine not only the extent of the equity, but also the conditions necessary to satisfy it, and they have done so in a great number and variety of cases. I need refer only to the interesting collection of cases enumerated in Snell on Equity, 27th edition at pages 567 to 568: paragraph 2(b). In the present case the Court doe3 have to consider what is necessary now in order to satisfy the plaintiff's equity. Had matters taken a different turn, I would without hesitation have said that the plaintiff should be put upon terms to be agreed if possible with the defendants, and, if not agreed, settled by the Court. But, as already mentioned by the Master of the Rolls and my Lord, Lord Justice Lawton, there has been a history of delay, and indeed highhandedness, which it is impossible to disregard. In January 1969 the defendants, for reasons which no doubt they thought good at the time, without consulting the plaintiff, locked up his land. They removed not only the padlocks which he had put on the gates at point B, but the gates themselves. In their place they put a fence - rendering access impossible save by breaking down the fence. I am not disposed to consider whether or not the defendants are to be blamed in moral terms for what they did. I just do not know. But the effect of their action has been to sterilise the plaintiff's land; and for the reasons which I have endeavoured to give, such action was an infringement of an equitable right possessed by the plaintiff. It has involved him in loss, which has not been measured; but, since it amounted to sterilisation of an industrial estate for a very considerable period of time, it must surpass any sort of sum of money which the plaintiff ought reasonably, before it was done, to have paid the authority in order to obtain an enforceable legal right, I think therefore that nothing should now be paid by the plaintiff and that he should receive at the hands of the Court the belated protection of the equity that he has established. Reasonable terms, other than money payment, should be agreed: or, if not agreed, determined by the Court.

== See also ==
- English contract law
- English trusts law
