= Mikeover Ltd v Brady =

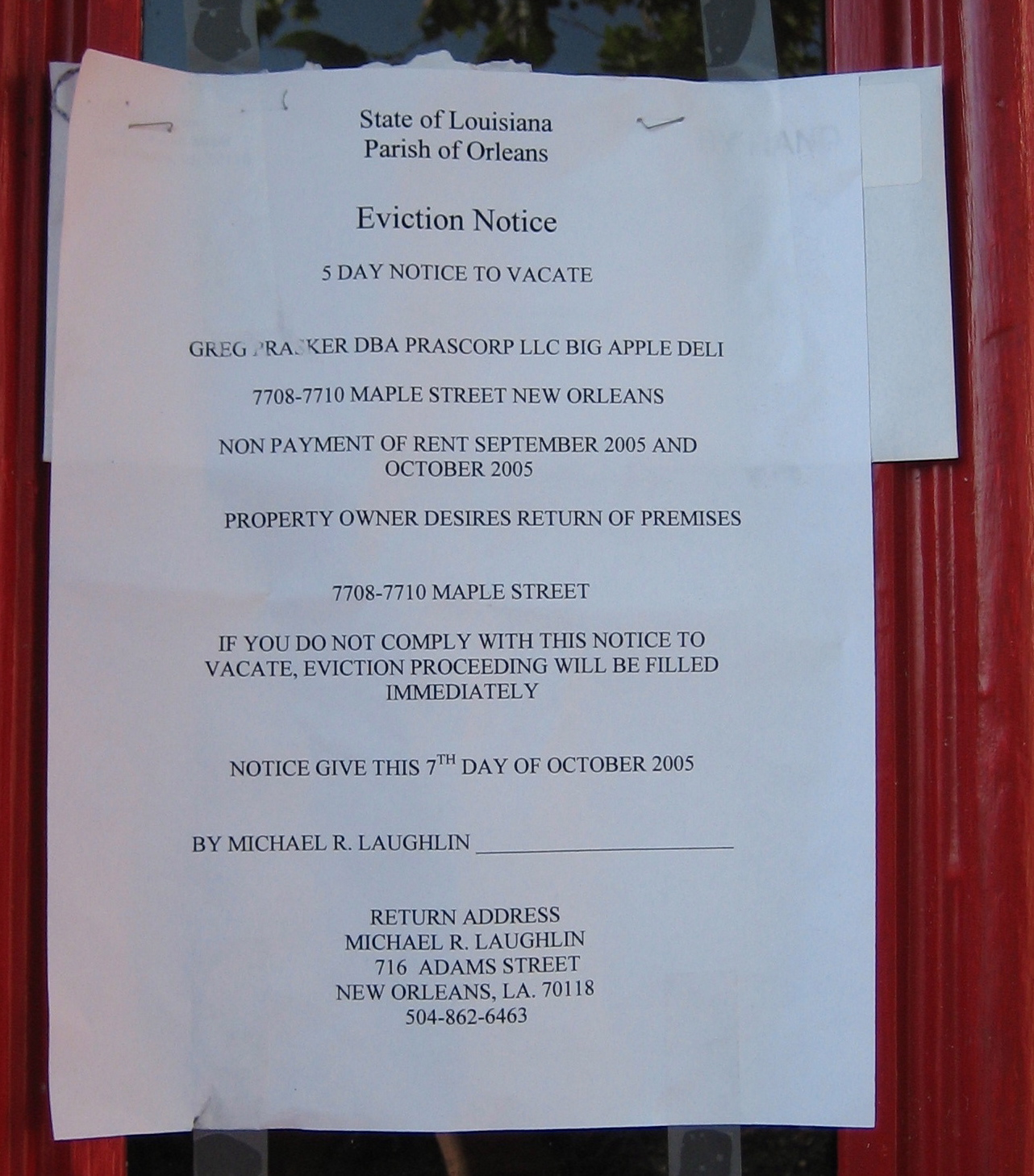
- An eviction notice (which will have been posted or process-served per rules)
- Court: Court of Appeal
- Decided: 26 May 1989
- Citations: [1989] EWCA Civ 1 [1989] 3 All ER 618 (1990) 59 P&CR 218 [1989] 40 EG 92 [1989] 2 EGLR 61; 21 HLR 513
- Transcript: HTML Version of Judgment at bailii.org

Case history
- Prior actions: Appellant also lost in the court below, first instance
- Subsequent action: none

Court membership
- Judges sitting: Anthony Lincoln J Slade LJ

Case opinions
- Held: These two agreements...were incapable in law of creating a joint tenancy, because the monetary obligations of the two parties were not joint obligations and there was accordingly no complete unity of interest. It follows that there was no joint tenancy. Since inter se [between themselves] Miss Guile and the defendant had no power to exclude each other from occupation of any part of the premises, it also follows that their respective several rights can never have been greater than those of licensees during the period of their joint occupation
- Decision by: Slade LJ

Keywords
- Lease

Mikeover Ltd v Brady [1989] is an English land law case, concerning the definition of leases, specifically a standard tenancy as opposed to a licence. Here a licence was confirmed and upheld where two former co-habitees had fallen out and separated; removing from the remaining licensee, in arrears, the extra time to remain afforded by the old Rent Act 1977 type tenancies which he hoped to benefit from.

== Facts ==
Mikeover Ltd had leased 179 Southgate Rd, London, N1, and then let it out to Mr Brady and Miss Guile. They each signed separate but identical 'licence' agreements allowing them to share for six months for £86.66 a month. After the sixth months expired they were allowed to remain on the same terms. Miss Guile moved out early 1986, telling Mr Ferster, the Mikeover Ltd director, in April 1986. Mr Brady offered to continue to pay £173.32 in rent. Mr Ferster replied 'I can't accept it. I'll hold you responsible for your share only.' But Mr Brady still fell into arrears for his half, and Mikeover Ltd tried to remove him in early 1987. He claimed he had a lease of the flat to get Rent Act protection.

County Court held they had only licences.

== Judgment ==
Slade LJ held they had only licences. There was exclusive possession in common with the other occupier, but there was no unity of interest, and no joint tenancy, and the limitation on payments to their own shares was pivotal. This meant the arrangements were incapable of creating a joint tenancy because the obligations were not joint. There was no sham. It was established that there must be the four unities present, of possession, interest, title and time, and there was no unity of interest because there was only a several obligation for payment of the rent. That requires the existence of 'joint rights and joint obligations'.

Following devoutly the likewise 1989 case of Stribling, Slade LJ added:

Parker LJ with whose judgment Fox LJ and Sir Denys Buckley agreed, said:

"The three licences were in substance and reality just what they purported to be. The right, specifically given under each of termination on 28 days' notice by either side, and the provision whereby each was responsible only for a specific sum which was in fact one third of the total required by the landlord, are wholly inconsistent with a joint tenancy."

The entire inconsistency with a joint tenancy of a provision rendering each licensee responsible only for one third of the total required by the landlord was, as we read Stribling v Wickham, part of the essential reasoning which led this court to its final decision.

== Commentary ==
Academic critque published by journal: it is not clear why there is a requirement for a genuine (factual) joint tenancy [at all times of occupancy], when there is no such requirement for having a freehold together.

== Cases approved and followed ==
- Stribling v Wickham (EWCA, March 15, 1989, unreported)

== Precedent applied ==
- Obiter dictum of Lord Templeman and Obiter dictum of Lord Jauncey in Antoniades, below.

== Cases distinguished ==
- Antoniades v Villiers
- Street v Mountford

== See also ==
- English land law
- English trusts law
- English property law
