= Thomas Sorrell =

Thomas Sorrell may refer to:

- Thomas W. Sorrell, law enforcement officer from Vermont
- Tom Sorell, Canadian philosopher

== See also ==
- Thomas v Sorrell, an English law case concerning licences
