= Winter Garden Theatre (London) Ltd v Millennium Productions Ltd =

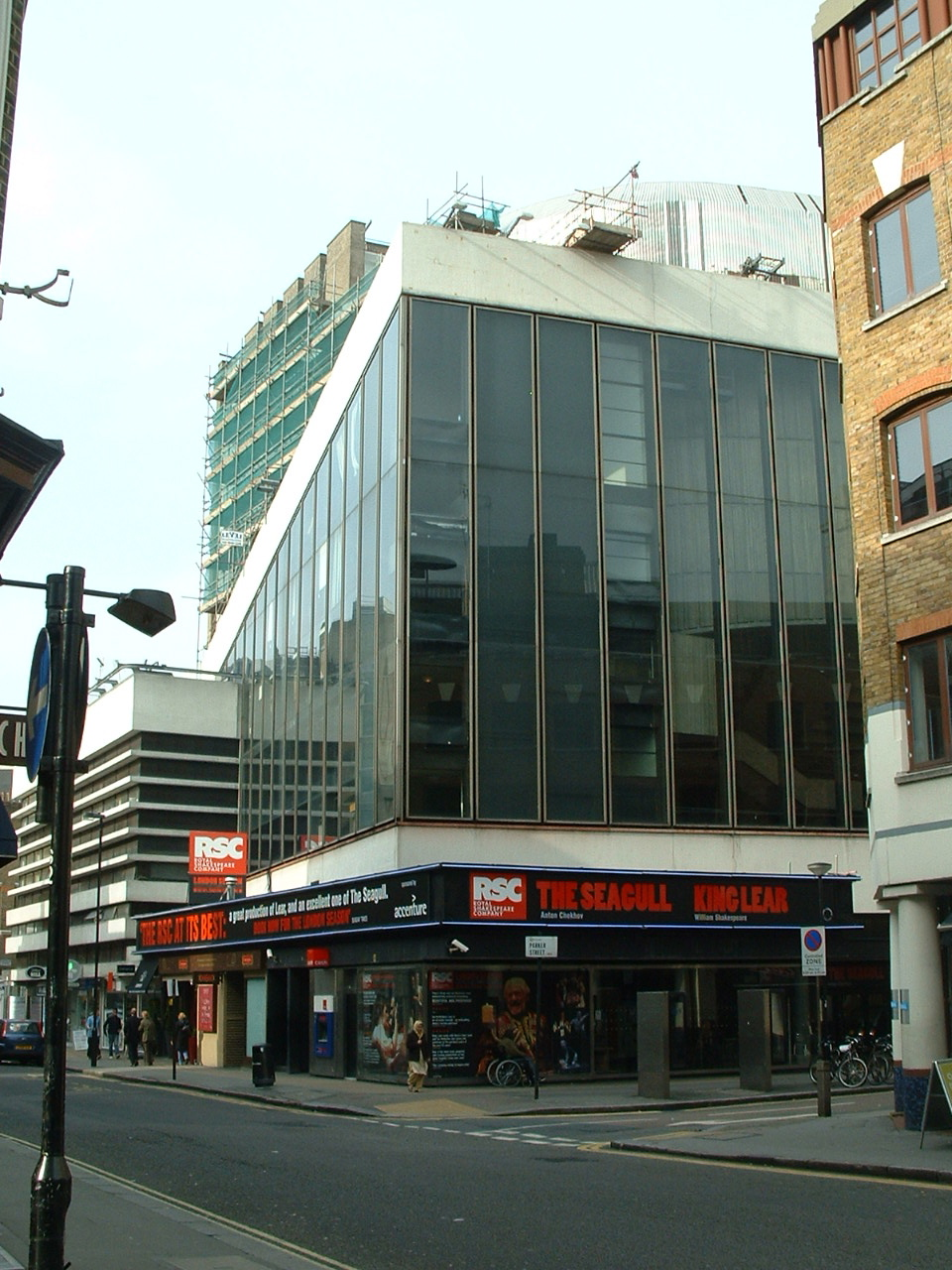
- Court: House of Lords
- Citation: [1948] AC 173

Keywords
- Licence; revocation on notice; whether reasonableness to be considered; whether to depart from agreed contract terms; theatre production

Winter Garden Theatre (London) Ltd v Millennium Productions Ltd [1948] AC 173 is an English land law case, concerning licences in land.

== Facts ==
At the Winter Garden Theatre (now the Gillian Lynne Theatre on Drury Lane) the owner promised Millennium Productions Ltd that it could use the theatre for six months, with an option to renew for another six months, and after that it could continue for a flat weekly price of £300. Millennium would have to give a month's notice if it wished to terminate, but Winter Garden's obligations were not stated. The licence continued for over a year, to September 1945. Then Millennium made a contract with artists to show Young Mrs Barrington, from 5 September till January 1946, but on 13 September Winter Garden decided to revoke the licence, giving a month's notice, and demanding it leave on 13 October. Millennium argued that there was a breach of contract and that Winter Garden could only revoke if Millennium was in breach of contract, or that there had to be a (revised) reasonable notice period, one month no longer being reasonable.

== Judgment ==
The House of Lords held that Winter Garden could revoke the licence. Viscount Simon said that someone who gives a licence, revoking it mid-use, to cross land would not make the licensee a trespasser until they were off the premises, but then future crossing rights would cease.

The effect of a licence by A to permit B to enter upon A’s land or to use his premises for some purpose is in effect an authority which prevents B from being regarded as a trespasser when he avails himself of the licence (Thomas v Sorrell)... Suppose one buys a theatre or sport ticket, ‘the ticket entitles the purchaser to enter and, if he behaves himself, to remain on the premises until the end of the event which he has paid his money to witness.

Lord Porter said the following.

It is one thing to say that a limited and temporal licence remains in force until the particular object for which it is given is fulfilled or the definite period of time has elapsed, it is quite a different matter to allege that a licence once given in general terms can never be terminated.

Lord Uthwatt said the following.

do what they can by an injunction to preserve the sanctity of a bargain. To my mind, as at present advised, a licensee who has refused to accept the wrongful repudiation of the bargain which is involved in an unauthorised revocation of the licence is as much entitled to the protection of an injunction as a licensee who has not received any notice of revocation.

Lord Macdermott said the following.

one who remains on the land of another after his licence to use it has terminated will not be considered a trespasser before he has had a reasonable time in which to vacate the premises… This period of grace can, of course, be the subject of agreement… ascribed to a rule of law rather than to an implied stipulation.’ ...the conclusion I reach is that in this contract there should be implied a stipulation to the effect that, after the expiration of the first year, the licence might be terminated by the licensors on the expiration of a reasonable notice period duly communicated to the licensees.

== Significance ==
Part II of the Landlord and Tenant Act 1954 provides business tenants with the guarantee of a new lease unless they expressly contracted out of its guarantees.

== Followed in ==
- In re Spenborough Urban District Council’s Agreement [1968] Ch 139;

== Applied in ==
- Verrall v Great Yarmouth BC [1981] EWCA
- Hounslow London Borough Council v Twickenham Garden Developments Ltd [1971] Ch 233;

== Distinguished in ==
- Ashburn Anstalt v Arnold [1989] EWCA

== See also ==
- English trusts law
- English land law
- English property law
