= Errington v Wood =

English contract law case

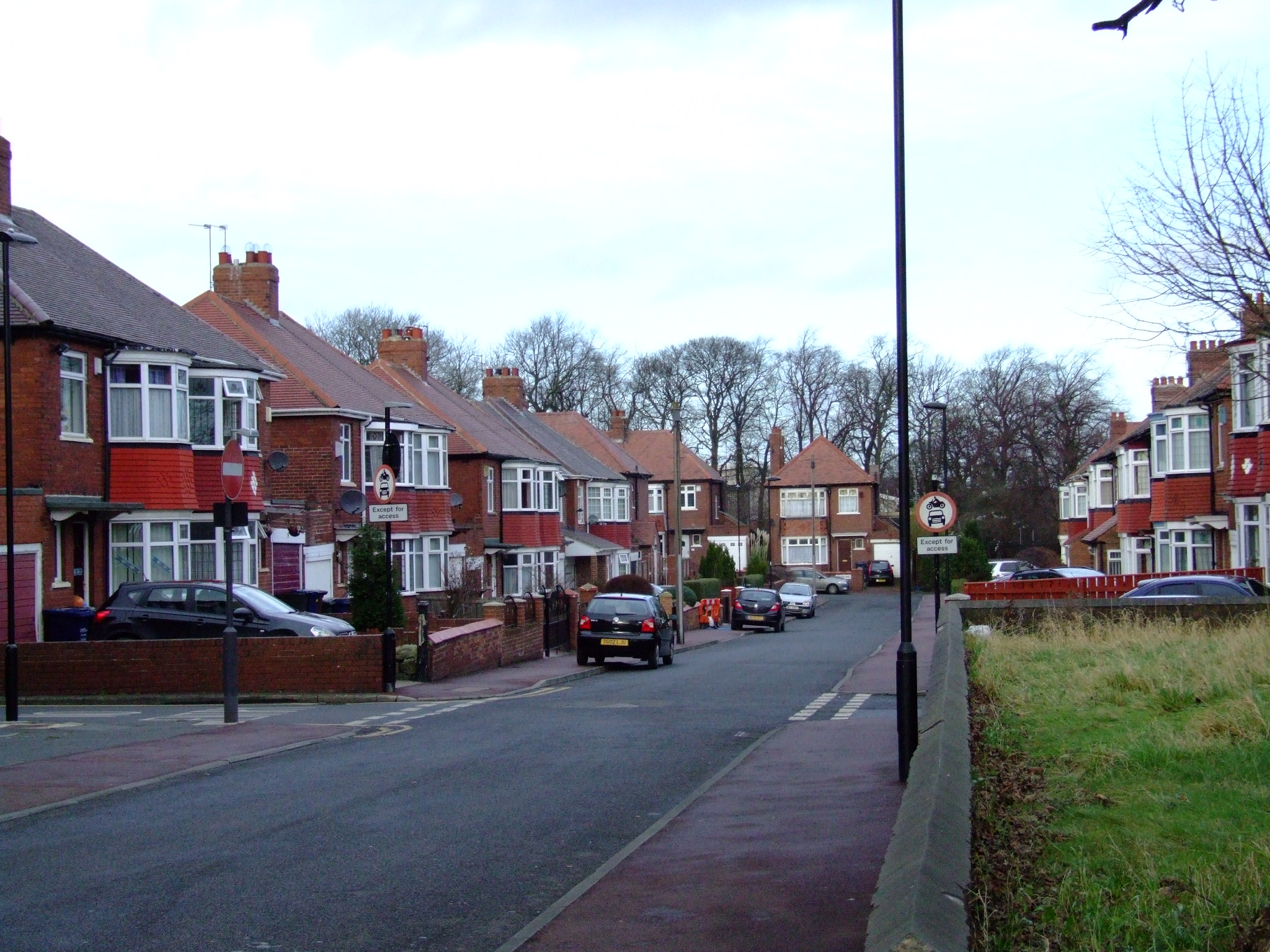
- Court: Court of Appeal of England and Wales
- Full case name: Also called Errington v Errington
- Citations: [1951] EWCA Civ 2, [1952] 1 KB 290

Case history
- Prior action: Claimant also lost at first instance.

Court membership
- Judges sitting: Somervell, Denning and Hodson LJ

Keywords
- Acceptance, unilateral offer

Mr. Errington bought a house for his son and daughter-in-law, paying £250 upfront and taking out a mortgage for the remaining £500. He promised them they could stay in the house as long as they paid the mortgage installments and that the house would be theirs once the mortgage was fully paid. When Mr. Errington died, his widow sought possession of the house from the daughter-in-law.

== Facts ==
Mr Errington in 1936 bought a house in Milvain Avenue, Newcastle upon Tyne, for his son and daughter in law, paying £250, and the remaining £500 coming from a mortgage, paid off with 15s a week by the newly weds. Mr Errington promised them they could stay in occupation as long as they paid the mortgage and that when all the instalments were paid it would be theirs. He gave her the building society book and said, ‘Don't part with this book. The house will be your property when the mortgage is paid.’ He died and the son left to move in with his mother. The mother sought possession from the daughter in law.

The judge dismissed the claim for possession.

== Judgment ==
The three-judge panel in the Court of Appeal unanimously held that the daughter in law did not have to move out of the house, because she was entitled to stay and pay off the mortgage as part of a binding agreement with the father, for varying reasons.

Somervell LJ gave the initial (first read) judgment of the panel.

Denning LJ held this was no mere tenancy at will; the father could not have revoked his promise once the couple had begun performing the act of paying off the mortgage instalments. The promise would only cease to bind him if they left their part of the promise incomplete and unperformed. The 15s a week was not rent, they were not bound to pay it, the father could only refuse to transfer them the house. The couple were licensees, but they acquired an equitable right to remain as long as they paid instalments, which would mature into a good equitable title once the mortgage was paid. The father made a unilateral contract, which could not be revoked once they began performance, but would cease to bind him if they did not perform their side. Although they had exclusive possession, they were licensees because they only have a mere personal privilege to remain, with no right to assign or sub let. But they were not bare licensees, rather than contractual licensees. He said there was no need to imply an obligation to complete the payments. The limit is where the daughter stops paying, and the father’s estate has to pick up the bill. Then she would lose her right to stay. The couple were on a licence, short of a tenancy but a contractual, or at least equitable right to remain, which would grow into good equitable title as soon as the mortgage was paid. The rule that a licence could always be revoked at will was ‘altered owing to the interposition of equity.’ His judgment continued:

What is the result in law of these facts? The relationship of the parties is open to three possible legal constructions:

(i) That the couple were tenants at will paying no rent. That is what the judge thought they were. He said that, in Lynes v. Snaith, 1899 1 Q.B., page 486, the defendant "was in exclusive possession and was therefore not a mere licensee but in the position of a tenant at will".

But in my opinion it is of the essence of a tenancy at will that it would be determinable by either party on demand, and it is quite clear that the relationship of these parties was not so determinable. The father could not eject the couple as long as they paid the instalments regularly to the Building Society. It was therefore not a tenancy at will. I confess that I am glad to reach this result: because it would appear that, if the couple were held to be tenants at will, the father's title would be defeated after the lapse of 13 years, long before the couple paid off the instalments, which would be quite contrary to the justice of the case.

(ii) That the couple were tenants at a rent of 15s. 0d. a week, such rent being for convenience paid direct to the Building Society instead of the father, and the tenancy being either a weekly tenancy or a tenancy for the duration of the mortgage repayments. But I do not think that 15s. 0d. can possibly be regarded as rent, for the simple reason that the couple were not bound to pay it. If they did not pay it, the father could not sue for it or distrain for it. He could only refuse to transfer the house to them. If the 15s. 0d. was not rent, then it affords no ground for inferring a tenancy.

(iii) That the couple were licensees, having a permissive occupation short of a tenancy, but with a contractual right, or at any rate, an equitable right to remain so long as they paid the instalments, which would grow into a good equitable title to the house itself as soon as the mortgage was paid. This is, I think, the right view of the relationship of the parties. I will explain how I arrive at it.

The classic definition of a licence was propounded by Chief Justice Vaughan in the seventeenth century in Thomas v Morrall (1673) Vaughan at page 351:

"A dispensation or a licence properly passes no interest or alters or transfers property in anything but only makes an action lawful without which it had been unlawful".

The difference between a tenancy and a licence is, therefore, that, in a tenancy, an interest passes in the land, whereas, in a licence, it does not. In distinguishing between them, a crucial test has sometimes been supposed to be whether the occupier has exclusive possession or not. If he was let into exclusive possession, he was said to be a tenant, albeit only a tenant at will, see Doe v. Chamberlayne (1839) 5 M. & W. 14, 16, Lynes v Snaith, 1899 1 Q.B., page 486: whereas if he had not exclusive possession he was only a licensee, Peakin v Peakin, 1895 2 I.R., page 359.

This test has however often given rise to misgivings because it may not correspond to realities. A good instance is Howard v Shaw, (1841) 8 M. & W., page 118, where a person was left into exclusive possession under a contract for purchase. Baron Alderson said that he was a tenant at will; and Baron Parke with some difficulty agreed with him, but Lord Abinger said that:

"while the defendant occupied under a valid contract for the sale of the property to him, he could not be considered as a tenant".

Now, after the lapse of a hundred years, it has become clear that the view of Lord Abinger was right. The test of exclusive possession is by no means decisive.

The first case to show this was Becker v Palmer, 1942 A.E.R., page 674, where an owner gave some evacuees permission to stay in a cottage for the duration of the war, rent free. This Court held that the evacuees were not tenants, but only licensees. The Master of the Rolls, Lord Greene, said (at page 677):

"To suggest there is an intention to create a relationship of landlord and tenant seems to me to be quite impossible. There is one golden rule which of general application, namely, that the law does not impute an intention to enter into legal relationships when the circumstances and the conduct of the parties negative any intention of the kind".

Those emphatic words have had their effect.

We have had many instances lately of occupiers in exclusive possession who have been held to be not tenants, but only licensees. When a requisitioning authority allowed people into possession at a weekly rent, Minister of Health v Bellotti, 1944 K. B., page 298, Southgate Borough Council v Watson, 1944 K.B., page 541, Ministry of Agriculture v Matthews, 1950, 1 K.B., 148: when a landlord told a tenant on his retirement that he could live in a cottage rent free for the rest of his days, Foster v Robinson, 1951 1 K.B., 149, 156, when a landlord, on the death of the widow of a statutory tenant, allowed her daughter to remain in possession paying rent for six months, Marcroft Vagons Ltd. v. Smith, 1951 2 K.B., page 496 when the owner of a shop allowed the manager to live in a flat above the shop, but did not require him to do so, and the value of the flat was taken into account at £1 a week in fixing his wages, Webb Ltd. v. Webb, 24th October 1951 (not yet reported): in each of these cases the occupier was held to be a licensee and not a tenant.

Likewise there are numerous cases where a wife, who has been deserted by her husband and left by him in the matrimonial home, has been held to be, not a tenant of the husband owner, Bramwell v Bramwell, 1942 1 K.B., page 370, Pargeter v Pargeter, 1946 1 A.E.R., page 250, nor a bare licensee, Oldgate Estate v Alexander, 1950 1 K.B., page 311, but to be in a special position – a licensee with a special right – under which the husband cannot turn her out except by an order of the Court, Middleton v Baldeck, 1951 1 K.B., page 657.

The result of all these cases is that, although a person who is let into exclusive possession is prima facie to be considered to be a tenant, nevertheless he will not be held to be so if the circumstances negative any intention to create a tenancy. Words alone may not suffice. Parties cannot turn a tenancy into a licence merely by calling it one. But if the circumstances and the conduct of the parties show that all that was intended was that the occupier should be granted a personal privilege, with no interest in the land, he will be held only to be a licensee.

In view of these recent cases I doubt whether Lynes v Snaith, 1899 1 Q.B., page 486, and the case of the gamekeeper referred to therein would be decided the same way to-day.

Applying the foregoing principles to the present case, it seems to me that, although the couple had exclusive possession of the house, there was already no relationship of landlord and tenant. They were not tenants at will but licensees. They had a mere personal privilege to remain there, with no right to assign or sub-let. They were, however, not bare licensees. They were licensees with a contractual right to remain. As such they have no right at law to remain, but only in equity, and equitable rights now prevail.

I confess, however, that it has taken the Courts some time to reach this position. At common law a licence was always revocable at will, notwithstanding a contract to the contrary, Wood v Leadbitter (1845) 13 M. & W., page 838. The remedy for a breach of the contract was only in damages. That was the view generally held until a few years ago, see for instance what was said in Booker v Palmer, 1942 A.E.R., 674, 677, Thompson v Park, 1944 K.B., 408, 410. The rule has however been altered owing to this interposition of equity.

Law and equity have been fused for nearly 80 years, and since 1948 it has become clear that, as a result of the fusion, a licensor will not be permitted to eject a licensee in breach of a contract to allow him to remain, see Winter Garden Theatre v Millenium, 1946 1 A.E.I., at page 680 per Lord Greene, 1948 A.C. at page 191 per Lord Simon: nor in breach of a promise on which the licensee has acted, even though he gave no value for it, see Foster v Robinson, 1951 K.B., page 149 at page 156, where the Master of the Rolls, Sir Raymond Evershed, said that as a result of the oral arrangement to let the men stay, he "was entitled as licensee to occupy the premises without charge for the rest of his days". This infusion of equity means that contractual licences now have a force and validity of their own and cannot be revoked in breach of the contract. Neither the licensor nor anyone who claims through him can disregard the contract except a purchaser for value without notice.

I ought perhaps to mention two cases which appear at first sight to revert to the former view: The first is Rogers v Hyde, 1951 2 K.B., page 923, where a landlord promised that a sharing arrangement (which was really a licence) should "be within the Rent Acts". It was held by this Court that the licensee was not protected: because the Rent Acts operate only on tenancies, and that, just as parties could not contract out of the Acts, so they could not contract into them. No argument was put forward that the landlord's promise was equivalent to saying: "I promise to give you, my licensee, the same protection as the Rent Acts give to tenants". If that argument had been put forward, the very point might have arisen which arises in this case; but, as it happened, the point was not taken, so there was no decision on it.

The other case is Thompson v Earthy, 1951 2 K.B., page 596, where a husband, for good consideration, gave an undertaking that he would allow his wife and children to remain in his house rent free. It was held that the husband was entitled to defeat his promise by selling the house over her head, even though the purchaser took with full knowledge of the promise. I notice however that, in coming to this decision, Mr Justice Roxburgh emphasised that the wife was not a licensee, basing himself on something I said in Oldgate Estates v Alexander, 1950 1 K.B. 311, 319: but the later decision of this Court in Foster v Robinson, 1951 1 K.B., 149, 154, shows that she was a licensee and that the husband could not have ejected her in breach of his promise. I cannot help thinking that, if that case had been cited to the learned judge, the decision might have been different. I see nothing, therefore, in these recent cases to shake the view I have expressed about contractual licences.

In the present case it is clear that the father expressly promised the couple that the property should belong to them as soon as the mortgage was paid, and impliedly promised that so long as they paid the instalments to the Building Society, they should be allowed to remain in possession. They were not purchasers because they never bound themselves to pay the instalments, but nevertheless they were in a position analogous to purchasers. They have acted on the promise and neither the father nor his widow, his successor in title, can eject them in disregard of it.

The result is that in my opinion the appeal should be dismissed and no order for possession should be made. I come to this conclusion on a different ground from that reached by the learned Judge, but it is always open to a respondent to support the judgment on any ground.

Hodson LJ gave a short concurring judgment.

== See also ==
- English contract law
  - Carlill v Carbolic Smoke Ball Co
- English land law

Intention to create legal relations
