= Kling v Keston Properties =

English land law case

Kling v Keston Properties Ltd
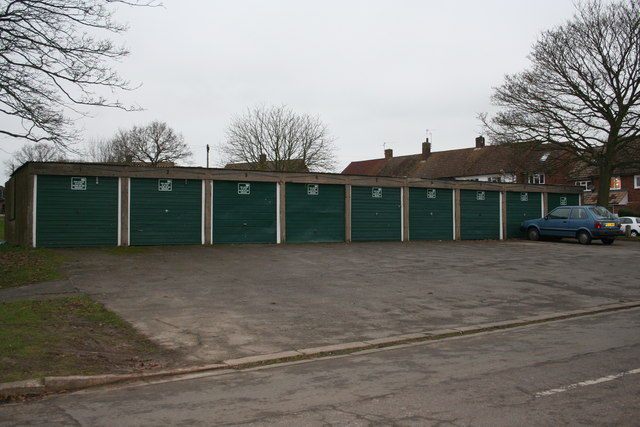
- A typical row of (domestic) garages
- Court: High Court, Chancery Division
- Decided: 1985
- Citation: (1985) 49 P & CR 212

Case history
- Prior action: none
- Subsequent action: none

Court membership
- Judge sitting: Vinelott J

Keywords
- Garage; parking as actual occupation; overriding interest (binding against third parties); unregistered proprietary right (long lease) to park/occupy; Land Registration Act 1925 s59 70(1)(g) (repealed, replaced in 2002, effective 2003)

Kling v Keston Properties Ltd (1985) is an English land law case, concerning actual occupation in registered land, specifically domestic garages.

== Facts ==
Kling was first just a licensee of the garage (in Chelsea). He had and then exercised a right of pre-emption to take a long lease of it from the licensor (land owner). He parked his car in the garage routinely. It was almost always kept there overnight and for most of the day.

The new owner of Keston's interest did not know of Kling's parking and noted that he had not registered his lease promptly at the Land Registry, nor registered a priority "search" against their title warning that a new lease was to be pending.

The legal question was whether parking amounted to occupation.

== Judgment ==
The Judge held that the parking of the car in the lock-up garage could amount to actual occupation for the purpose of an overriding interest. His overriding interest derived from his proprietary right in the leasing the garage and remaining a lawful licensee.

The plaintiff had and exercised a right of pre-emption entitling him to take a long lease of a garage. He was at the time also licensee of the garage.

The use of the garage amounted to actual occupation, thereby protecting the right as an overriding interest as regards the garage. His right was protected under section 70(1). The court rejected a submission based on section 59 of the Act.

== Cases applied, followed ==
Bridges v Mees [1957] Ch 475 EWHC: an overriding interest, namely an estate contract, was protected under s. 70(1) of the Act even though it could have been protected by a caution.

Webb v Pollmount Ltd [1966] Ch 584 EWHC: an option to purchase the reversion contained in a seven-year lease was protected under s. 70(1) by virtue of the tenant’s occupation under the lease.

== Significance ==
The case has been superseded, strengthening its proposition, by statute. Such lawful, actual occupation is officially an overriding proprietary interest under the Land Registration Act 2002, Schedule 3. The Act took effect from 13 October 2003. The case confirms the law has evolved to take into account such uses as cars/motorbikes kept in domestic garages as "occupation".

== Approved by ==
Ashburn Anstalt v Arnold [1988] EWCA Civ 14

== See also ==
- English land law
- English property law
