= Aslan v Murphy =

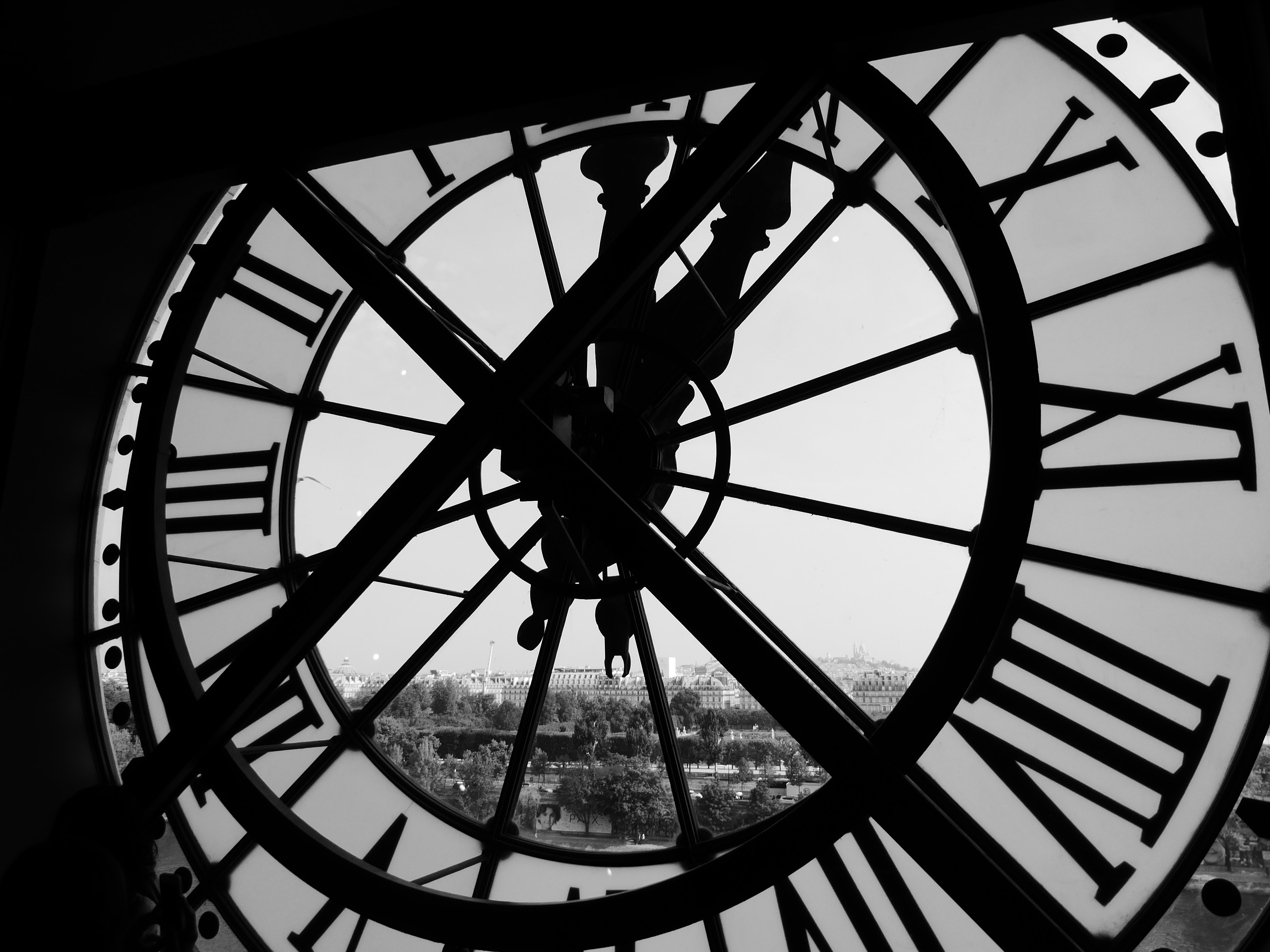
- Court: Court of Appeal
- Full case name: Aslan v Murphy or Duke v Wynne
- Citations: [1989] EWCA Civ 2, [1990] 1 WLR 766

Keywords
- Lease

Aslan v Murphy and Duke v Wynn [1989] EWCA Civ 2 is an English land law case deciding whether an occupier was a tenant or, instead, a lodger.

The case confirmed the anti-avoidance principles which apply to interpreting whether a habitation arrangement is a lease or a licence (to occupy). A 22 1/2 hours-per-day "licence" was held to be a lease; with exclusive possession of room, with a lock. The judgment expressed an intention-based test where the live-in landlord acts as the keyholder, giving examples as to where exclusive possession is not being denied as part of the living arrangements by the landlord retaining the keys.

== Facts ==
An agreement provided the “licensee” could use the room only between midnight and 10.30am and noon and midnight.

== Judgment ==
Lord Donaldson MR held that this provision was a pretence and not part of the “true bargain”.

This identification and exposure of such pretences does not necessarily lead to the conclusion that their agreement is a sham, but only to the conclusion that the terms of the true bargain are not wholly the same as that of the bargain appearing on the face of the agreement...

It is the true rather than the apparent bargain which determines the question: tenant or lodger?

...it is not a requirement of a [lease] that the occupier shall have exclusive possession of the keys to the property. What matters is what underlies the provision as to keys. Why does the owner want a key, want to prevent keys being issued to the friends of the occupier or want to prevent the lock being changed?

== Cases cited ==
=== Followed ===
- Street v Mountford [1985] UKHL 4

== See also ==
- English land law
- English trusts law
- English property law
