= London and Blenheim Estates Ltd v Ladbroke Retail Parks Ltd =

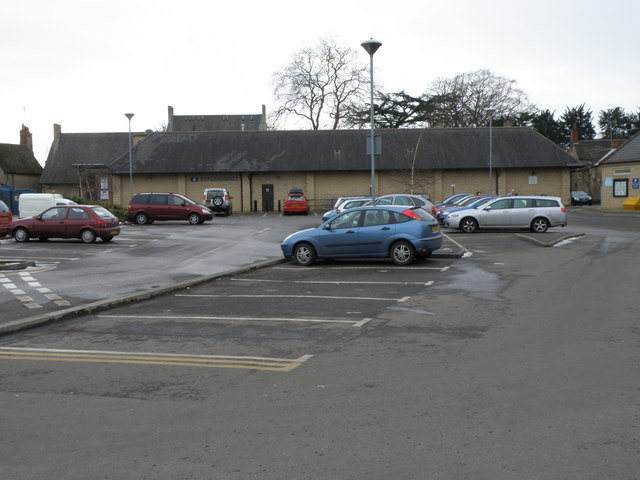
- Court: Court of Appeal
- Decided: 5 and 25 May 1993
- Citations: [1993] 4 All ER 157 [1994] 1 WLR 31

Case history
- Prior action: appellent also failed in the High Court.
- Subsequent action: none

Court membership
- Judges sitting: henry Gibson LJ; Beldam LJ; Peter Gibson LJ

Case opinions
- Held: L&B could not claim a car parking right for its additional land it had come by, because such an alleged dominant tenement was not adequately identified. The reason why there must be a dominant tenement before there can be a grant is because certainty is of prime importance.

Keywords
- Reservation of easement car parking absence of applicable rights of third parties before the Contracts (Rights of Third Parties) Act 1999

London and Blenheim Estates Ltd v Ladbroke Retail Parks Ltd [1993] 4 All ER 157 is an English land law case, concerning easements. It persuasively confirmed for one of the first times, obiter, that parking a car on land on its own could be the appropriate subject matter for an express easement. It established that an arrangement for a future extension of easement rights over specific other land would require a specific parcel of dominant land too. Simply agreeing that wherever any dominant land is extended (to an incertain extent) the easement on the servient land will be extended (even to a certain degree) is insufficient.

== Facts ==
The Leicestershire branch of the Co-op sold part of its land to London and Blenheim ("L&B") but reserving the right to park cars on the land (i.e. reserving of rights by the Co-op). The agreement provided that if L&B were to acquire "more land" or words to that effect, it should tell the Co-op in advance so Co-op could benefit from more parking rights on a pre-agreed basis.

Then the Co-op sold its land to Ladbroke.

L&B argued it could serve notice on Ladbroke in place of Co-op (and attempted to do so), L&B having acquired new land; secondly it denied it now owned further servient land to accommodate Ladbroke's claimed interests under the contract with Co-op. In its view Ladbroke did not have a further easement (rights to bind L&B to grant more parking) and could not have an easement in the first place. Ladbroke countered that even L&B were bound by the agreement as it expressly created easements; the fact that its future enhanced parking rights related to uncertain land (therefore in specie) was not an invalid concept in law.

== Judgment ==
=== High Court ===
Judge Paul Baker QC held the following.

The essential question is one of degree. If the right granted in relation to the area over which it is to be exercisable is such that it would leave the servient owner without any reasonable use of his land, whether for parking or anything else, it could not be an easement though it might be some larger or different grant.

=== Court of Appeal ===
Peter Gibson LJ gave the leading judgment, he agreed that L&B could not claim a car parking right for additional land, because the alleged dominant tenement was not adequately identified. The reason why there must be a dominant tenement before there can be a grant is because certainty is of prime importance, as said in Ashburn Anstalt v Arnold, a case which concerned a proposed expensive new development in South Kensington.

A right intended as an easement and attached to a servient tenement before the dominant tenement is identified would in my view be an incident of a novel kind.

== See also ==
- English land law
- English trusts law
- English property law
