= Christopher Slade =

British judge (1927–2022)

The Right Honourable Sir Christopher Slade
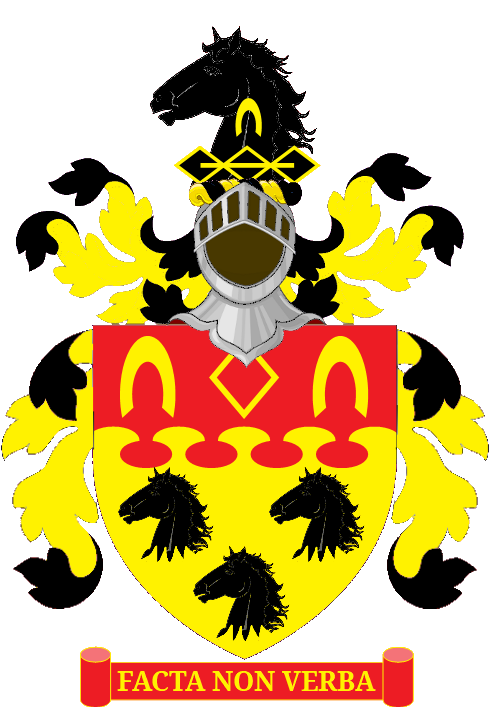
- Lord Justice Slade's coat of arms

Lord Justice of Appeal
- In office 1982–1991
- Monarch: Elizabeth II

Justice of the High Court
- In office 1975–1982

Personal details
- Born: Christopher John Slade; 2 June 1927 Pimlico, London, England
- Died: 7 February 2022 (aged 94) Fulham, London, England
- Spouse: Jane Buckley
- Education: New College, Oxford
- Occupation: Judge
- Profession: Barrister

Sir Christopher John Slade (2 June 1927 – 7 February 2022) was a British judge who served as a Lord Justice of Appeal of England and Wales from 1982 to 1991.

== Life and career ==
Christopher John Slade was born in Pimlico, London, England on 2 June 1927. The eldest son of George Penkivil Slade KC (a kinsman of Sir Benjamin Slade, although not in remainder to the baronetcy) and Mary Carnegie, he had two younger brothers, Julian (the composer) and Adrian (President of the Liberal Party), as well as a sister, Pauline (who married David Hamilton-Russell, a grandson of the 8th Viscount Boyne).

He was educated at Eton before going up to New College, Oxford, where he was awarded the Eldon Scholarship. Taking silk in 1965, he served as Master of the Ironmongers' Company (for 1973/74), before being sworn of the Privy Council in 1982.

Married in 1958 to Jane Buckley, daughter of the Rt Hon. Sir Denys Buckley MBE, Sir Christopher and Lady Slade had four children, Lucinda now Tite (born 1959), Victoria now Henderson-Cleland (born 1962), Richard (born 1963) and Amelia now Jackson (born 1966).

Slade died at home in Fulham, London, on 7 February 2022, aged 94.

== Judicial decisions ==
Important judicial decisions of Lord Justice Slade include:

- Re Bond Worth Ltd
- Reckitt & Colman Products Ltd v Borden Inc
- Adams v Cape Industries plc
- Street v Mountford
- Bank of Credit and Commerce International SA v Aboody
- Rolled Steel Products (Holdings) Ltd v British Steel Corp
- Phillips Products Ltd v Hyland and Hamstead Plant Hire Co Ltd
- Aveling Barford Ltd v Perion Ltd
- Mikeover Ltd v Brady
- Powell v McFarlane
- Winkworth v Christie Manson and Woods Ltd
