= Phillips Products Ltd v Hyland and Hamstead Plant Hire Co Ltd =

English legal case concerning unfair contract terms

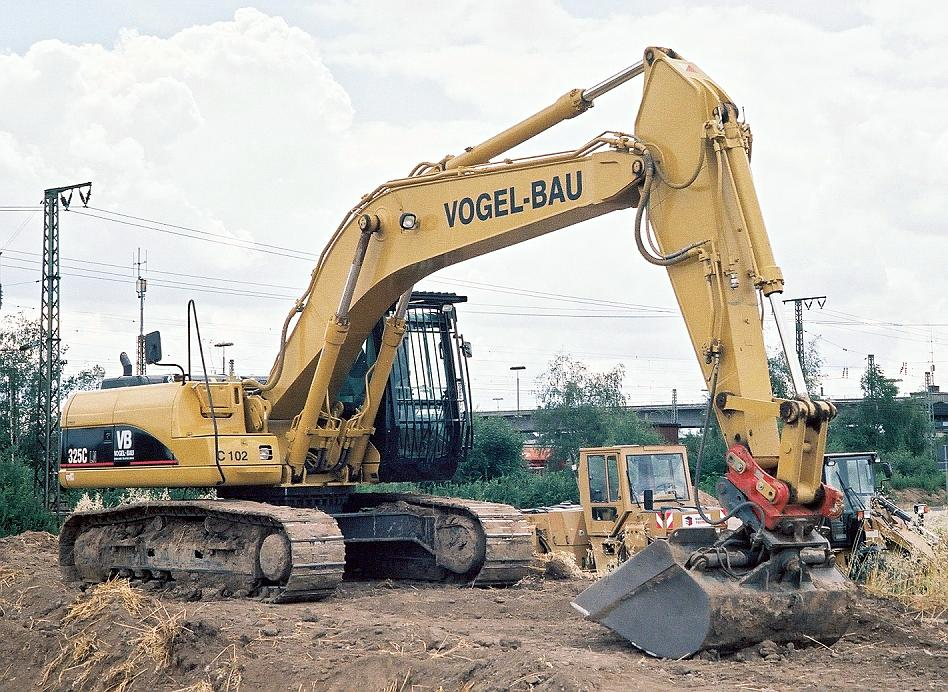
- Court: Court of Appeal
- Citations: [1984] EWCA Civ 5, [1987] 2 All ER 620

Case opinions
- Slade LJ

Keywords
- Unfair terms

Phillips Products Ltd v Hyland and Hamstead Plant Hire Co Ltd [1984] EWCA Civ 5 is an English contract law case concerning the Unfair Contract Terms Act 1977.

== Facts ==
Hamstead Plant Hire hired out a JCB excavator to Phillips Products. It also hired out a driver, Mr Hyland. Condition 8 of their contract stated the driver would be deemed to be the employee of Phillips Products. The driver crashed into Phillips’ factory wall. Phillips argued that Hamstead Plant Hire should pay for the damage caused by Mr Hyland, because condition 8 was caught by UCTA 1977 section 2(2) and was unreasonable. Hamstead Plant Hire argued it was not, asserting there had been no negligence on its part that was even being excluded, because there was no ‘breach’ of obligation in section 1(1)(b). The effect of condition 8, they contended, was that no liability for the driver had ever been assumed.

== Judgment ==
Slade LJ rejected Hamstead Plant Hire’s argument. Condition 8 was caught by UCTA 1977, and was unreasonable in excluding its liability for Mr Hyland's damage. When deciding what breach there is, the court should not include the exclusion clause in deciding whether a breach existed. Read with section 13(1), section 2 encompasses ‘terms and notices which exclude or restrict the relevant obligation or duty’, so section 2 clearly extends to duty defining, not just duty excluding clauses. Condition 8 failed the reasonableness test under section 11 and Schedule 2, because the claimants’ hire was for a short period, there was little opportunity for arranging insurance and no choice over the driver. Hamstead Plant Hire Co were in the best position to take out insurance.

== See also ==
- English contract law
- Thompson v T Lohan (Plant Hire) Ltd [1987] 2 All ER 631
