= Winkworth v Christie Manson and Woods Ltd =

1980 English High Court case

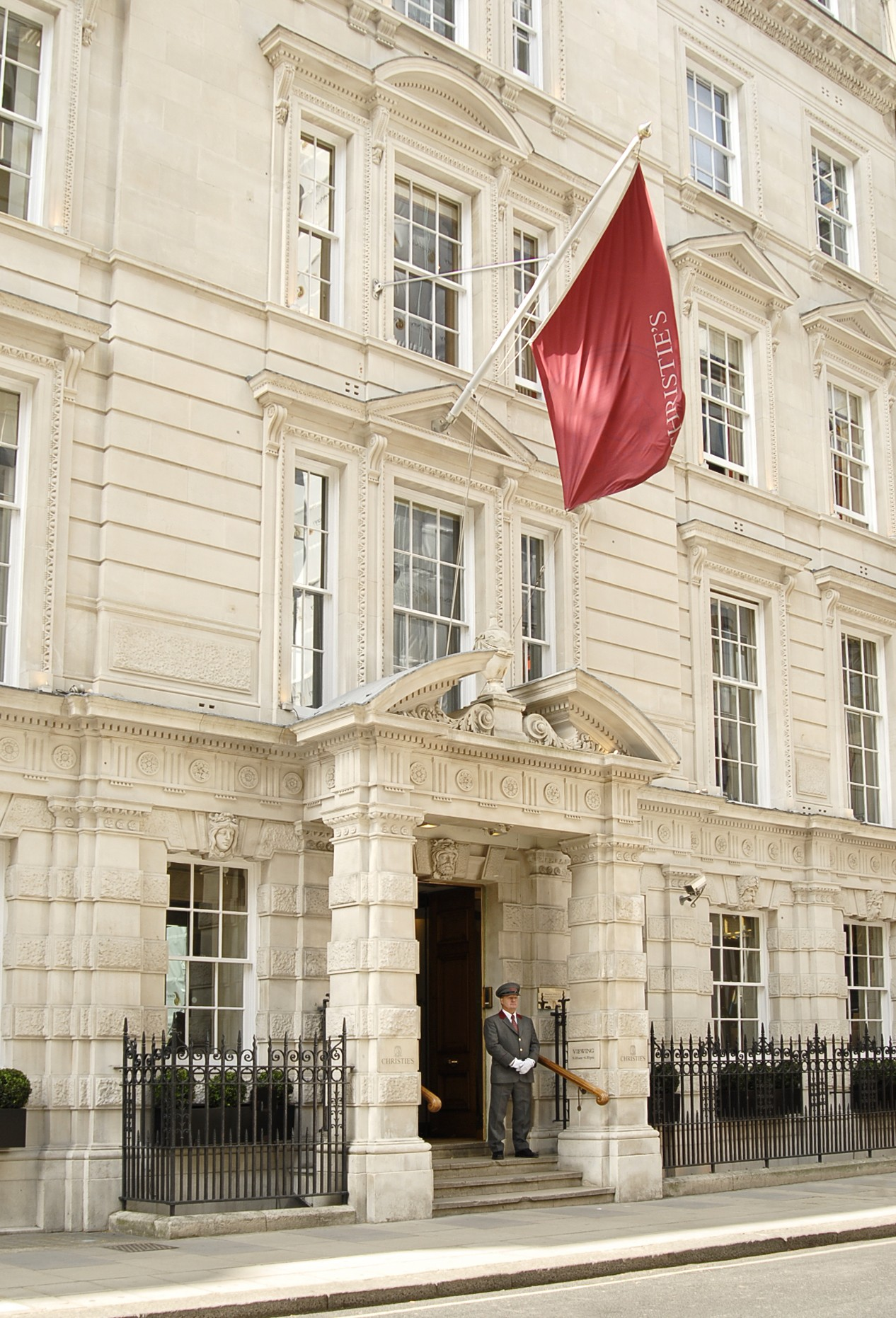
- Christie's, King Street, London
- Court: High Court
- Full case name: Winkworth v Christie Manson and Woods Ltd and Another
- Decided: 5 November 1979
- Citations: [1980] 1 Ch 496 [1980] 1 All ER 1121

Court membership
- Judge sitting: Slade J

Keywords
- conflict of laws; lex situs; personal property; conveyance

Winkworth v Christie Manson and Woods Ltd [1980] 1 Ch 496 was a judicial decision of English High Court relating to the proper law to determine whether title passes when stolen goods are sold to another person in a foreign country.

The case related to paintings which were stolen in England, and later sold by the thief to a purchaser in good faith who was unaware that they were stolen in Italy. Slade J held that the rule as to whether or not title to property validly passed was to be determined by the law of the place where the property was located at the time that the transfer purportedly took place. In this case, under Italian law a purchaser in good faith without notice received good title, and accordingly, the rule of Italian law prevailed over the English rule (known as the nemo dat rule) because that was where the paintings were at the relevant time.

== Facts ==
The facts of the case were not complex, and were set out in the judgment:

The goods with which the action and counterclaim are concerned ("the goods"), were stolen in England from the lawful possession of the plaintiff who was the owner of them at the time of the theft and was domiciled in England and Wales. They were subsequently taken to Italy and sold and delivered by a third party to the second defendant under a contract made in Italy, and as to the contractual rights of the parties governed by Italian law, the goods also being at the time of such sale and delivery, physically situate in Italy.

The goods were thereafter delivered by the second defendant to Christie's in London for sale there by auction by Christie's on his behalf. Some of the goods were sold in England by Christie's on his behalf, but before the proceeds of sale were paid over by them to the second defendant or the balance of the goods were sold, the plaintiff asked for a received undertakings from Christie's not to part with the proceeds of sale and not to part with the possession of the balance of the goods then remaining unsold pending determination of the issues between the plaintiff and the second defendant. The plaintiff neither knew of or nor consented to the removal of the goods to Italy or any subsequent dealings with or movements of them up to the time when the said undertakings were given.

The case was heard by way of determination of a preliminary issue, and the certified point for determination was:

Whether upon the basis of the agreed facts set forth in the schedule ... English domestic law or Italian domestic law is to be applied to the issue whether the plaintiff or the [second] defendant ... has title to the goods with which this action and the said counterclaim are concerned and to the proceeds of sale of those goods ...

The pleaded claims were for detinue and conversion. Slade J noted that if the issues were to be determined under English law, then the plaintiff would likely succeed, as under English law title can never pass to a thief. However, if Italian law was to be applied, then the second defendant would win because under Italian law "a purchaser of movables acquires a good title notwithstanding any defect in the seller's title or in that of prior transferors provided that (1) the purchaser is in good faith at the time of delivery, ... (3) the purchaser is not aware of any unlawful origin of the goods".

== Judgment ==
Slade J noted that the editors of Dicey & Morris, The Conflict of Laws (9th ed., 1973) stated that the validity of a transfer was determined by the place of the goods at the time of the transfer. But, he noted, this was subject to five specific exceptions, including where the location of the goods was "unknown", where the foreign law was repugnant to public policy, or where the transfer is not in good faith. However, none of the exceptions were pleaded or relied upon.

He noted that the general rule has been accepted since Cammell v Sewell (1858) 3 H&N 617 (aff'd (1860) 5 H&N 728). He also referred to the rule being upheld in Re Anziani [1930] 1 Ch 407 and quoted Devlin J in Bank Voor Handel en Scheepvaart NV v Slatford [1953] 1 QB 248 at 257 stating: "There is little doubt that it is the lex situs which as a general rule governs the transfer of movables when effected contractually."

Counsel for the plaintiffs, John Mummery, acknowledged these cases but sought to distinguish them as being inapplicable to a case of clear theft so closely connected to England as the lex fori. He also pointed out it is accepted that for English law property may have different locations (legally speaking) for different purposes. Slade J expressed himself to be attracted by the argument, but that it was devoid of authority. Accordingly, the plaintiff was thrown back on trying to show that Italian law should be disapplied as a matter of public policy. However, there was no authority for that proposition and, the case being by way of preliminary issue, there was no evidence as to the precise effect of Italian law beyond the second defendant's pleaded case. The Court referred to American authorities which suggested that "the law of a state into which chattels have been surreptitiously removed without the knowledge of an owner and against his will does not apply its law to divest the title of the absent owner", as well as the US case of Edgerly v Bush (1880) 81 NY 199.

On balance the court upheld the general rule, and approved as authoritative the statement in Cheshire & North's Private International Law (10th ed., 1979):

... the proprietary effect of a particular assignment of movables is governed exclusively by the law of the country where they are situated at the time of the assignment. An owner will be divested of his title to movables if they are taken to a foreign country and there assigned in circumstances sufficient by the local law to pass a valid title to the assignee. The title recognised by the foreign lex situs overrides earlier and inconsistent titles no matter by what law they may have been created.

== Commentary ==
The case has been universally accepted as correctly applying the law, and is cited as authoritative by all of the major texts on the English conflict of laws including, unsurprisingly, the ones referred to in the judgment itself.

The decision has been cited with approval in numerous subsequent judicial decisions, including Glencore v MTI [2000] EWHC 199 (Comm), [2001] 1 Lloyd's Rep 284 and Macmillan Inc v Bishopsgate Investment Trust plc (No 3) [1995] EWCA Civ 55, [1996] WLR 387.
