= Michael Fox (judge) =

British barrister and judge (1921–2007)

Sir Michael John Fox (8 October 1921 – 9 April 2007) was a British barrister and judge. He was a High Court judge from 1975 to 1981 and a Lord Justice of Appeal from 1981 until 1992.

== Early life and education ==
Fox's parents were Catholics, his father from Dublin and his mother from Killarney. By the time of Michael's birth, they had moved to Hanwell, West London. His father was an administrator in a railway company. Michael was the youngest of four siblings. In 1930, an older brother died in a shooting accident, and his father died a month later. He attended Drayton Manor School, Hanwell.

He later enrolled in the London School of Economics (LSE) to read law, but his studies were interrupted by the war. His poor eyesight prevented him from joining the armed forces during the Second World War, and worked in intelligence in the Admiralty from 1942 to 1945.

Instead of continuing at the LSE, he applied to read jurisprudence at Magdalen College, Oxford, after the war, gaining a second-class degree in 1947 and then the Bachelor of Civil Law in 1948. He was called to the bar at Lincoln's Inn in 1949. He joined the chambers of Cyril Radcliffe at 3 New Square, as a pupil of John Sparrow (later Warden of All Souls College, Oxford).

He practised as a Chancery barrister, dealing with tax, trusts, wills and real estate. He became a Queen's Counsel in 1968, and became head of his chambers in 1972.

He married fellow barrister Hazel Stuart, stepdaughter of Lord Denning, in 1954; later, as Lady Hazel Fox QC, she was director of the British Institute of International and Comparative Law from 1982-89 and is Honorary Follow of Somerville College, Oxford. They had three sons and a daughter together. He took early retirement in 1992 as a result of his failing eyesight, and he spent much time at Nuthanger Farm, near Watership Down, Hampshire.

== Death ==
Diagnosed with Alzheimer's disease in his later years, he died in 2007, and was survived by his wife and their four children.

== Judicial career ==
He was appointed as a High Court judge in 1975, receiving the customary knighthood and becoming a Bencher at Lincoln's Inn. He was allocated to the Chancery Division, where he was involved in various high-profile cases. He refused an injunction to stop the Coventry Free Festival, held in Stoneleigh in Warwickshire, accepting undertakings to restrict the sound output and limit its opening hours; he granted an injunction to stop a clergyman from holding services at his church after he had been dismissed; and he granted Ladybird Books an injunction to stop David Sullivan publishing a "hardcore" pornographic magazine under the name "Ladybirds". He refused Bali Bras' request for permission to register their brand as a trade mark, as it would be confused with Berlei Bras.

He was promoted to the Court of Appeal in 1981 and, as is customary, was sworn of the Privy Council. In 1984, he upheld the appeal by Victoria Gillick, that children should not be given contraceptives without their parents' consent, except in an emergency or with the permission of the court, [1985] 1 All ER 533. This judgment was narrowly overturned by a 3–2 majority on appeal to the House of Lords, [1986] AC 112. Also in 1984, he granted an injunction to stop The Daily Mirror from publishing information from bugged telephone conversations of National Hunt jockey John Francome, [1984] 2 All ER 408.

In 1985, he ordered the Metropolitan Police to give documents relating to the death of Blair Peach, a teacher killed in London in April 1979 during a demonstration by the Anti-Nazi League against a National Front election meeting, to his family, who were suing the police, [1986] 2 All ER 129. In 1988, he ruled that Doreen Hill, mother of Jacqueline Hill, the last murder victim of the "Yorkshire Ripper", Peter Sutcliffe, was not entitled to damages from West Yorkshire police, on the grounds that the police did not owe a duty of care to the victims of criminals that they failed to catch, even if they were negligent, [1987] 1 All ER 1173. This decision was upheld by the House of Lords, [1988] 2 All ER 238.

In 1990, he upheld the rulings that The Independent and The Sunday Times were in contempt of court for publishing extracts from Peter Wright's book Spycatcher, breaching court orders made against other newspapers, but fines of £50,000 were quashed. This decision was upheld by the House of Lords. Also, in 1990, he rejected an appeal by "Miss Whiplash", Lindi St Clair, holding that her income from prostitution was subject to income tax as "profits from trade". Fox delivered leading judgments in several significant English trust and property law cases. In Ashburn Anstalt v Arnold (1989) Ch 1, the Court of Appeal examined the distinction between leases and licenses, including whether contractual rights arising from license may bind a subsequent purchaser of the property.In Agip (Africa) Ltd v Jackson Ch 547, Fox considered third-party liability for knowingly assisting a breach of trust, an issue subsequently examined in academic legal commentary.

== Judicial decisions ==
Key judgments which Lord Justice Fox delivered during his career included:

- Burns v Burns [1984] Ch 317
- Ashburn Anstalt v Arnold [1989] Ch 1
- Re Duke of Norfolk's Settlement Trusts [1982] Ch 61
- Thompson v T Lohan (Plant Hire) Ltd [1987] 2 All ER 631
- Agip (Africa) Ltd v Jackson [1991] Ch 547

== Arms ==
Coat of arms of Michael Fox

Motto
Vive Hodie
