= Aveling Barford Ltd v Perion Ltd =

UK company law case concerning reduction of capital

- Court: High Court
- Citation: [1989] BCLC 626

Keywords
- Reduction of capital

Aveling Barford Ltd v Perion Ltd [1989] BCLC 626 is an English company law case concerning reduction of capital. It held that a sale at an undervalue of an asset was a dressed-up distribution. As the company did not have distributable reserves, the sale was in consequence an unlawful reduction of capital.

The law in relation to the transfer of assets at an undervalue has been clarified in CA 2006, and the amount of the distribution arising in consequence of a sale at undervalue is now determined in accordance with section 845.

== Facts ==
Mr Lee owned and controlled both Aveling Barford Ltd and Perion Ltd. Aveling Barford owned a country house and 18 acres of land in Grantham, which it sold to Perion £350,000, rather than the £1,150,000 it had been valued for prospective mortgagees. Aveling Barford subsequently went into liquidation, and the liquidator sued to have Perion be declared a constructive trustee of the proceeds realised by Perion on the resale of the property.

== Judgment ==
Hoffmann J held that it was a breach of the directors' fiduciary duty to sell the property at an undervalue. Given the relationship between the parties, the sale at an undervalue represented a distribution, and as the sale amounted to an unlawful reduction of capital, it was incapable of ratification. The transferee was therefore accountable as a constructive trustee. ‘This was a dressed up distribution’, it was ultra vires and incapable of ratification.

The rule that capital may not be returned to shareholders is a rule for the protection of creditors and the evasion of the rule falls within what I think Slade LJ had in mind when he spoke of fraud on creditors.

== See also ==
- UK company law
- CA 2006 s 845
- Progress Property Co Ltd v Moorgarth Group Ltd [2010] UKSC 55
