= Hazel Fox =

British lawyer (1928–2025)

- Born: Hazel Mary Stuart; 22 October 1928; Pyin Oo Lwin, Burma
- Died: 12 July 2025 (aged 96)
- Education: Somerville College, Oxford
- Occupations: Writer, lawyer
- Known for: Expert and writer on "state immunity"
- Spouse: Sir Michael Fox (died 2007)
- Children: 4
- Relatives: Lord Denning (step-father)

Hazel Mary Fox CMG KC (born Hazel Mary Stuart; 22 October 1928 – 12 July 2025), often known as Lady Fox, was a British international lawyer and an expert in State Immunity. She was involved in a number of British high profile cases where individuals had legal disputes with governments.

== Life and career ==
Fox was born in what is now called Pyin Oo Lwin in Mandalay in what was then Burma. She was head girl at Roedean School and went to Somerville College, Oxford to study modern languages. She switched to jurisprudence and graduated with a first in 1949.

In 1954 she married after a delay while they established some financial security. Her husband was Michael Fox, another lawyer and later judge.

As a lawyer she was an expert in "state immunity" and she advised on cases of torture and other circumstances where someone became an alleged victim of the acts of a nation. She has pointed out that in some circumstances it is not possible to take an official to court where the law considers that he or she was acting on behalf of the state.

She was involved in a high profile case involving Sulaiman Al-Adsani in 1996. He had leave to sue the Kuwaiti government concerning his torture. It was alleged that he had been accused of distributing a sex tape involving a sheikh, and that as a result he was held under water and burned as torture by the Emir of Kuwait, Jaber Al-Ahmad Al-Sabah. The case was raised in the British government noting that threats had been made by the Kuwaiti ambassador against Sulaiman Al-Adsani's life. The case failed because of a defense of diplomatic immunity.

In 2002 she published "The Law of State Immunity".

She was made a Companion of the Order of St Michael and St George in 2006. Her husband died in the following year. They had four children Matthew, Patrick, Jane and Charles. Lady Fox was also Honorary Fellow and Law Fellow of Somerville College, Oxford.

=== Death and legacy ===
Fox died on 12 July 2025, at the age of 96, and was survived by nine grandchildren. Her book "The Law of State Immunity" has been revised and updated. It was updated by Professor Phillipa Webb again in 2013.

== Publications ==
- International Arbitration: law and procedure, 1959 (as co-author)
- International Law and Developing States Vol I (1988) and vol.II (1990) (as Editor)
- An Introduction to International Economic Law, 1992
- Joint Development of Offshore Oil and Gas: A Model Agreement for States for Joint Development with Explanatory Commentary', Vol I (1989), vol.II (1990)
- 'Institut de Droit international, as Rapporteur on the 3rd Committee on International Crimes and Jurisdiction of States and their Agents, 2009
- Law of State Immunity (1st edn 2002, 2nd edn 2008 and 2013)
