= Re Duke of Norfolk's Settlement Trusts =

English legal case about trustees

Re Duke of Norfolk’s Settlement Trusts
- Court: Court of Appeal
- Citation: [1982] Ch 61, [1981] 3 All ER 220

Keywords
- Trustee remuneration

Re Duke of Norfolk’s Settlement Trusts [1982] Ch 61 is an English trusts law case, which confirmed that a court has the inherent jurisdiction to remunerate a trustee.

== Facts ==
The Schroder Executor & Trustee Co Ltd had a fee scale set under their trust instrument to administer the Duke of Norfolk's settlement trust (after the death of Bernard Fitzalan-Howard, 16th Duke of Norfolk). The trustees claimed an extra £25,000 in fees for exceptional and unforeseen work involved in a central London property redevelopment scheme, and similar work surrounding the Capital Transfer Tax 1975 introduction and also to revise the fee scale for the future.

At first instance, Walton J granted the first claim, but not the second two.

== Judgment ==
Fox LJ, overturning Walton J, confirmed that the court had the inherent jurisdiction, not only to authorise payment of trustees where none had been made by the settlor, but also to increase it. He said,

the court has an inherent jurisdiction to authorise the payment of remuneration of trustees and that that jurisdiction extends to increasing the remuneration authorised by the trust instrument. In exercising that jurisdiction the court has to balance two influences which are to some extent in conflict. The first is that the office of trustee is, as such, gratuitous; the court will accordingly be careful to protect the interests of the beneficiaries against claims by the trustees. The second is that it is of great importance to the beneficiaries that the trust should be well administered. If therefore the court concludes, having regard to the nature of the trust, the experience and skill of a particular trustee and to the amounts which he seeks to charge when compared with what other trustees might require to be paid for their services and to all the other circumstances of the case, that it would be in the interests of the beneficiaries to increase the remuneration, then the court may properly do so.

Brightman LJ and Cumming-Bruce LJ concurred.

== See also ==
- Boardman v Phipps [1966] UKHL 2
- Broughton v Broughton (1855) 5 De GM&G 160, 164, Lord Cranworth LC
- Turner v Hancock (1882) 20 ChD 303, 305, per Sir George Jessel MR
- Re Worthington [1954] 1 WLR 526, the power to pay money should be exercised sparingly, given it is money not going to the beneficiaries
- Foster v Spencer [1996] 2 All ER 672, the question of whether a trustee should get money for work already done framed in terms of whether the beneficiaries had been ‘unjustly enriched’ if they would not pay. Trustees do not normally get interest on incurred, 678, ‘ordinary costs and expenses accrued in a piecemeal fashion’.
- Malcolm v O'Callaghan (1835) 3 Myl & Cr 52, trustee claimed for several trips to Paris to attend court hearings, since they were not concerned with the trust as it related to English law.
- Robinson v Pett (1734) 3 P Wms 249, 251, Lord Talbot LC said the reason for the default no allowance position ‘seems to be… if allowed, the trust estate might be loaded, and rendered of little value. Besides, the great difficulty there might be in settling the quantum of such allowance, especially as one man’s time may be more valuable than that of another; and there can be no hardship in this respect upon any trustee, who may choose whether he will accept the trust, or not.’
- Guinness plc v Saunders [1990] 2 AC 663, Lord Goff held a Boardman v Phipps type quantum meruit can be made only ‘where it cannot have the effect of encouraging trustees in any way to put themselves in a position where their interests conflict with their duties as trustees.’
