= Thompson v T Lohan (Plant Hire) Ltd =

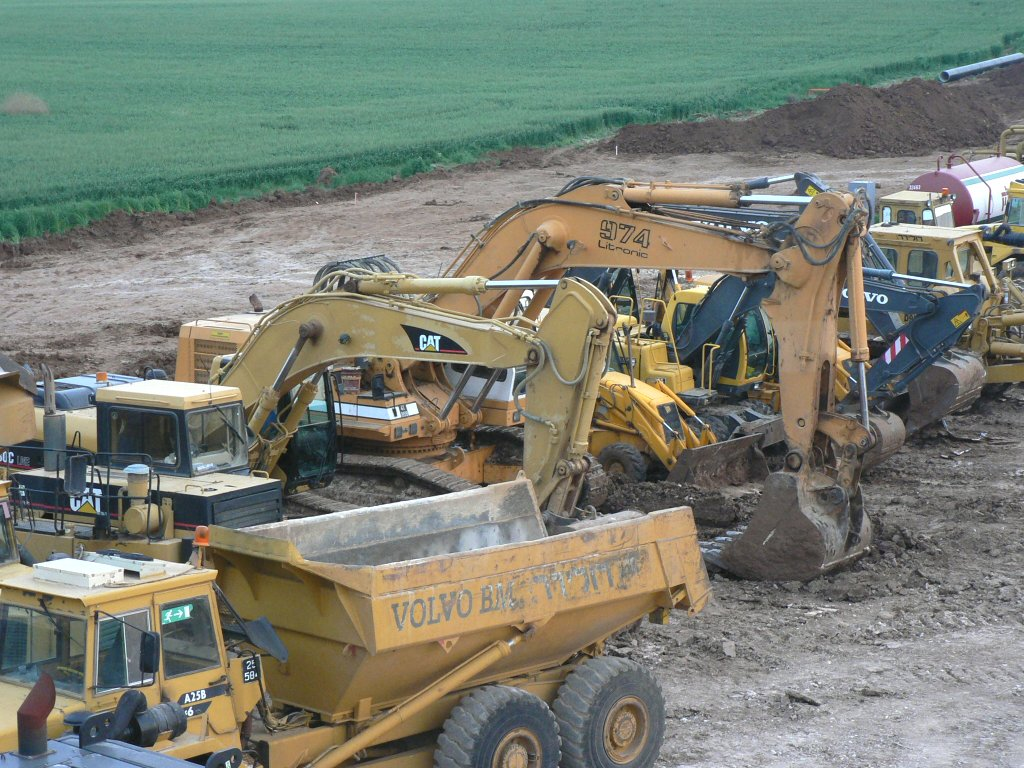
- Court: Court of Appeal
- Citation: [1987] 2 All ER 631

Court membership
- Judge sitting: Fox LJ

Keywords
- Unfair terms

Thompson v T Lohan (Plant Hire) Ltd [1987] 2 All ER 631 is an English contract law case on the Unfair Contract Terms Act 1977.

It is usually read with Phillips Products Ltd v Hyland and Hamstead Plant Hire Co Ltd where a similar contract clause (an older version of the same standard industry term) was held to be unreasonable, but where the liability being shifted had the effect of leaving a victim of loss without a remedy. In Thompson there was no exclusion of liability to the victim of the accident.

== Facts ==
T Lohan hired out a JCB excavator and driver, Mr Hill, to JW Hurdiss Ltd, the owners of a quarry. Condition 8 of the contract said the driver was employed by JW Hurdiss Ltd. The driver caused Mr Thompson’s death. Mrs Thompson got damages from T Lohan for her husband's life. T Lohan sought to recover the cost of compensation from JW Hurdiss Ltd. JW Hurdiss argued that condition 8 was caught by UCTA 1977 section 2(1).

== Judgment ==
Fox LJ held that condition 8 was not caught by UCTA 1977 and was effective to transfer liability to the hirers. Section 2(1) had no effect because liability was not excluded towards the victim of the negligent act, Mr Thompson. It only excluded liability towards T Lohan themselves. It transferred liability. This distinguished the case from Phillips Products Ltd v Hyland and Hamstead Plant Hire Co Ltd. So there is a distinction between an exclusion and transfer of liability. In particular he noted the following.

In my opinion, section 2(1) is concerned with protecting the victim of negligence and, of course, those who claim under him. It is not concerned with arrangements made by the wrongdoer with other persons as to the sharing or bearing of the burden of compensating the victim. In such a case it seems to me there is no exclusion or restriction of the liability at all.

== See also ==
- English contract law
