= Ashburn Anstalt v Arnold =

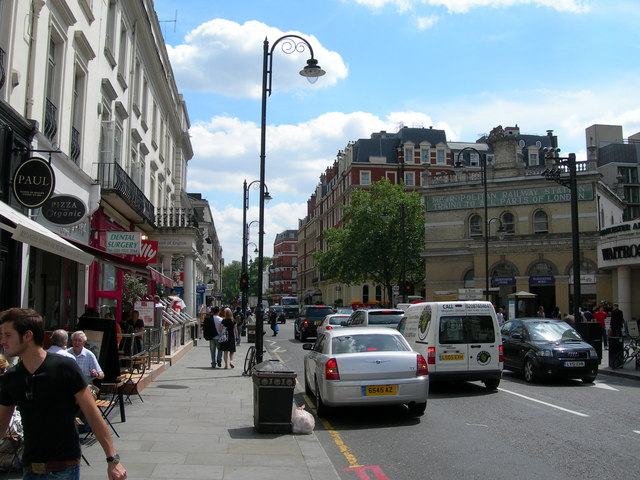
- Gloucester Road, London
- Court: Court of Appeal of England and Wales
- Full case name: Ashburn Anstalt v Walter John Arnold and WJ Arnold & Company Limited
- Decided: 25 February 1988
- Citations: [1988] EWCA Civ 14, [1989] Ch 1

Court membership
- Judges sitting: Fox LJ, Neill LJ, Bingham LJ

Keywords
- Lease, licence, tenancy

Ashburn Anstalt v Arnold [1988] EWCA Civ 14 is an English land law case decided by the Court of Appeal. It establishes that in English law rent is not required for the creation of a tenancy. However its judgement on the requirements on certainty of duration of a lease has been discredited by Prudential Assurance Co v London Residuary Body .

== Facts ==
Arnold & Co had a lease of some business premises at 126 Gloucester Road, Kensington, London. It sold the lease to Matlodge Ltd subject to a promise the old lessee could remain for free in occupation as ‘licensees’ until any redevelopment on a quarter's notice in writing, and that on redevelopment that they should get a lease of a shop in a prime position at the development with 1000 square metres and car parking. Then Cavendish Land Co Ltd acquired both the freehold and the lease, accepting the contractual duties to Arnold & Co. Then Cavendish was taken over by Legal & General Assurance Society Ltd, which accepted the contract. Then L&G sold its freehold to Ashburn Anstalt, which also took the freehold ‘subject to’ the Arnold & Co contract. It had no redevelopment plans but sought possession anyway.

Arnold & Co argued that its interest bound Ashburn Anstalt, as: 1. it was a lease, and thus an overriding interest under LRA 1925 section 70; 2. if it was just a licence, it should bind anyway, under Errington v Errington or be a constructive trust.

Evans-Lombe QC sitting as judge in the High Court held the agreement created only a licence but that licence bound Ashburn Anstalt, and possession was refused.

== Judgment ==
Fox LJ held that Arnold & Co were considered to be occupying on a lease which bound the new landlord. Rent was not necessary to create a tenancy, the occupation agreement was certain enough, and it was thus an overriding interest, as they were in actual occupation, even though it was not registered as an estate contract, applying Street v Mountford. If they had only had a contractual licence, Arnold & Co could not have asserted its right against Ashburn Anstalt. Any suggestion in Errington v Wood that a licence creates an interest in land was wrong, according to Thomas v Sorrell. A mere contractual licence could not bind as a constructive trust without there being an express promise. It was uncertain whether a rent was necessary for having a tenancy, relying on Street v Mountford, however Radaich was held to be the authoritative definition, and that did not include any mention of a rent. There would only be a constructive trust, continued Fox LJ, if,

... it is satisfied that the conscience of the estate owner is affected… The fact that the conveyance is expressed to be subject to the contract may often, for the reasons indicated by Dillon J, be at least as consistent with an intention merely to protect the grantor against claims by the grantee as an intention to impose an obligation on the grantee. The words ‘subject to’ will, of course, impose notice. But notice is not enough…

We do not think it desirable that constructive trusts of land should be imposed in reliance on inferences from slender materials. In our opinion the available evidence in the present case is insufficient.

… it seems to us highly unlikely that it would have relied upon such vague words as ‘subject to’ without the addition of an express obligation… we would have expected a clearly expressed obligation… we see no indication in the 1973 agreement that [A] was concerned with the protection of [B]…

In general, we should emphasise that it is important not to lose sight of the question: ‘Whose conscience are we considering?’ It is [C’s], and the issue is whether [C] has acted in such a way that, as a matter of justice, a trust must be imposed. For the reasons which we have indicated, we are not satisfied that it should be.

Neill LJ and Bingham LJ concurred.

== See also ==
- English land law
