= Verrall v Great Yarmouth BC =

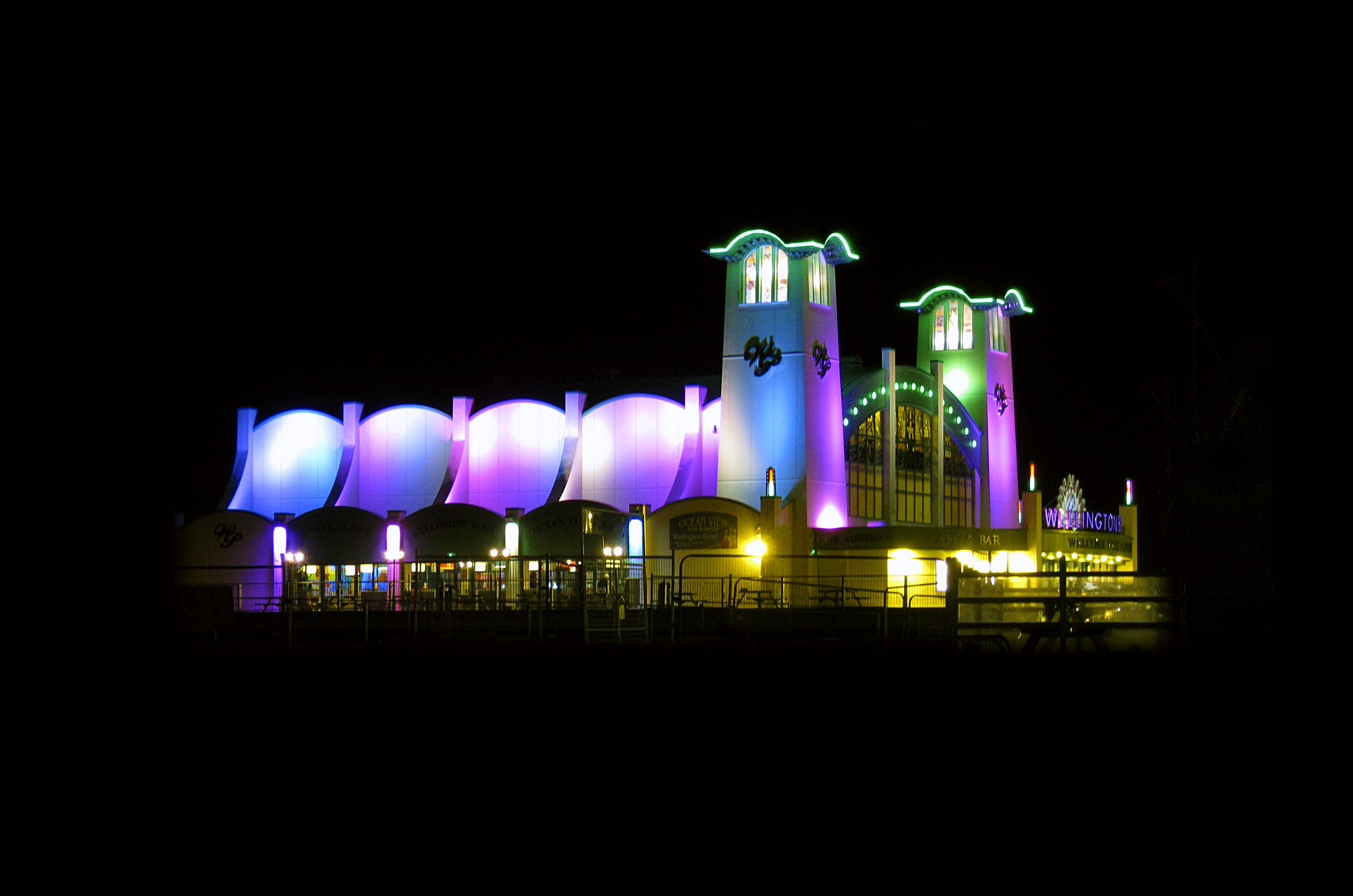
- Wellington Pier, Yarmouth
- Court: Court of Appeal
- Full case name: Richard Verrall v Great Yarmouth Borough Council
- Decided: October 10, 11 and 18, 1979
- Citations: [1981] QB 202 [1980] 3 WLR 258 [1980] 1 All ER 839

Case history
- Prior action: Appellant also lost at High Court.
- Subsequent action: none

Court membership
- Judges sitting: Watkins J Lord Denning M.R. Roskill LJ; Cumming-Bruce LJ

Keywords
- Licence relating to property, future event licence for consideration, revocation in breach, unjustified breach, party politics, specific performance

Verrall v Great Yarmouth BC [1981] QB 202 is a land and contract law case on the arbitrary revocation of an agreed, future licence in land for good consideration.

It also determined whether the remedy of specific performance was available to the claimant, who succeeded in the action and as respondent against the Council's appeal or whether damages would be a more appropriate remedy. It decided that ordering specific performance was appropriate.

== Facts ==
Great Yarmouth Borough Council agreed to rent out the Wellington Pier Pavilion in April 1979 to the National Front for its two-day national conference in October. Then Labour won the balance of control on the council in May insisting the new administration revoke the NF's licence. Verrall, the party's deputy chairman, sued on his own behalf and for the NF members for performance of the contract.

== Judgment ==
Lord Denning MR held that the contract had to be upheld, and was specifically enforceable. Since the case of Winter Garden Theatre Ltd v Millennium Ltd he said, ‘it is clear that once a man has entered under his contract of licence, he cannot be turned out. An injunction can be obtained against the licensor to prevent his being turned out.’

Supposing one of the great political parties - say, the Conservative Party - had booked its hall at Brighton for its conference in September of this year: it had made all its arrangements accordingly: it had all its delegates coming: it had booked its hotels, and so on. Would it be open to the local council to repudiate that agreement, and say that the Conservative Party could not go there? Would the only remedy be damages? Clearly not… It would be the same in the case of the Labour Party, or whoever it may be. When arrangements are made for a licence of this kind of such importance and magnitude affecting many people, the licensors cannot be allowed to repudiate it and simply pay damages.

== Cases applied ==
- Winter Garden Theatre (London) Ltd v Millennium Productions Ltd [1948] AC 173, UKHL (E)

== Cases distinguished ==
- Thompson v Park [1944] KB 408, CA

== See also ==
- English property law
- English contract law
