= Thompson v Park =

English law case, concerning licenses in land

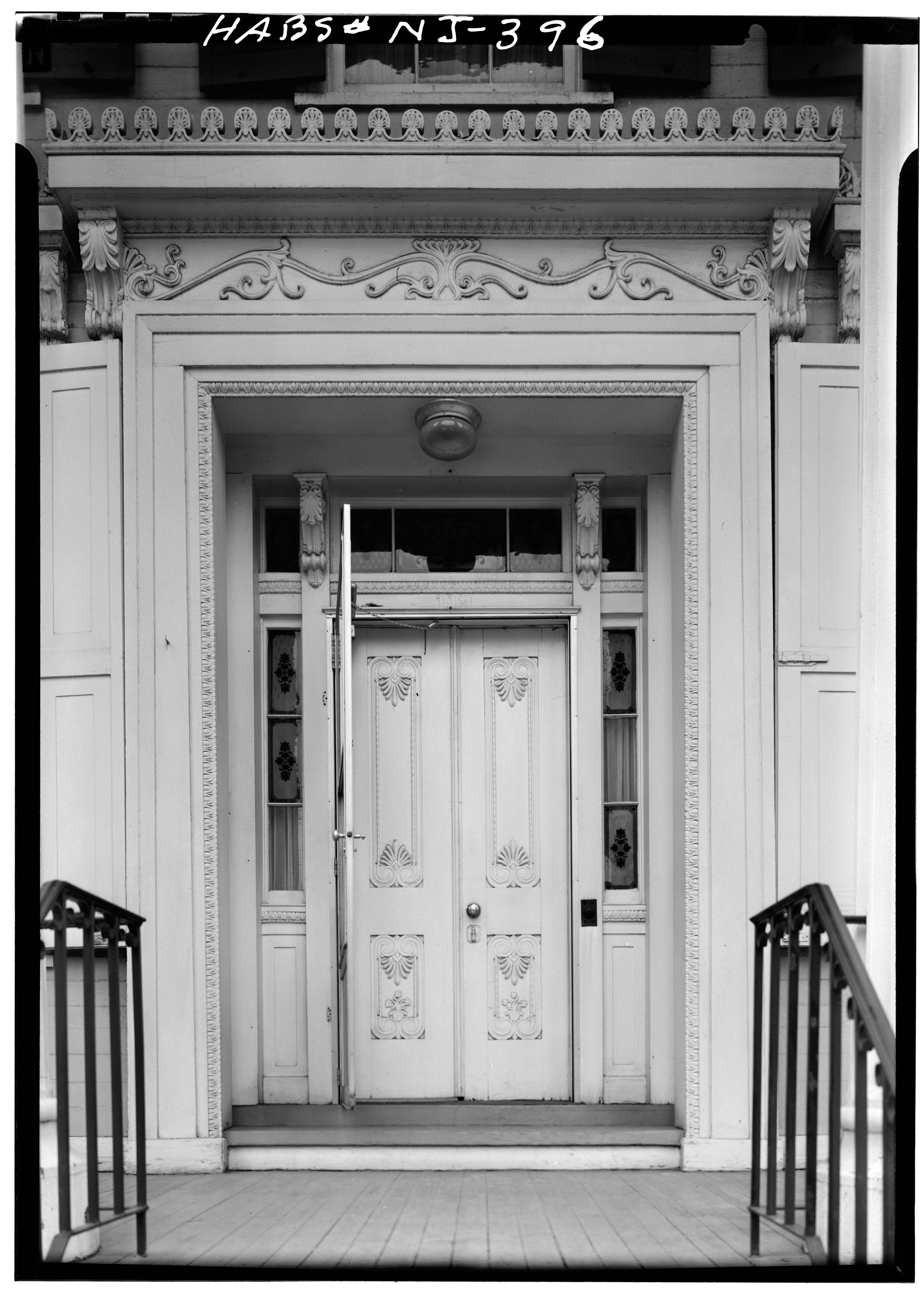
- Court: Court of Appeal
- Decided: 28 February 1944
- Citation: [1944] KB 408

Keywords
- Licence; revoked; possible breach of joint venture contract; whether forcible re-entry trespass; whether re-entry proper for right to sue for damages in a non-commercial, school context

Thompson v Park [1944] KB 408 is an English law case, concerning licenses in land.

== Facts ==
Mr. Thompson, the school's headmaster, wanted an injunction for Mr. Park to leave his school, after Mr. Park had forced his way back into the premises which they had amalgamated as a joint venture together at Broughton Hall, Eccleshall, Staffordshire. Park had a class of 25 pupils before relations broke down, and Thompson had revoked the license. Park countered that he had been denied of his investment.

== Judgment ==
Goddard LJ granted the injunction because of the behavior Park demonstrated.

... the court cannot specifically enforce an agreement for two people to live peaceably under the same roof - yet, of course, if the contract is broken, [B] has got a common law remedy in damages, which, if he is right, might be heavy. [B], however did not seek the intervention of the court, but took the law into his own hands and remedied the grievances under which he felt he was suffering in a manner which seems to me to have been wholly deplorable, all the more so when one considers that he is in charge of small boys at a preparatory school and ought to be inculcating into them a respect for authority and discipline. It appears to me that on his own showing he has been guilty at least of riot, affray, wilful damage, forcible entry and, perhaps, conspiracy… The licensee, once his licence is withdrawn, has no right to re-enter on the land. If he does, he is a common trespasser.

== Not followed in ==
- Verrall v Great Yarmouth BC [1981] QB 202; EWCA

== Distinguished in ==
- Luganda v Service Hotels Ltd [1969] 2 Ch 209; EWCA

== See also ==
- English land law
- English tort law
