= AG Securities v Vaughan =

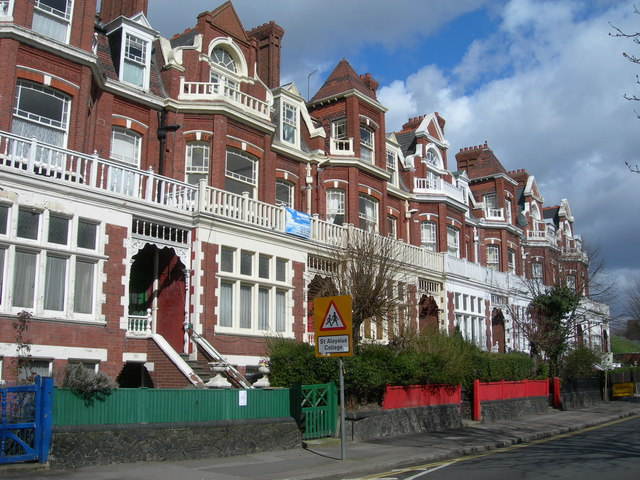
- Linden Mansions, Hornsey Lane
- Court: House of Lords
- Full case name: AG Securities v Vaughan; Antoniades v Villiers
- Citations: [1988] UKHL 8, [1990] 1 AC 417, [1988] 3 All ER 1058

Keywords
- Lease, licences

AG Securities v Vaughan and Antoniades v Villiers [1988] UKHL 8 were two House of Lords cases decided in the same ruling, which together clarified and confirmed as pivotal the role of exclusive possession in identifying what constitutes a lease (including a tenancy) for the purposes of English land law.

== Facts and prior Court of Appeal rulings ==
In the first case, AG Securities, an unlimited company, owned 25 Linden Mansions, Hornsey Lane, London: four bedrooms and communal areas (for the bedrooms' occupants). It rented (let) these to Nigel Vaughan and three others. Each moved in at different times from 1982, signing independent agreements. In May 1985 AG Securities terminated the agreements. They claimed they jointly held a tenancy (a lease) and therefore had statutory protection. The judge held there was no lease, this was a licence. The Court of Appeal held the reverse, but Sir George Waller dissented.

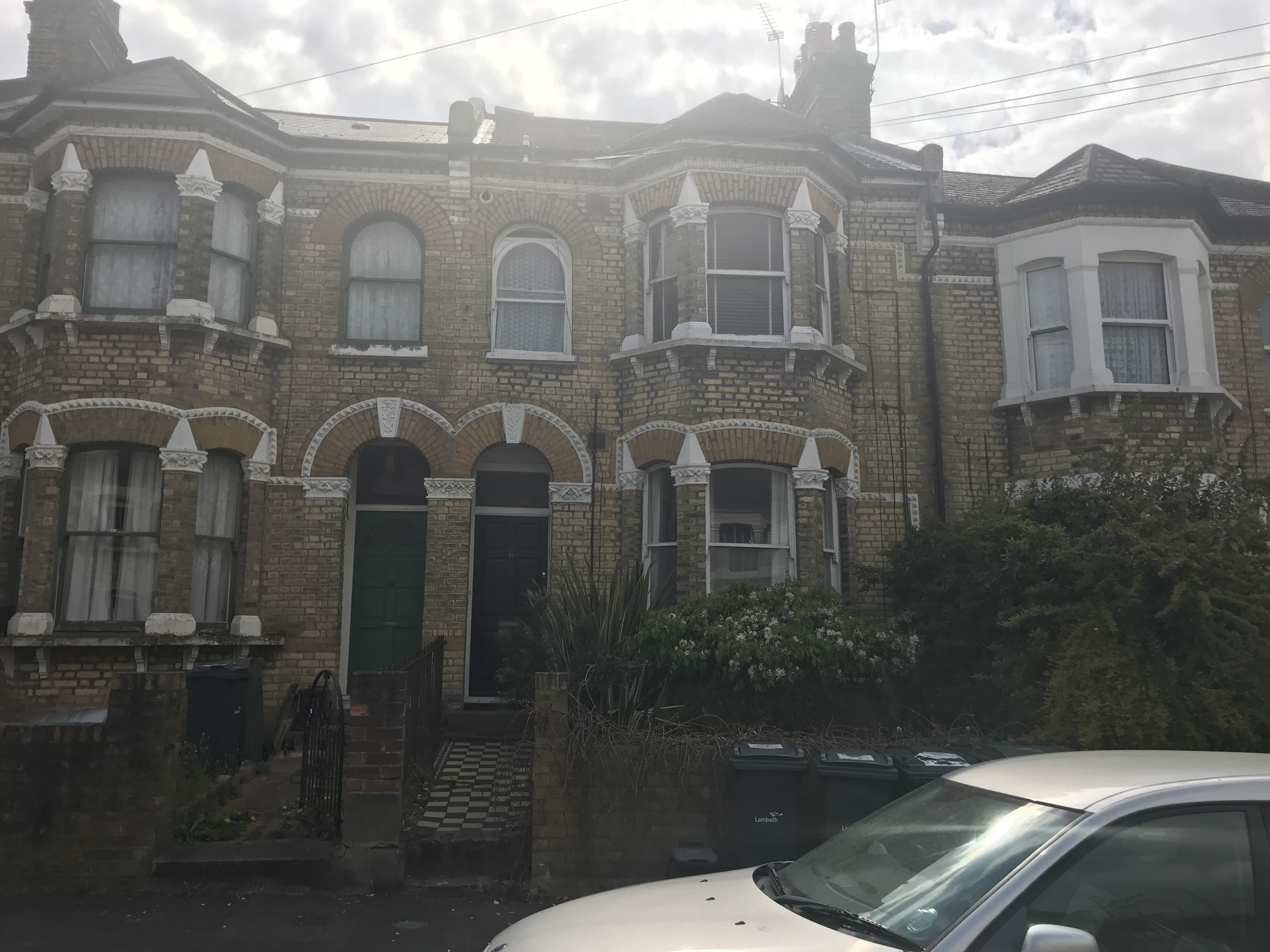
6 Whiteley Road, Upper Norwood, London

In the second case, Mr Antoniades owned 6 Whiteley Rd, Upper Norwood, London, with a bedroom, kitchen and bathroom, and rented it to Mr Villiers and Miss Bridger. They moved in together and signed identical agreements on 9 February 1985. These stated that the Rent Acts did not apply and that ‘the licensor is not willing to grant... exclusive possession’ and that the use of the flat was ‘in common with the licensor and such other licensees or invitees as he may permit from time to time’. Clause 16 said that other people could use the rooms. In 1986 Mr Antoniades claimed possession. Statute would limit the power to remove them. Judge held they did have a lease. The Court of Appeal held they were licensees.

These cases were appealed to the House of Lords.

== House of Lords ==
The House of Lords held that Mr Vaughan with his co-tenants were licensees only and not tenants, because none had exclusive possession and their rights could not be amalgamated to give a joint lease, while Mr Villiers and Ms Bridger did have exclusive possession of their room - albeit jointly - and therefore did have a lease, despite the wording of their agreements which identified them as having only a licence (to occupy).

In discussing these cases, Lord Templeman observed that tenants could be described as those people entitled to be protected with security of tenure and maximum rents since the Rent Act 1915, up to the Rent Act 1977. People could not contract out of such laws, which were intended to protect the vulnerable from harm and to prevent consent to substandard treatment by means of coercion, nor could they be avoided by choosing words that did not match the reality. If that were possible, then sham wordings would merely become the norm, and the protective intent of the law would be unachieved:

Parties to an agreement cannot contract out of the Rent Acts; if they were able to do so the Acts would be a dead letter because in a state of housing shortage a person seeking residential accommodation may agree to anything to obtain shelter... The duty of the court is to enforce the Acts and in so doing to observe one principle which is inherent in the Acts and has been long recognised, the principle that parties cannot contract out of the Acts…

== See also ==
- English property law
- Rent Act 1977
- Joint tenancy
- Street v Mountford [1985] AC 809
