= Street v Mountford =

English land law case from the House of Lords

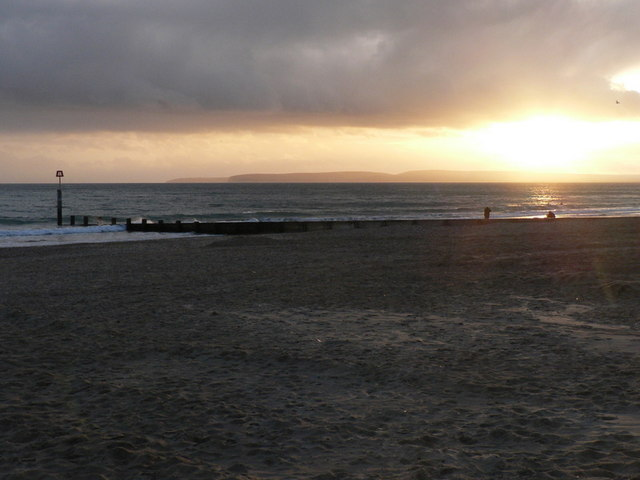
- Boscombe
- Court: House of Lords
- Full case name: Street v Mountford
- Decided: 2 May 1985
- Citations: [1985] UKHL 4, [1985] AC 809; [1985] 2 WLR 877

Court membership
- Judges sitting: Lord Scarman; Lord Keith of Kinkel; Lord Bridge of Harwich; Lord Brightman; Lord Templeman

Keywords
- Leases; licenses

Street v Mountford [1985] UKHL 4 is an English land law case from the House of Lords. It set out principles to determine whether someone who occupied a property had a tenancy (i.e. a lease), or only a licence. This mattered for the purpose of statutory tenant rights to a reasonable rent, and had a wider significance as a lease had "proprietary" status and would bind third parties.

Lord Templeman held that the defining feature of a lease was exclusive possession, despite the fact that this view had been rejected and heavily criticised in a number of Court of Appeal cases previously, for example in the judgment of Denning LJ in Errington v Errington.

== Facts ==
On 7 March 1983, Roger Street, a Bournemouth solicitor, gave rooms 5 and 6 in No 5 St Clement’s Gardens, Boscombe to Mrs Wendy Mountford for a ‘licence fee’ of £37 a week, terminable on fourteen days’ notice. Mrs Mountford also signed a form saying she understood the Rent Act 1977 did not apply to regulate her rental payments. The Rent Act 1977 at the time applied to leases only, not licences, and required landlords accept a rent which was deemed fair by an independent officer or tribunal, and also required more than fourteen days’ notice would be given. Mrs Mountford argued that she had a lease.

The judge held Mrs Mountford did have a lease, and Mr Street appealed.

== Judgment ==
=== Court of Appeal ===
The Court of Appeal [1985] 49 P&CR 324 held the written agreement was clear that Mr Street did not intend that. Slade LJ, 322, ‘there is manifested the clear intention of both parties that the rights granted are to be merely those of a personal right of occupation and not those of a tenant.’

=== House of Lords ===
The House of Lords held that despite a contrary intention expressed by the contract, Mrs Mountford did have a lease. Lord Templeman gave the leading judgment. He started by saying that a tenancy is a term of years absolute by common law and the Law of Property Act 1925, section 205(1)(xxvii). Originally they were not property rights, but a legal estate in leaseholds was created by the Statute of Gloucester 1278 and the Recoveries Act 1529 (21 Hen. 8. c. 15). He also noted that it was conceded that Mrs Mountford was given exclusive possession, and then landlords will only have limited rights to enter, view and repair.

In the case of residential accommodation there is no difficulty in deciding whether the grant confers exclusive possession. An occupier of residential accommodation at a rent for a term is either a lodger or a tenant. The occupier is a lodger if the landlord provides attendance or services which require the landlord or his servants to exercise unrestricted access to and use of the premises. A lodger is entitled to live in the premises but cannot call the place his own. In Allan v Liverpool Overseers (1874) LR 9 QB 180, 191-2, Blackburn J said:

‘the landlord is there for the purpose of being able, as landlords commonly do in the case of lodings, to have his own servants to look after the house and the furniture, and has retained to himself the occupation, though he has agreed to give the exclusive enjoyment of the occupation to the lodger.’

[...]

He may be owner in fee simple, a trespasser, a mortgagee in possession, an object of a charity or a service occupier.

[...]

It was submitted on behalf of Mr. Street that the court cannot in these circumstances decide that the agreement created a tenancy without interfering with the freedom of contract enjoyed by both parties. My Lords, Mr Street enjoyed freedom to offer Mrs Mountford the right to occupy the rooms comprised in the agreement on such lawful terms as Mr Street pleased. Mrs Mountford enjoyed freedom to negotiate with Mr Street to obtain different terms. Both parties enjoyed freedom to contract or not to contract and both parties exercised that freedom by contracting on the terms set forth in the written agreement and on no other terms. But the consequences in law of the agreement, once concluded, can only be determined by consideration of the effect of the agreement. If the agreement satisfied all the requirements of a tenancy, then the agreement produced a tenancy and the parties cannot alter the effect of the agreement by insisting that they only created a licence. The manufacture of a five pronged implement for manual digging results in a fork even if the manufacturer, unfamiliar with the English language, insists that he intended to make and has made a spade.

[...]

I accept that the Rent Acts are irrelevant to the problem of determining the legal effect of the rights granted by the agreement. Like the professed intention of the parties, the Rent Acts cannot alter the effect of the agreement.

[...]

My Lords, the only intention which is relevant is the intention demonstrated by the agreement to grant exclusive possession for a term at a rent. Sometimes it may be difficult to discover whether, on the true construction of an agreement, exclusive possession is conferred.

Lord Templeman went on to refer to and adopt Windeyer J in the Australian case Radaich v Smith saying the fundamental feature of a lease is exclusive possession. Lord Scarman, Keith, Bridge and Brightman concurred.

== Significance ==
In relation to residential properties, a line of cases have attempted to resolve the related issues of what amounts to exclusive possession and what amounts to a 'dwelling', as the legal effect of Street v Mountford, taken together with the Rent Act 1977 (as amended by the Housing Act 1988), is that a tenancy or lease exists only if exclusive possession is granted of 'a dwelling'.

In all these cases the courts have repeatedly stressed the need to look at the reality of the arrangement, and to disregard the artificial labels which are typically employed in the documents. Such documents, being invariably drafted by the landlord, represent only the landlord's view of the rights being created.

In AG Securities v Vaughan (1988) the House of Lords decided that exclusive possession had not been granted, where up to four agreements existed simultaneously for the sharing of a single flat by unrelated occupiers, as there was an actual sharing of occupation. Also, in a joined appeal referred to as Antoniades v Villiers, a case concerning a self-contained flat, the agreement expressly denied that the occupier had exclusive possession, and expressly provided for the owner to allow others to share the premises. The House of Lords decided that as the flat was in reality too small to accommodate others, so that it was incapable of actually being shared, the wording was merely a pretence intended to evade the Rent Act, and that in law the arrangement accordingly amounted to a grant of exclusive possession.

In Family Housing Association v Jones (1990), where a housing association housed homeless persons temporarily, the Court of Appeal decided that a tenancy was nevertheless created, because in reality it was intended that Mrs Jones and her child were to be the only occupiers, paying weekly, and in practice they did not actually share the accommodation; notwithstanding an express provision in the agreement that she did not have exclusive possession, and despite the association holding a key.

By way of contrast, in Westminster CC v Clarke (1992) a resident of one room in a hostel had an agreement permitting the hostel's owner unrestricted access to the room, and containing a provision enabling the occupier to be compelled to share the room. There was no actual sharing; but the arrangement was nevertheless held to be a licence, not a tenancy, as the room did not amount to a separate dwelling.

== See also ==
- English property law
- English land law
