= Thomas v Sorrell =

1673 English court case

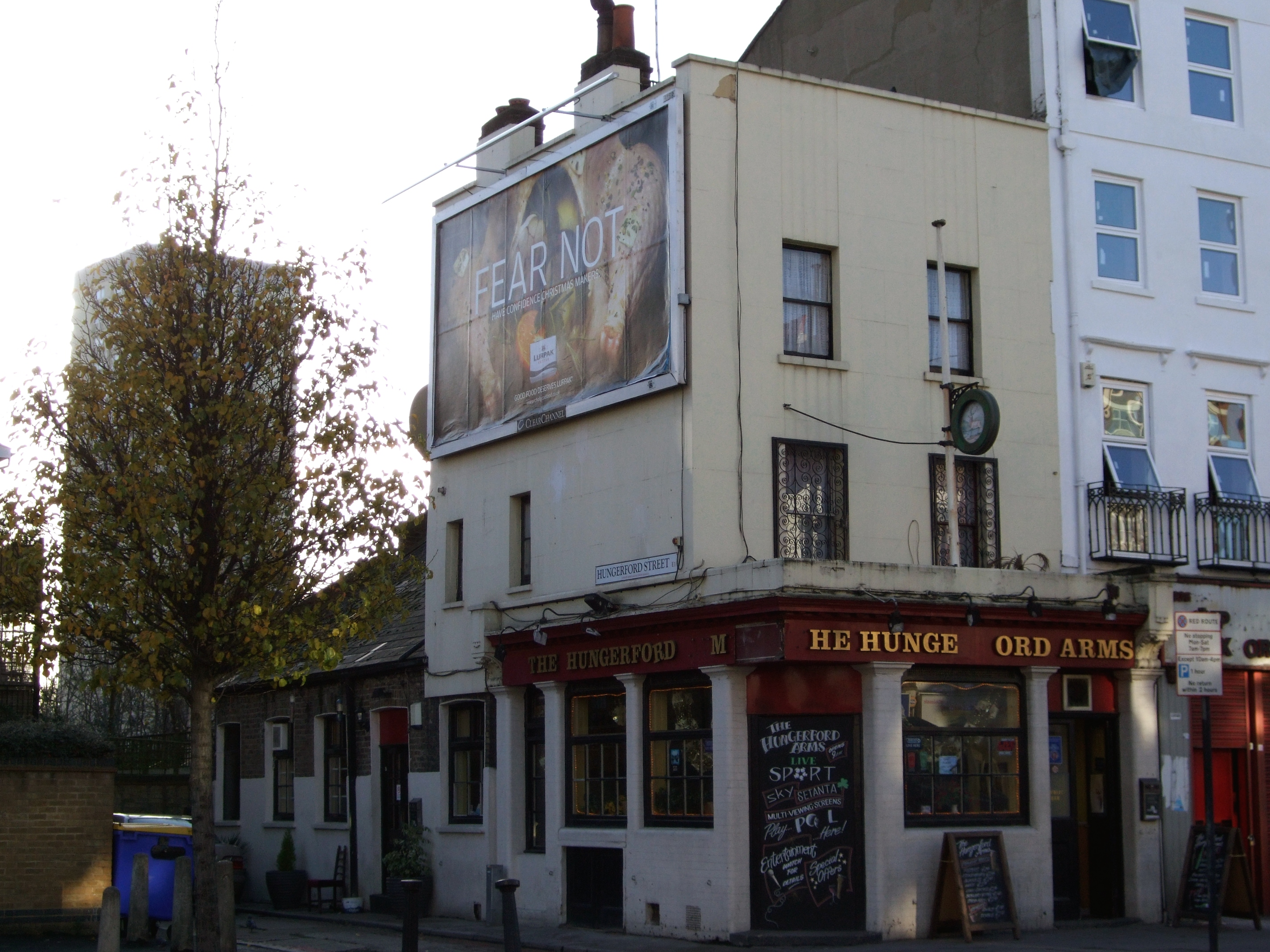
- Full case name: Edward Thomas v Thomas Sorrell
- Citations: [1673] EWHC (KB) J85 (1673) Vaugh 330; 124 ER 1098-1113

Court membership
- Judge sitting: Vaughan CJ

Keywords
- Licence; alcohol licensing; fines and penalties; statutory dispensation (proviso); Vintners' Company; pro bono publico (laws for the public good) defeating letters patent ultra vires (outside the powers of) the royal prerogative

Thomas v Sorrell [1673] EWHC (KB) J85 is an English law case, concerning licences. It has been cited in cases in relation to land but has no direct link to land e.g. occupation. It was landmark decision in the law of alcohol licensing (licensing law) and summarizes centuries of law as to licences — it sets out the bold principles of licences of many kinds.

== Facts ==
Thomas Sorrell owned a tavern in the village of Stepney, some 2 miles (3.2 km) east of the City of London. He was prosecuted by Edward Thomas, acting for the Crown, who demanded that Sorrell pay a penalty to the Crown of £450 for selling having sold wine without a licence, contrary to the Taxation Act 1660. Sorrell claimed that he had a licence in his capacity as a member of the "Master, Wardens, Freemen, and Commonalty of the Mystery of Vintners of the City of London".

The Taxation Act 1660 contained the following provision:

Provided also, that this Act, or any thing therein contained, shall not extend, or be prejudicial to the Master, Wardens, Freemen, and Commonalty of the Mystery of Vintners of the City of London, or to any other city or town corporate, but that they may use and enjoy such liberties and priviledges, as heretofore they have lawfully used and enjoyed.

== Judgment ==
=== Jury ===
That as to all the debt, except fifty pounds, the defendant owes nothing. And as to the fifty pounds, they find the statute of 7 E. 6, c. 5, concerning retailing of wines, prout in the statute.

=== Chief Justice advising jury on their decision and award ===
Vaughan CJ said:

A dispensation or licence properly passeth no interest, nor alters or transfers property in any thing, but only makes an action lawful which, without it, had been unlawful. As a licence to go beyond the seas, to hunt in a man's park, to come into his house, are only actions, which without licence, had been unlawful.

[...]

So to license a man to eat my meat, or to fire the wood in my chimney to warm him by, as to the actions of eating, fireing my wood and warming him, they are licences; but it is consequent necessarily to those actions that my property be destroyed in the meat eaten, and in the wood burnt, so as in some cases by consequent and not directly, and as its effect, a dispensation or licence may destroy and alter property.’

Therefore, the conception of the statute was upheld, as was its proviso in favour of the Vintners. It was not illegitimately interfering with settled property rights nor discriminating unfairly against the general public, considering earlier statutes, nor putting the Vintners at an unfair advantage as Parliament had ordained such a licensing system.

The special alternate verdicts put to the jury were:

A) Si pro quer. quoad 50l. pro quer. (If for the claimant, £50 for the claimant). As stated above this was the verdict. The Taxation Act 1660 did contain a free liberty, a dispensation for the Vintners to sell without having to pay the usual penalty for no express specific licence to sell on a particular premises. The £50 arose from the defeat of the dispensatory (royal) letters patent of 2 February the 9th Year of James I (1612) to the Vintners, incapable of modifying the taxation provisions of the Wines Act 1553 (7 Edw. 6. c. 5) as purportedly made by James I against a law (the 1553 statute) which was for the public good.

So as now it is only insisted on, that the patent of 9 Jac. was void in its creation, for two reasons.

1. For that the law of 7 E. 6 was such a law, pro bono publico, as the King could not dispence against it, more than with some other penal laws, pro bono publico....
2. If he could to particular persons, he could not to the Corporation of Vintners, and their successors, whose number or persons the King could never know; and that it stood not with the trust reposed in him by the law, to dispense so generally without any prospect of number or persons. - Vaughan CJ

[...]

I must say as my brother Atkins observed before, that in this case the plaintiffs council argue against the Kings prerogative, for the extent of his prerogative is the extent of his power, and the extent of his power is to do what he hath will to do, according to that, ut summm potestatis Regis est posse quantum velit sic magnitudinis est velle quantum potest; if therefore the King have a will to dispense with a corporation, as it seems K.[King] James had in this case, when the patent was granted, but by law cannot, his power, and consequently his prerogative, is less than if he could.

B) Si pro def. pro def. 1s. (If for the defendant, 1/20th of £1 (a shilling) for the defendant). The jury did not reach this verdict. As directed, King James had exceeded his prerogative in his royal letters patent so the statute of Edward VI on wine taxation stood.

== See also ==
- Alcohol licensing laws of the United Kingdom
  - Licensing Act 2003
