= Rates in the United Kingdom =

Property taxes in the United Kingdom

Rates are a tax on property in the United Kingdom used to fund local government. Business rates are collected throughout the United Kingdom. Domestic rates are collected in Northern Ireland and were collected in England and Wales before 1990 and in Scotland before 1989.

Rates are usually paid by the occupier of a property, and only in the case of unoccupied property does the owner become liable to pay them.

== Domestic rates ==
=== England and Wales ===
Rates formally became universal by the Poor Relief Act 1601; this removed all doubt that parishes (vestries) should and could levy a poor rate to fund the Poor Law. They often levied these earlier to fund poor law relief. Indeed, the Court of Appeal in 2001 said "The law of rating is statutory and ancient, going back even before the Poor Relief Act 1601".

As local government developed, separate rates were collected by parish authorities, borough corporations and county authorities. The County Rates Act 1739 ended the practice of separate rates being levied for individual purposes, such a highway rate and provided for a unified county rate.

Rates on residential property were based on the nominal rental value, reassessed periodically in revaluations. By the Rating and Valuation Act 1925 (15 & 16 Geo. 5. c. 90), revaluations were supposed to take place every five years but in practice they were frequently delayed or suspended. Revaluations took place in 1928/1929, 1934, 1956 (but based on 1939 values), 1963, and 1973. A revaluation due in the early 1980s was scrapped by the Secretary of State for the Environment Michael Heseltine in June 1979, with Heseltine urging householders to tear up the forms already sent out by the Valuation Office.

As part of the transition to regional water authorities, water charges continued to be collected by local councils on their behalf until 1978/79. The 1973 valuation is still used to calculate water rates for households on unmetered supplies.

Rates in England and Wales in 1990 were briefly replaced with the Community Charge (so called "poll tax"), a fixed tax per head that was the same for everyone within a council area, a figure that could differ greatly per local authority. This was soon replaced with the Council Tax, a system based on the estimated market value of property assessed in bands of value, with a discount for people living alone.

=== Northern Ireland ===
Domestic rates are the current local government taxation in Northern Ireland. Domestic rates consist of two components, the Regional rate set by the Northern Ireland Assembly and the District rate set by 11 district councils. Rate levels are set annually. The domestic rates are based on the capital value of the residential property on 1 January 2005. Valuation and rating of property is handled by Land and Property Services. Domestic rates are now unique to Northern Ireland within the United Kingdom.

=== Scotland ===
As in England, the individual domestic rates bill was calculated by multiplying the rateable valuation of a property by the domestic poundage rate set by the local Council. Before the 1996 reform of local government, domestic rates were set by Regional Councils, and prior to the 1975 reorganisation, rates were set by County Councils.

The rateable value of domestic properties was recorded in valuation rolls, which provide an important historical source, as they record the name of the head of the household for every home in Scotland on set years; usually at five yearly intervals. All transfers of property ownership in Scotland are recorded in the Register of Sasines or the Scottish Land Registry.

Domestic rates were a more stable income source for local government as they are based entirely on property values which provide greater financial certainty to councils - reducing their cost of borrowing. Evasion of domestic rates was also more difficult in Scotland than in England as property ownership in Scotland can be more easily proven as Scots law has required public registration for a transfer of property to be effective since 1694, whereas HM Land Registry is incomplete and a compulsory public declaration is a more recent requirement. Council Tax is slightly easier to evade than domestic rates as liability for Council Tax falls on the occupants rather than the property owner - the UK does not have a complete identity register therefore Councils must rely on other forms of identification - such as the electoral roll to identify, locate and pursue Council Tax evaders.

Rates were abolished in Scotland in 1989 and replaced with the Community Charge which was in turn replaced by the Council Tax as in England and Wales. Since devolution, there have been attempts to replace Council Tax in Scotland with a Local income tax and a Land Value Tax.

== Business rates ==
Rates on non-residential property (business rates) are still charged, at a uniform rate set by central government. Rates are collected by local councils, and were, until recently, distributed nationally. Each local authority now keeps the money they collect meaning that some local authorities collect a disproportionate amount when compared to number of residents.

Rating assessments (rateable values) are made on all non-domestic properties. As well as business, this includes village halls and other non-business occupations. The exception to this is where a hereditament is exempt by virtue of Schedule 6 of the Local Government Finance Act 1988 which specifies exempt classes.

The rateable value should represent the reasonable rental value of the occupation according to the circumstances at the "Material Day" and according to rental values at the "Antecedent Valuation Date". (For the compiled 2005 Rating List the "Material Day" is 1 April 2005 and the "Antecedent Valuation Date" is 1 April 2003).

Later physical changes will have a later Material Day but the Antecedent Valuation Date will still be 1 April 2003 for the currency of the 2005 Rating List. The Rating List is a public document.

From April 2023, retailers will receive temporary support from the government with business rates with a 75% discount on business rates up to a limit of £110,000 per business, following shop closures reaching a 5 year high.

== Other rates ==
Taxes raised for other purposes are also called rates in the United Kingdom.

- In some parts a drainage rate must be charged to fund drainage work which protects these low-lying and erosion-subjected parts from flooding. The first Act of Parliament to authorise the collection of drainage rates was the Statute of Sewers, passed by King Henry VIII in 1531, which established a chronologically ordered principle of no benefit, no rates. This hampered the work of drainage authorities for four centuries – as to intended/inceptive work they could only charge permanent occupiers voluntarily receiving direct benefit, or face valid legal objection. Overturned by the Land Drainage Act 1930, repealing 20 Acts from 1531 to the Land Drainage Act 1929, the setup became catchment boards, to cover a whole river basin. These charge drainage rates to people anywhere in them. As to farming, rates apply to all occupiers of agricultural land and buildings within a drainage district. This saw reiteration and other laws made, in the Land Drainage Act 1991.
- The Crown Estate Paving Commission levies local statutory rates on paving by residential property it covers around Regent's Park, London, under the Crown Estate Paving Act 1851 (14 & 15 Vict. c. 95).
- Leasehold properties rest on the terms of the lease, with little regulation of their terms, but the possibility of revision (variation or rectification) by negotiation or representation. In lease draftsmanship the terms "estate charge" and "service charge" dominate.
- Rates can attach to freeholds by express original covenant on the title such as for the optional promenade use in Halsall v Brizell, or communal garden use in garden squares. The case was approved by Rhone v Stephens, but narrowed. Lord Templeman said the following.

In Halsall v Brizell the defendant could, at least in theory, choose between enjoying the right and paying his proportion of the cost or alternatively giving up the right and saving his money. In the present case the owners of Walford House could not in theory or in practice be deprived of the benefit of the mutual rights of support if they failed to repair the roof.

Thus someone with property above or below a freehold (for example) may struggle to oblige that freehold's owner to carry out their moral obligations, without a prior deed of rentcharge or enduring chain of deed of covenants, due to the high value placed on privity of contract and privity of estate as these together benefit otherwise burdened freeholds.
