= Covenant (law) =

Solemn promise to engage in or refrain from a specified action

A covenant, in its most general and historical sense, is a solemn promise to engage in or refrain from a specified action. Under historical English common law, a covenant was distinguished from an ordinary contract by the presence of a seal. Because the presence of a seal indicated an unusual solemnity in the promises made in a covenant, the common law would enforce a covenant even in the absence of consideration. In United States contract law, an implied covenant of good faith is presumed.

A covenant is an agreement like a contract. A covenantor makes a promise to a covenantee to perform an action (affirmative covenant in the United States or positive covenant in England and Wales) or to refrain from an action (negative covenant). In real property law, the term real covenants refers to conditions tied to the ownership or use of land. A "covenant running with the land", meeting tests of wording and circumstances laid down in precedent, imposes duties or restrictions upon the use of that land regardless of the owner.

A covenant for title that accompanies a deed or title to the property assures the purchaser that the grantor has the ownership rights the deed purports to convey. Non-compete clauses in relation to contract law are also called restrictive covenants.

Landlords may seek, and courts may grant forfeiture of leases, such as in leasehold estates for breach of covenant, which, in most jurisdictions, must be relatively severe breaches; however, the covenant to pay rent is one of the more fundamental covenants. The forfeiture of a private home involves interference with social and economic human rights. In the case of leases commuted to a large sum payable at the outset (a premium), this has prompted lobbying for, and government measures for leasehold reform, particularly in the law of ground rents and service charges.

Restrictive covenants are somewhat similar to easements and equitable servitude. In the US, the Restatement (Third) of Property merges the concepts into servitudes. Real covenant law in the US has been referred to as an "unspeakable quagmire" by one court.

== Related to land ==
In property law, land-related covenants are called "real covenants", " covenants, conditions and restrictions " (CCRs) or "deed restrictions" and are a major form of covenant, typically imposing restrictions on how the land may be used (a negative covenant) or requiring a certain continuing action (an affirmative covenant). These may also "run with the land" (called a covenant appurtenant), meaning that any future owners of the land must abide by the terms, or may apply to a particular person (called a covenant in gross or of a purely personal nature). Under English law, affirmative covenants typically do not run with the land; in the United States such covenants are examined more closely, but with exceptions affirmative covenants have been permitted to run with the land.

The covenant may be shown in the deed and should be disclosed to prospective purchasers; it may also be recorded, or in the case of Commonwealth countries shown in Torrens title. Real covenants and easements or equitable servitudes are similar and in 1986, a symposium discussed whether the law of easements, equitable servitudes, and real covenants should be unified. As time passes and the original promisee of the covenant is no longer involved in the land, enforcement may become lax.

Covenants may be imposed through homeowner associations, and controversy has arisen over selective enforcement. Historically, particularly in the United States, exclusionary covenants were used to exclude racial minorities. Some covenants exist for safety purposes, such as a covenant forbidding the construction of tall buildings in the vicinity of an airport or one restricting the height of fences/shrubs at street corners (so as not to interfere with drivers' sight lines). Covenants may restrict everything from the height and size of buildings to the materials used in construction to superficial matters such as paint color and holiday decorations. In residential areas, covenants may forbid "dirty" businesses (such as feedlots or chemical production facilities) or business use entirely, or modifications such as amateur radio antenna. Amateur radio restrictions have been particularly controversial; in 1985 the U.S. Federal Communications Commission issued PRB-1 preempting state and local restrictions, but not private restrictions; in 2012 after Congress passed a law requiring study of this issue (at the urging of amateur radio group ARRL), the FCC declined to extend this preemption. Some US states have enacted legislation requiring homeowners' associations to provide reasonable accommodations for amateur radio antennas under the rationale that amateur radio provides public service communications in the event of an emergency, major disaster, or special event.

== Application by jurisdiction ==
=== Canada ===
In Canada, governmental authorities may use restrictive covenants as well as zoning. For instance, the City of Calgary's requirement that buildings in the general vicinity of Calgary International Airport be under a certain height is registered against virtually every title in the northeast quadrant of the city as a restrictive covenant, not as a zoning by-law.

=== England and Wales ===
At common law, the benefit of a restrictive covenant runs with the land if three conditions are met:

- The covenant must not be personal in nature – it must benefit the land rather than an individual
- The covenant must 'touch and concern' the land – it must affect how the land is used or the value of the land
- The benefited land must be identifiable.

At common law, the burden of a restrictive covenant does not run except where strict privity of estate (a landlord/tenant relationship) exists.

The burden can be enforced at law in limited circumstances under the benefit/burden test - that is, whoever takes the benefit must also shoulder the burden. In Halsall v Brizell [1957] Ch 169, a covenant requiring the upkeep of roads was found to bind the successor in title to the original covenantor because he had elected to take the benefit. The rule in Halsall v Brizell is limited to cases where the benefit can be linked to a specific burden and where the covenantor's successors in title can physically elect to take the benefit. For example, a restrictive covenant to contribute to the maintenance costs of a common area will not be binding if the covenantor's successors in title have no legal right to use them. Rules for ascertaining whether the benefit of a covenant has been passed to another person who wishes to enforce the covenant were summarised in Small (Hugh) v Oliver & Saunders (Developments) Ltd. in 2006, namely by an express assignment of the benefit, through a building scheme arrangement, usually for a new development of multiple properties, or through the application of section 78 of the Law of Property Act 1925, which only applies for covenants made since 1 January 1926.

A positive burden can run in law, but not in equity, as it is deemed to be analogous to a contract, to which equitable principles do not apply (Rhone v Stephens (1994)).

The burden of a restrictive covenant will run in equity if these prerequisites are met:

- The burden cannot be a positive burden (that is, it requires expenditure to meet it);
- The purchaser must have notice of the covenant
- The covenant must benefit the covenantee's land
- The covenant must be intended to run with the covenantor's land.

The leading case on restrictive covenants in equity is generally regarded as that of Tulk v Moxhay, in which it was determined that the burden could run in equity subject to the qualifications listed above.

The risk of an undisclosed restrictive covenant coming to the notice of a buyer or developer after they have acquired a site has been seen as especially high in regard to infill residential development. Restrictive covenant indemnity insurance is often available to mitigate this risk.

=== Requirements in US law ===
The covenant will typically be written in the deed, and must be in writing due to the statute of frauds. Although scholars have argued that some of the following should be significantly relaxed, in order for the burden to run with the land the following must apply:

- The covenant must be in writing to satisfy the Statute of Frauds.
- The original parties to the agreement must have intended that successors be bound by the agreement.
- A subsequent owner must have had actual notice, inquiry notice, or constructive notice (record) of the covenant at the time of purchase.
- The covenant must touch or concern the land. The covenant must relate to the use or enjoyment of the land.
- There must be horizontal privity between the original parties.
  - Horizontal privity is found if, at the time the original parties enter into the agreement, those parties share some interest in the subject land independent of the covenant (e.g., landlord and tenant, mortgagee and mortgagor, or holders of mutual easements). Individual state statutes can alter the requirements of horizontal privity of estate. Privity may be instantaneous and mutual; instantaneous privity is present when the restrictive covenant is within the deed initially conveyed from the grantor to the grantee.
- There must be strict vertical privity of estate.
  - Vertical privity characterizes the relationship between the original party to the covenant and the subsequent owner. To be bound by the covenant, the successor must hold the entire estate in land held by the original party (strict vertical privity of estate). Note that because strict vertical privity is required for a burden to run, a lessee could not have a burden enforced against them. However, a benefited party could sue the owner of the reversion of the estate, and the owner could possibly sue the lessee for waste.

==== Enforcement and modification ====
US courts interpret covenants relatively strictly and give the words of the agreement their ordinary meaning. Generally if there is any unclear or ambiguous language regarding the existence of a covenant courts will favor free alienation of the property. Courts will not read any restrictions on the land by implication (as is done with easements for example). A covenant can be terminated if the original purpose of the covenant is lost. In some cases property owners can petition a court to remove or modify the covenants, and homeowner associations may include procedures for removing the covenants.

The covenant may be negative or affirmative. A negative covenant is one in which property owners are unable to perform a specific activity, such as block a scenic view. An affirmative covenant is one in which property owners must actively perform a specific activity, such as keeping the lawn tidy or paying homeowner's association dues for the upkeep of the surrounding area.

An agreement not to open a competing business on adjacent property is generally enforceable as a covenant running with the land. However, under the federal Supreme Court's holding in Shelley v. Kraemer, 334 U.S. 1 (1948), a covenant that restricts sale to a minority person (commonly used during the Jim Crow era) is unenforceable, as enforcement would require the court to act in a racially discriminatory manner, contrary to the Equal Protection Clause of the Fourteenth Amendment.

==== In planned communities ====
In contemporary practice in the United States, a covenant typically refers to restrictions set on contracts like deeds of sale. "Covenants, conditions, and restrictions," commonly abbreviated "CC&Rs" or "CCRs", are a complicated system of covenants, known generically as "deed restrictions", built into the deeds of all the lots in a common interest development, particularly in the tens of millions of American homes governed by a homeowner association (HOA) or condominium association. There are some office or industrial parks subject to CCRs as well.

These CCRs might, for example, dictate the types of structures that can be built (e.g., a CCR may prohibit any type of modular, prefabricated, or mobile home or may require the structure to be a minimum size), appearance (e.g., no junk cars), or other uses (e.g., no operation of home-based business, no pets except traditional household animals). The purpose of this is to maintain a neighborhood character or prevent improper use of the land. Many covenants of this nature were imposed in the United States in the 1920s through the 1940s, before zoning became widespread. However, many modern developments are also restricted by covenants on property titles; this is often justified as a means of preserving the values of the houses in the area. Covenant restrictions can be removed through court action, although this process is lengthy and often very expensive. In some cases it even involves a plebiscite of nearby property owners. Although control of such planning issues is often governed by local planning schemes or other regulatory frameworks rather than through the use of covenants, there are still many covenants imposed, particularly in states that limit the level of control over real property use that may be exercised by local governments. In Houston, Texas, the lack of a local zoning ordinance means that property owners make heavy use of deed restrictions to prevent unwanted development.

== Exclusionary covenants ==
Covenants have been used to exclude certain classes from owning real estate based on race, religion or ethnicity. These groups are generally marginalized groups.

=== United States ===
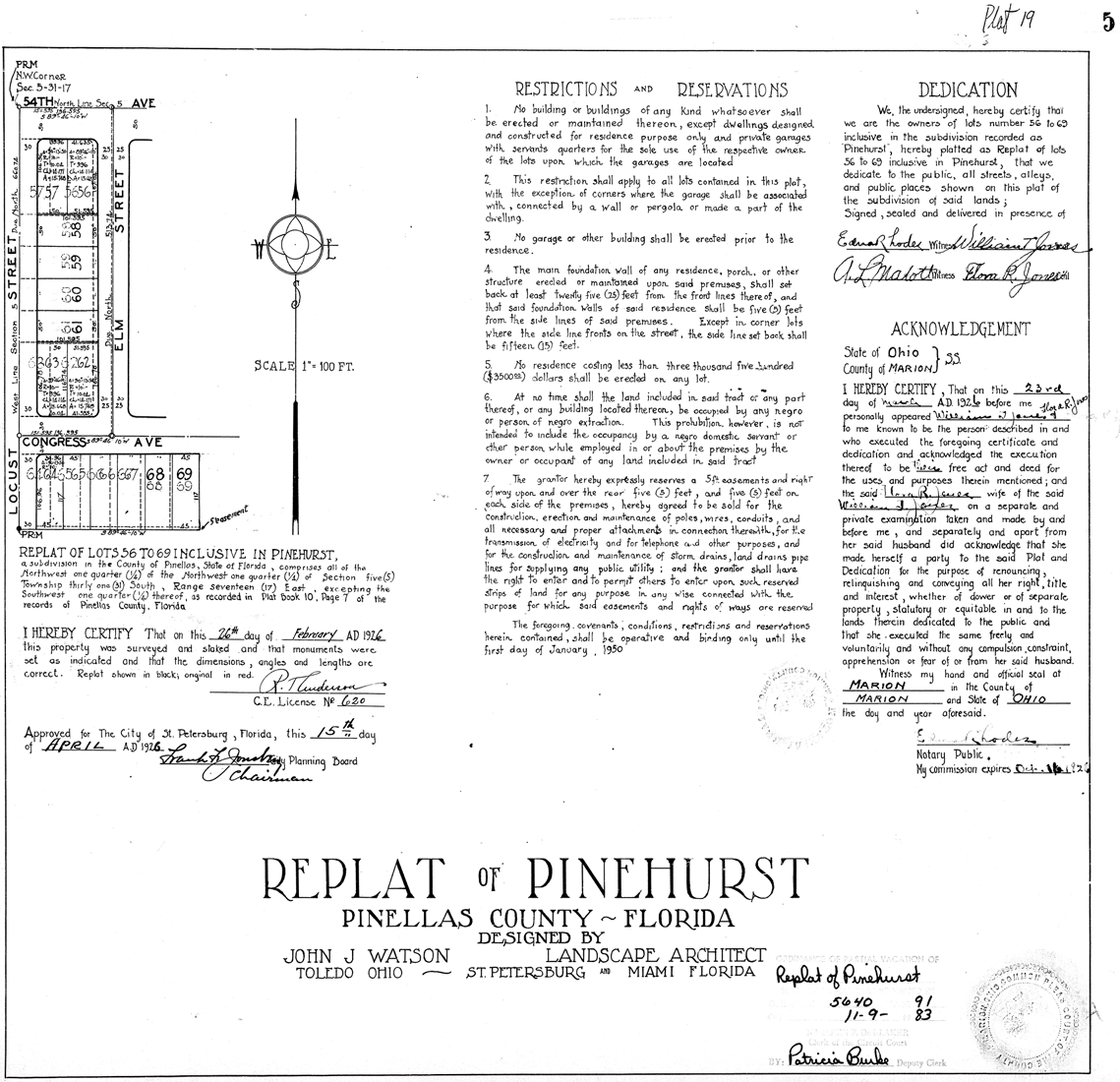
A Florida subdivision plat from 1926 with a racially-discriminatory deed restriction: "At no time shall the land included in said tract ... be occupied by any negro or person of negro extraction".

In the United States, in the early 20th century zoning laws were used to prevent integrating neighborhoods but were struck down in Buchanan v. Warley. Thus, deed restrictions and restrictive covenants became an important instrument for enforcing racial segregation in most towns and cities, becoming widespread in the 1920s and proliferating until they were declared unenforceable in 1948 in the Supreme Court case Shelley v. Kraemer. They prohibited a buyer of real property from allowing use or occupancy by members of a given race, ethnicity, or religion as specified in the title deed. Such covenants were employed by many real estate developers to "protect" entire subdivisions, with the primary intent to keep "white" neighborhoods "white". Ninety percent of the housing projects built in the years following World War II were racially restricted by such covenants. Cities known for their widespread use of racial covenants include Chicago, Baltimore, Detroit, Milwaukee, Los Angeles, Seattle, and St. Louis.

Said premises shall not be rented, leased, or conveyed to, or occupied by, any person other than of the white or Caucasian race.

— Racial covenant for a home in Beverly Hills, California.

Often the restrictions applied only to African Americans wishing to buy property or rent a house or apartment, but other populations might also be banned, such as Asians, Jews, Indians, and some Latinos. For example, a restrictive covenant covering a large neighborhood in Seattle declared that "no part of said property hereby conveyed shall ever be used or occupied by any Hebrew or by any person of the Ethiopian, Malay or any Asiatic Race", thus banning Jews and anyone of African, Filipino, or Asian ancestry. The exclusionary language varied widely. Some neighborhoods were reserved for the "White or Caucasian race". Others enumerated banned populations. One subdivision near Seattle specified that "This property shall not be resold, leased, rented or occupied except to or by persons of the Aryan race." The Lake Shore Club District in Fairview, Pennsylvania sought to exclude various minorities, including "Negroes", "Mongolians", Hungarians, Mexicans, Greeks, and various other European ethnicities.

In Montgomery County, Maryland, covenants excluded Black Americans and sometimes included language excluding Jews, Armenians, Iranians, Syrians, Turks, Greeks, Indians, Chinese, Japanese, Mongolians, Asians in general, or "non-Caucasians" in general.

Covenants in Massachusetts localities excluded Black Americans and sometimes Irish, Italian and Polish people as well. One 1881 deed from Lowell, Massachusetts stated that "land shall never be deeded or conveyed to any person born in Ireland". A 1916 covenant in Springfield, Massachusetts, stated that "said lot shall not be resold to a colored person, a Polander or an Italian."

Some covenants, such as those tied to properties in Forest Hills Gardens, New York, also sought to exclude working class people; however, this type of social segregation was more commonly achieved through the use of high property prices, minimum cost requirements, and application reference checks.

Covenants in Seattle, Washington, typically banned Black and Asian people and sometimes Jews.

Covenants in Hennepin County and Ramsey County, Minnesota excluded African Americans and sometimes Asians and Middle Easterners. Prior to 1919, covenants sometimes excluded Jews. One Minneapolis covenant excluded "any person or persons of Chinese, Japanese, Moorish, Turkish, Negro, Mongolian or African blood or descent." In 1953, the Michigan Legislature banned new covenants and in 1962 the legislature banned housing discrimination on the basis of race, religion or national origin.

==== History ====
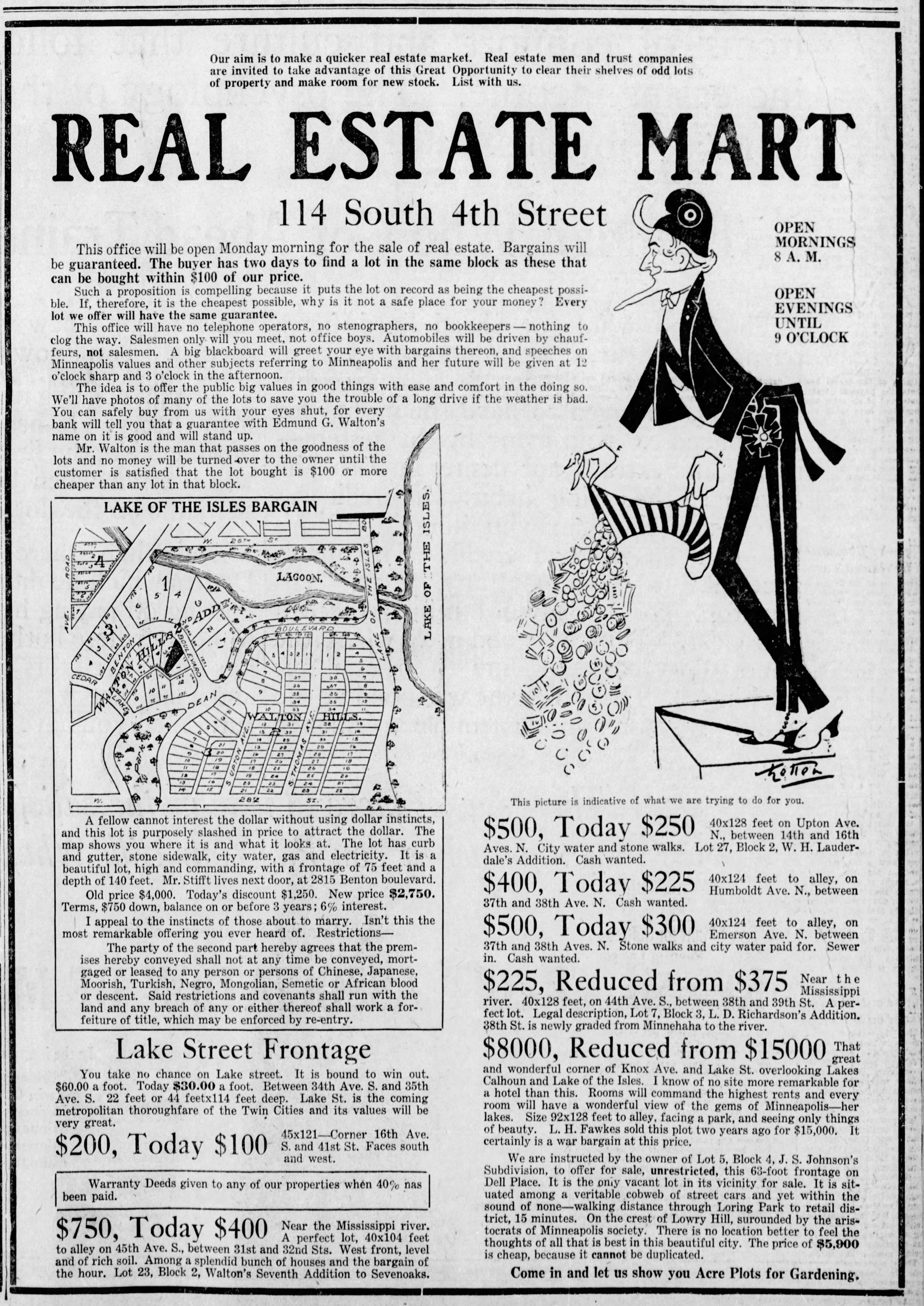
Real estate advertisement including restrictions on "any person of Chinese, Japanese, Moorish, Turkish, Negro, Mongolian, Semetic [sic] or African blood or descent", (Minneapolis Tribune 1919)

Racial covenants emerged during the mid-19th century and started to gain prominence from the 1890s onwards. It was not until the 1920s that they gained widespread national significance, and continued to spread through the 1940s. Racial covenants were an alternative to racially restrictive zoning ordinances (residential segregation based on race), which the 1917 US Supreme Court ruling of Buchanan v. Warley invalidated on constitutional grounds.

During the 1920s, the National Association for the Advancement of Colored People (NAACP) sponsored several unsuccessful legal challenges against racial covenants. In a blow to campaigners against racial segregation, the legality of racially restrictive covenants was affirmed by the landmark Corrigan v. Buckley 271 U.S. 323 (1926) judgment ruling that such clauses constituted "private action" not subject to the Due Process Clause of the Fourteenth Amendment. This cleared the way for racial restrictive covenants to proliferate across the US during the 1920s and 1930s.

Even the invalidation of such a covenant by the US Supreme Court in the 1940 case of Hansberry v. Lee did little to reverse the trend, because the ruling was based on a technicality and failed to set a legal precedent. It was not until 1948 that the Shelley v. Kraemer judgment overturned the Corrigan v. Buckley decision, stating that exclusionary covenants were unconstitutional under the Fourteenth Amendment and were therefore legally unenforceable. On December 2, 1949 US solicitor general Philip Perlman announced that the "FHA could no longer insure mortgages with restrictive covenants".

Some commentators have attributed the popularity of exclusionary covenants at this time as a response to the urbanization of black Americans following World War I, and the fear of "black invasion" into white neighborhoods, which residents felt would result in depressed property prices, increased nuisance (crime), and social instability. Many African Americans openly defied these covenants and attempted to "pioneer" restricted areas. But even still the covenants played a role as "gentlemen agreements", it wasn't until 1962, that the Equal Opportunity in Housing executive order was signed by President John F. Kennedy, prohibiting using federal funds to support racial discrimination in housing. This caused the FHA to "cease financing subdivision developments whose builders openly refused to sell to black buyers."

In 1968, Congress passed the Fair Housing Act (Title VIII of the Civil Rights Act of 1968) which outlawed housing discrimination based on race, color, religion, sex, or national origin. In 1988, it was expanded to prohibit discrimination based on familial status (e.g. the presence of children) or disability. It wasn't until 1972 that the Mayers v Ridley decision ruled that the covenants themselves violated the Fair Housing Act and that county clerks should be prohibited from accepting deeds with such clauses.

==== Persistence of exclusionary covenants ====
Although exclusionary covenants are not enforceable today, they still exist in many original property deeds as "underlying documents", and title insurance policies often contain exclusions preventing coverage of such restrictions. It is not always easy to remove them from the chain of title. Since 2010, the Seattle Civil Rights & Labor History Project has located more than 500 restrictive covenants and deeds covering more than 20,000 properties in Seattle and its suburbs. In response, the Washington State legislature passed a law that since January 1, 2019 allows property owners to "modify" property records, disavowing the offensive restriction. Mapping Inequality, a collaboration of three teams at four universities, has identified restrictive covenants in various parts of the United States. The Mapping Prejudice project at the University of Minnesota has collected restrictive covenants in the Minneapolis area.

==== Examples ====
- Forest Hills Gardens, Queens, New York – covenants forbade the sale of real property to Black, Jewish, and working-class people.
- Jackson Heights, Queens, New York – covenants employed to restrict occupancy to white, non-immigrant Protestants.
- Washington Park Subdivision, Chicago, Illinois – restrictive covenants used to exclude African Americans.
- Palos Verdes Estates, Los Angeles, California – covenants forbade an owner to sell or rent a house to anyone not of the white or Caucasian race or to permit African Americans on their property with the exception of chauffeurs, gardeners, and domestic servants.
- Upper Arlington, Ohio – covenants forbade the sale of real property to Black people or Jews, but allowed for "colored" servants to reside in the homes in which they served.
- Guilford, Baltimore, Maryland – covenants provided for exclusion against "negros or persons of negro extraction".
- Williamstown, Massachusetts, in 1939 prohibited any non-white not in domestic service from living in the town.
- Kansas City metropolitan area (examples include Country Club and Johnson County) – restrictive covenants used to exclude African American and "Semitic" persons.
- West Orange, New Jersey - one 1892 covenant stated "We do not sell to Colored People, Italians, Polanders, or Bohemians..."

=== Outside the US ===
Although most commonly associated with the United States, racially or ethnically restrictive covenants have been used in other countries:

- Canada – Subdivisions such as Westdale, Ontario employed racial covenants to bar a diverse array of ethnic groups, such as Armenians and foreign-born Italians and Jews. Opposition to exclusionary covenants was significant in Canada, culminating in the 1945 Re Drummond Wren ruling by the Ontario High Court which invalidated their use. This judgment was influential in guiding similar decisions in the United States and elsewhere.
- France – During World War II, under the Vichy regime in the Free Zone outside the Nazi occupied area, some condominiums inserted clauses forbidding selling to Jews.
- South Africa – racial covenants emerged in Natal during the 1890s as an attempt to prevent Indians from acquiring properties in more expensive areas, and were commonplace across the country by the 1930s. They were later used as a tool to further the cause of apartheid against the black population.
- Zimbabwe – Asians and coloured people were excluded from purchasing or occupying homes in European areas by restrictive racial covenants written into most title deeds.

== Title covenants ==
Title covenants serve as guarantees to the recipient of property, ensuring that the recipient receives what he or she bargained for.

=== In England and Wales ===
Since 1989, the main covenants implied in England and Wales on "limited" or "full title guarantee" (unless expressly overridden) are:

1. that the person making the disposition has the right (with the concurrence of any other person conveying the property) to dispose of the property as he purports to, and
2. that that person will at his own cost do all that he reasonably can to give the person to whom he disposes of the property the title he purports to give.
3. [In the case of a disposition of an existing legal interest] (a) where the title to the interest is registered, it shall be presumed that the disposition is of the whole of that interest; (b) [if unregistered and not leasehold, then the presumption it is of the fee simple]
4. [If involving a lease] (a) that the lease is subsisting at the time of the disposition, and

(b) that there is no subsisting breach of a condition or tenant's obligation, and nothing which at that time would render the lease liable to forfeiture.

Others as to charges, incumbrances, and third-party rights vary depending on whether full or limited title guarantee is agreed.

=== Outside of England and Wales ===
Outside of England and Wales, the English covenants of title, sometimes included in deeds to real property, are (1) that the grantor is lawfully seized (in fee simple) of the property, (2) that the grantor has the right to convey the property to the grantee, (3) that the property is conveyed without encumbrances (this covenant is frequently modified to allow for certain encumbrances), (4) that the grantor has done no act to encumber the property, (5) that the grantee shall have quiet possession of the property, and (6) that the grantor will execute such further assurances of the land as may be requisite (Nos. 3 and 4, which overlap significantly, are sometimes treated as one item). The English covenants may be described individually, or they may be incorporated by reference, as in a deed granting property "with general warranty and English covenants of title...".

== See also ==
- Private transfer fee
