= Freehold (law) =

Common mode of ownership of real property

A freehold, in common law jurisdictions or Commonwealth countries such as England and Wales, Australia, Canada, Ireland, India and the United States, is the common mode of ownership of real property, or land, (Note: All land in Great Britain "belongs", i.e. if all other ownership rights are unproven, to "the Crown". In practice there are many statutes which vest certain types of land such as infrastructure and the beds of "main rivers" in other authorities. Likewise bona vacantia (vacant property, deemed to belong to the Crown, in some other countries land called "unowned") is not immediately treated as capital of the Crown (in practice the government, this having by long custom been gifted to the Chancellery). A fair period and notice is given for company rescuers, creditors, missing intestacy or testamentary heirs to come forward before its escheat to the government means it can be sold or leased as a windfall to the government Treasury through the Bona Vacantia Division. Freehold is an ownership of an estate in land rather than the land itself. This distinction dates back to the Middle Ages and makes a relatively little difference nowadays, so legal authorities often do not bother to distinguish between ownership of the land and ownership of an estate. Attainder has also been abolished as to forfeiture of interests in land: mostly by the Forfeiture Act 1870 and residually, as to a narrow crime, by the Criminal Law Act 1967. This principle is also cited, with approval, by the Courts of record in upholding the right, if compensation is at the market value, of government to make without impropriety, any non-irrational, procedurally fair, compulsory purchase in England and Wales and Scotland.) and all immovable structures attached to such land.

It is in contrast to a leasehold, in which the property reverts to the owner of the land after the lease period expires or otherwise lawfully terminates. For an estate to be a freehold, it must possess two qualities: immobility (property must be land or some interest issuing out of or annexed to land) and ownership of it must be forever ("of an indeterminate duration"). If the time of ownership can be fixed and determined, it cannot be a freehold. It is "an estate in land held in fee simple, fee tail or for term of life".

The default position subset is the perpetual freehold, which is "an estate given to a grantee for life, and then successively to the grantee's heirs for life".

== England and Wales ==
=== Diversity of freeholds before 1925 ===
In England and Wales, before the Law of Property Act 1925, the default position was the fee simple estate, a freehold transferable to the owner's "heirs and assigns" (successors by inheritance, or purchase/gift, respectively). Those three words were often included in a conveyance to stress fee simple status. A fee tail estate describes when transfer (by inheritance or otherwise) was limited to lineal descendants of the first person to whom the estate was given (known as "heirs of the body" or "heirs of the blood"). There were also freehold estates not of inheritance, such as an estate for life and copyhold was promoted into freehold by the Act.

=== Rentcharges and payments by way of positive covenants ===
All estates can be subject to payments to an influential prior owner – or land management person or body for multi-property (communal) benefit (estate rentcharges). The most viable form is the form for a neutral or pre-agreed source to collect communal benefit payments, the estate rentcharge. Either type is usually protected by registering the deed of rentcharge against the land. They can be extinguished by a compensation-based statutory procedure, which removes the regular administrative burden on both parties.

Estate rentcharges are potentially subject to abuse, known as "fleecehold".

Any existing rentcharges other than estate rentcharges will be extinguished on 22 August 2037.

Should the owner be guaranteed to benefit or wish to benefit from a communal infrastructure that requires maintenance, not funded by taxation, then Halsall v Brizell (regarding an estuary wall) and Re Ellenborough Park (regarding a communal garden) confirm that in those circumstances positive covenants run with freehold land. This means active duties to pay can exist – in very closely analogous cases – but are otherwise generally void as to freeholds.

=== Adverse possession ===
Freeholds (rather leaseholds if subject to a leasehold) could quite easily be acquired by squatting before the Land Registration Act 2002.

Since its passage such rights are dominated by precisely fixing on the line of neighbouring plots in mutual-boundary disputes, after 12 years without formal contest. This is as there is otherwise a requirement to put the previous legal owner on written notice – which must have been received, or deemed received such as by recorded delivery, and be given fair opportunity to object. It is also more easily applicable to unregistered land, which is the status of a tiny number of parcels of non-agricultural freehold land in England.

=== Legal owners as trustees for beneficiaries ===
More than one legal owner means the land is deemed to be on trust. This doctrine is designed to bind the parties to act fairly to each other in the eyes of the law of equity. In default of other provision, such as mention of a trust deed, or background facts, the beneficiaries will be deemed to be the trustees (those named on the registered title) themselves. If a trustee dies then the statutory trustees take their place, or those appointed by a probated Will. Similarly if a company is wound up then the right to act as the trustee and be registered as a legal trustee vests in the liquidator.

As regards third parties interested in lending against or purchasing the land the general doctrine helping them is the bona fide purchaser without actual nor constructive notice doctrine. This is however subject to all of the prudent surveyors, conveyancer's and physical checks having been carried out well which is formulated in the countering doctrine of caveat emptor (buyer beware). A beneficiary in patent actual possession can still enjoy rights as against a purchaser, or more commonly a mortgage or other secured lender, under the Land Registration Act 2002.

Trustees are bound by the terms of the trust, but the strict rules and maxims of equity and by any decision formally made by all of the adult beneficiaries.

Inequities the Trusts of Land and Appointment of Trustees Act 1996 (TLATA) (Note: Pronounced /təˈlɑːtə/ by lawyers) resolved included the fact that it was hard to establish a trust without it coming under the auspices of the Settled Land Act 1925. That earlier Act brought a range of problems. In particular, the co-owners of property were regarded as having beneficial interests in money and not in the land. Problems arose where partners disagreed over when they wanted to sell a property – usually in the case of separation. This led to situations where spouses and children could find themselves removed from their customary home inequitably.

One of the key features of TLATA is its imposition of statutory considerations to be taken into account when dealing with the disposition of trusts and ordering a sale of a family home.

== Hong Kong ==
St John's Cathedral is the only freehold land in Hong Kong, with a statutory requirement that the land must be used for religious purposes of the Church of England. All other lands are granted in leasehold.

== See also ==
- Allodial title
- Homeowner association
