= Rhone v Stephens =

English land law case

- Court: House of Lords
- Citations: [1994] UKHL 3, [1994] 2 AC 310

Keywords
- Covenants

Rhone v Stephens [1994] UKHL 3 is an English land law case, at the court of final appeal level, concerning the succession to the burden of positive covenants in freehold land within which it is of relatively broad application. It is distinguished in cases of regular payments related to easements in English law which are enjoyed (see Halsall v Brizell) and some other narrow categories, many of which are similarly well-known and well-cited notable cases.

== Facts ==
Walford House was primarily a house but partly the building was a small cottage. When the small cottage was sold, as a sale of part, and as freehold land, the owner of the main house (vendor) covenanted to keep the whole roof in repair. The roof fell into disrepair and the cottage owner wished to sue the vendor's successor in title to carry out the works (specific performance) and/or for damages.

== Judgment ==
Lord Templeman held that the covenant could not be enforced because the covenant was positive. His judgment said the following.

Equity cannot compel an owner to comply with a positive covenant entered into by his predecessors without flatly contradicting the common law rule that a person cannot be made liable upon a contract unless he was a party to it. Enforcement of a positive covenant lies in contract; a positive covenant compels an owner to exercise his rights. Enforcement of a negative covenant lies in property; a negative covenant deprives the owner of a right over property...

To enforce a positive covenant would be to enforce a personal obligation against a person who has not covenanted. To enforce negative covenants is only to treat the land as subject to a restriction...

[Counsel had...] referred to an article by Professor Sir William Wade and other articles in which the present state of the law is subjected to severe criticism. In 1965 a report by a committee appointed by the Lord Chancellor and under the chairmanship of Lord Wilberforce, referred to difficulties caused by the decision in the Austerberry case, and recommended legislation ... the present law on positive rights was described as being illogical, uncertain, incomplete and inflexible… Nothing has been done.

... experience with leasehold tenure where positive covenants are enforceable by virtue of privity of estate has demonstrated that social injustice can be caused by logic. Parliament was obliged to intervene to prevent tenants losing their homes and being saddled with the costs of restoring to their original glory buildings which had languished through wars and economic depression for exactly 99 years [the exact length of many leases, which contained an obligation "to reinstate" the premises].

He also rejected the view that the benefit and burden principle could be taken to its logical conclusion to enforce the carrying out of independent positive obligations.

== Other legal arrangements ==
The judgement has no impact on the law of leases (which in the case of land automatically create leasehold estates) nor on the law of rentcharges agreed by deed and registered against freehold land. Either of these can be used to provide means to enforce a broad range of positive covenants.

== See also ==
- English land law
- English property law
- English trust law
