= Positive covenant =

A positive covenant is a kind of agreement relating to land, where the covenant requires positive expenditure by the person bound, in order to fulfil its terms. Unlike a restrictive covenant, a covenant to perform a positive act does not "run with the land" and therefore does not bind the covenantor’s successors in title.

Relevant case law was developed in an English Court of Appeal case, Austerberry v Oldham Corporation (1882).

== See also ==
- English land law
- Equitable servitude
- Easement
- Halsall v Brizell, 1957
