= Fleecehold =

Property ownership with onerous terms

Fleecehold refers to the inclusion of onerous terms in the deeds of a freehold property in the United Kingdom. The practice of fleecehold is known to be increasing in the UK, according to the results of FOI requests to the Land Registry. At a minimum, tens of thousands of houses are affected, but it is unknown how quickly the number is increasing. There have been several proposals by elected officials and campaign groups to abolish or mitigate the practice, and it has been questioned in Parliament and the devolved assemblies.

A fleecehold property is usually taken to mean one that has deeds or a lease that allow a management company to impose a service charge on the householder. The service charge means that a payment must be made to the management company in return for the company performing certain items of maintenance on common land or amenities where the property is situated. This practice has obvious advantages for the local authority and property developer. The local authority does not need to adopt common land and amenities on the estate and does not bear the cost or responsibility for their upkeep. The developer in turn does not need to build any of these amenities (such as roads, pathways, flowerbeds and drainage systems) to the standards that local authorities require for them to be adopted. The owners of fleecehold properties still have to pay the full council tax on their property even though they have to additionally pay a private company to maintain the estate's amenities.

== Leasehold ==
Leaseholders have some statutory rights defined in the Landlord and Tenant Act 1985 which can prevent the worst practices of fleecehold. For example, leaseholders have the right to see all invoices and receipts for work which the management company has undertaken and recharged to the leaseholders. They may also challenge the reasonableness of charges at the First Tier Tribunal. However, such action requires meticulous attention from leaseholders to build their case, and many simply do not have the time and skills required to do this.

== Freehold ==
In relation to estate charges, freeholders are legally in a more disadvantageous position than leaseholders. Freeholders are not covered by the service charge provisions in the Landlord and Tenant Act 1985 and have no statutory rights to see any documentary evidence relating to the service charge or to challenge the reasonableness of the service charge. Because the agreements are imposed by covenants in their deeds, they are not covered by consumer law and in many cases the management company is named in their deeds so there is no option to use a different company for maintenance. Their only recourse is to make or defend a claim in court, however because freeholders have no rights to see any invoices etc. it can be extremely hard to build a case.

Also, covenants in the property deeds usually allow the management company to claim legal expenses as part of the service charge so the management company actually has nothing to lose by going to court (their legal costs can always be reclaimed through the service charge) and they will often employ expensive legal professionals. Even if the freeholder wins their case they will pay the legal costs of the management company through the service charge.

Finally, the deeds of a freehold property may make reference to an estate rentcharge on the property which allows the management company to undertake extremely draconian measures (possibly leading to the management company taking possession of the property) if the service charge is not paid. The threat of losing their house for not paying a service charge is enough to deter many freeholders from contesting the service charge.
