= Crown Estate Paving Commission =

- CEPC logo
- Abbreviation: CEPC
- Formation: 1824
- Headquarters: London, NW1
- Coordinates: 51.5247°N 0.1453°W
- Region served: Regent's Park
- Website: www.cepc.org.uk

The Crown Estate Paving Commission (CEPC) is the body responsible for managing certain aspects of the built environment around Regent's Park, London. The commissioners have been referred to as the Crown Estate Paving Commissioners or the Crown Paving Commissioners. The CEPC was established by statute in 1824. It fulfills some local government functions, and it is one of the few bodies in the United Kingdom still empowered to levy rates on residential property. Although it has local government functions and tax-raising powers, its members are not elected but are appointed by the Lords of the Treasury. It is a separate body from the Crown Estate, which holds the freehold of Regent's Park.

== History ==
The CEPC was established by statute in 1824, when it was given responsibility for care and maintenance of the Crown Estate from Whitehall along Regent Street to Regent's Park. Improvement commissioners each set up under local acts were a typical 18th and 19th century solution to improving the built environment outside of the usual parish vestry system, and were empowered to levy their own rate to fund paving and improvement works.

Crown Estate Paving Act 1851 (Note: Section 5.)
- Act of Parliament
- Parliament of the United Kingdom
- Long title: An Act for transferring the Duties of paving, lighting, watering, and cleansing Parts of the Crown Estate in the District of the Regent's Park and certain Streets and Places in Westminster from the Commissioners acting under several Acts of Their late Majesties King George the Fourth and King William the Fourth to the Parishes; and for transferring the Jurisdiction of the said Commissioners over certain other Places in Westminster to the Commissioners of Her Majesty's Works and Public Buildings; and for other Purposes.
- Citation: 14 & 15 Vict. c. 95
- Territorial extent: United Kingdom

Dates
- Royal assent: 7 August 1851
- Commencement: 7 August 1851 (Note: The Acts of Parliament (Commencement) Act 1793.)

Status: Current legislation

Text of statute as originally enacted

Subsequent statutes extended its responsibilities to include the maintenance of Crown Estate properties in Westminster, but under the Crown Estate Paving Act 1851 (14 & 15 Vict. c. 95), the commission lost responsibility for managing the Regent Street, Whitehall and Westminster properties. It has retained responsibility for the Waterloo gardens in Carlton House Terrace.

The CEPC was explicitly excluded from the Metropolis Management Act 1855 that otherwise reformed local government in the metropolitan area of London.

The CEPC has enforced the Crown Estate Paving Act 1851 through court actions. In 1944, a Scottish MP was fined for failure to remove signs advertising a club.

The 2010 London Festival of Architecture sought permission from the CEPC to lay a new pathway in the park, as part of the construction of a London Las Ramblas, designed by noted British urban architect Sir Terry Farrell, after the original in Barcelona. CEPC commissioner Sir John Ritblat was also on the board of the festival.

== Jurisdiction ==
Since 1851 the area of the commission has been Regent's Park between the Outer Circle and, clockwise from Gloucester Gate, Albany Street, Marylebone Road, Allsop Place and Park Road to Hanover Gate. The eastern section is in the London Borough of Camden and the western section is in the City of Westminster, with the boundary between them running north–south through the park.

== Functions ==
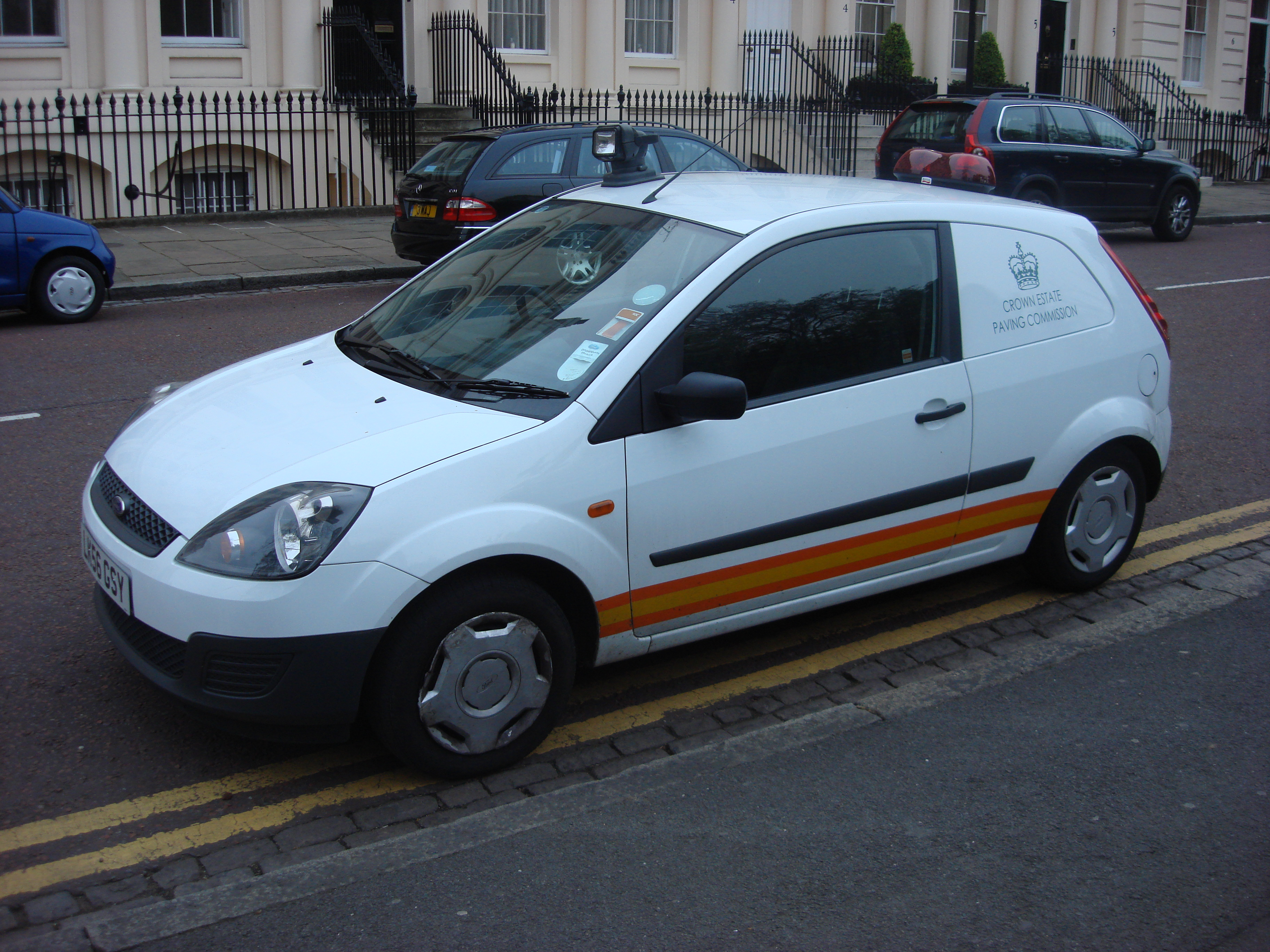
A Crown Estate Paving Commission owned Ford Fiesta

The commission's responsibilities include maintaining street lighting and street furniture in the park, maintaining the roadways of certain streets immediately surrounding the park, regulating parking in those streets, collection of domestic refuse and opening and shutting the park gates. The Commission also maintains the terrace gardens adjacent to the public park. It also regulates requested modifications, such as pathways. The public park itself is managed by The Royal Parks.

== Funding ==
CEPC has statutory authority under the Crown Estate Paving Act 1851 to collect rates from the occupiers of buildings in the streets which it manages numbering about 1,200. The rates pay for matters which elsewhere are funded by Council Tax, but the occupiers are also liable to pay Council Tax to Camden London Borough Council or Westminster City Council without relief for the CEPC rates assessed on them. Before 1990 residents in the CEPC area paid lower General Rates to the councils. The introduction of the Community Charge brought this to an end. CEPC applied for a Council Tax Local Discount, which would reduce the Council Tax of residents in the CEPC area and increase it in the rest of the London boroughs, but it was refused.
