= Private transfer fee =

A private transfer fee covenant is a legal instrument that is filed in the real property records, which imposes an assessment payable in connection with a series of future transfers of title to certain real property. The assessment can be for a fixed amount or a percentage of the sales price, and typically runs for a limited term (usually ranging from 20 to 99 years). Unlike a transfer tax (payable to a governmental entity) a private transfer fee assessment is payable to an identified third-party, often a community association (like a homeowners' association, or "HOA"), the real estate developer, and/or an environmental or charitable organization. According to the Coalition to Save Community Benefits, private transfer fee covenants of some kind encumber approximately eleven million homes in the United States. Although encumbering a statistically small percentage of the estimated 135 million homes nationwide, increased use of private transfer fee assessments, particularly by real estate developers beginning around 2007, when financing became difficult to obtain on commercially reasonable terms, lead to increased regulation at both the federal and state level.

== Process ==
=== Recordation ===
Private transfer fee covenants are filed in the real property records of the county in which the real property that is to be made subject to the fee is located. The instrument is typically styled "Declaration of Covenant", "Covenants, Conditions and Restrictions", or similar, and is executed by the property owner, known as the "Declarant". Commonly, the Declarant is a real estate developer who creates the assessment for purposes of recovering expenses incurred in connection with infrastructure and other capital improvements made to or in connection with the property.

=== Notice ===
Purchasers of real estate encumbered by a private transfer fee assessment receive both constructive and actual notice of the assessment.

Constructive notice is notice inferred from the record and it exists whether or not the purchaser inspects the record. It exists when the record reveals the outstanding claim even if the purchaser must make an inquiry to ascertain the validity of the claim. It is the legal equivalent of actual notice. "Recordation implies knowledge, and knowledge implies acceptance." This is true whether or not a subsequent purchaser receives actual notice. A recorded document that is a link in a purchaser's chain of title provides constructive notice.

Private transfer fee covenants are recorded in the real property records. In addition, private transfer fee statutes in Alabama, California, Colorado, Connecticut, Louisiana, Minnesota, Nebraska, Nevada, New Jersey, New York, North Dakota, Pennsylvania, South Carolina, South Dakota, Utah, and Wyoming (as of 2017) require that a separate disclosure document must also be filed in the real property records. The act of filing these documents in the public records provides constructive notice to purchasers.

Actual notice exists when a purchaser has actual knowledge or information that a claim is outstanding against the property he or she proposes to acquire. It exists even though the purchaser may have to make an inquiry to ascertain the validity of the claim. Since the private transfer fee covenant, as well as any additional state-mandated notices, are filed in the public records, these documents should appear in a properly prepared title commitment or abstract of title, providing actual notice to purchasers.

In addition, private transfer fee statutes in Alabama, California, Connecticut, Kentucky, Maine, Nebraska, New Jersey, North Dakota, Pennsylvania, South Dakota and Texas require that the sales contract between the buyer and the seller disclose the existence of a private transfer fee covenant, which provides an additional form of actual notice.

Actual notice and constructive notice are legally equivalent, and only one type of notice is generally required for real property claims. "Plaintiffs with notice of a covenant generally may not complain of the covenants existence." In the absence of either type of notice a property claim is generally unenforceable against bona fide purchasers. Depending on applicable state law, an unrecorded private transfer fee covenant would generally be unenforceable against either the property or the purchaser, absent specific disclosure to the purchaser, and then would still likely be subordinate to certain subsequent claims recorded in the real property records.

=== Payment ===
In a typical transaction for the sale of real estate encumbered by a private transfer fee assessment, a contract for purchase of the real property is receipted at the title company. The title company then provides the prospective purchaser with a title commitment showing all encumbrances of record, including the transfer fee assessment. Alternatively, the closing process may be handled by an attorney, and an abstract of title provided in lieu of the title commitment. During this "title review" period, the prospective purchaser decides whether or not to proceed with the transaction.

At closing, the transfer fee is shown on the closing statement, collected from either the buyer or seller (as provided in the assessment covenant or as otherwise agreed by the parties), and generally remitted to a servicing agent, which acts on behalf of the holders of the transfer fee assessment.

=== Expiration ===
A private transfer fee covenant generally terminates after a specific period of time, at which point the property is no longer encumbered by the private transfer fee assessment.

=== Delinquency ===
Private transfer fee covenants, like similar covenants and restrictions attached to real property, generally provide for legal and equitable remedies, including foreclosure of a lien and a claim against the owner, who, in taking title to the real estate, takes title "subject to" all claims and assessments. In addition, as with any unpaid fee or assessment, a private transfer fee covenant will generally provide for interest on unpaid sums.

If a transfer fee is not remitted when due, title will still pass, since the encumbrance represents an indirect restraint, and not a direct restraint, on alienation. However, a superior claim against the property will exist, and the closing therefore is unlikely to satisfy lender closing instructions that generally require the title company to ensure (and insure) that the lender is in a superior position as to liens and claims.

== Debate and controversy ==
=== Purpose ===
Supporters of private transfer fee assessments suggest that by recovering capital improvement costs over time by means of an assessment, in lieu of placing these costs into the shoulders of each initial buyer (who must then finance these costs and pass them along to future buyers), the developer can lower the initial sales price. Opponents argue that there is no evidence that the sales price is actually lowered in consequence of the assessment.

Supporters respond that no one will pay the same for a home encumbered by an assessment as they would for the same home that is unencumbered, and point to studies that support this contention, as well as conclusions from legislative analysis, including:

- Modern Finance vs. Behavioral Finance: An Overview of Key Concepts and Major Arguments (Current information flows are the sole determinant of current asset price movements and market prices are the best reflectors of the fundamental values of their underlying assets.);
- The efficient-market hypothesis ("markets adjust prices to reflect the current information available to market participants");
- Cal. Legislative Analysis (concluding that "[a] homebuyer who knows that she must pay such a fee upon subsequent resale will pay the developer less for the home than for a comparable property. Likewise, future buyers will pay less to the seller.");
- The Economics of Private Transfer Fee Covenants (2010), ("[t]he assumption is that the seller will lower the sales price [in consideration for the assessment]. This assumption is well-founded because economic theory suggests that buyers armed with the facts will not pay the same for a home with a transfer fee as they will pay for the same home without a transfer fee.");
- Residential Property Tax Capitalization: Discount Rate Evidence from California, (concluding that property buyers are efficient at capitalizing costs assessed against real estate, even if they do not realize this is what they are doing.)

=== The Parties ===
Support for the use of private transfer fees largely came from community associations, real estate developers and various environmental and non-profit organizations. Opposition to the rise of private transfer fee covenants arose largely from the National Association of Realtors ("NAR") and the American Land Title Association ("ALTA").

=== Realtor opposition ===
Handouts to realtors warned that a seller faced with a transfer fee might ask the real estate agent to reduce their commission, referred to as a "commission-ectomy" Publicly, realtors positioned their opposition as a consumer issue, arguing that property owners receive no benefit from private transfer fees paid to a developer.

Transfer fee supporters countered that (1) the "no benefit" argument failed to recognize that the developer builds the water lines, sewer systems, roads, utilities and homes that buyers possess and use on a daily basis throughout the life of a transfer fee covenant; (2) the value created in a development arises from these same improvements, it being undisputed that homes in communities with water lines, sewer lines, paved streets, parks, amenity centers and similar infrastructure - all installed by the developer at the developer's expense - clearly benefit from the improvements, and sell for more than homes without connections to similar infrastructure; (3) that a developer transfer fee apportions the burden of paying for infrastructure over those who use, and benefit from, the infrastructure; and (4) that transfer fees are exclusively paid by a buyer (a) who agreed to pay the fee and negotiated the price accordingly and, (b) by assuming the obligation to pay the fee presumably analyzed the benefits and the burdens associated with the transaction and determined for his or her own self whether or not the transaction was beneficial.

In a 2008 White Paper, Realtors worried that "private transfer fees could increase the cost of homes or, upon their discovery, result in the cancellation of purchase agreements." However, the NAR paper conceded that "whether this proves to be a legitimate concern is as yet uncertain."

=== Title industry opposition ===
Title industry opposition centered around the potential for title claims that could result if the title company missed an assessment. Transfer fee supporters responded that the potential for a claim arising from a document that was properly filed in the public records yet still overlooked by the title company was not unique to a private transfer fee covenant, but instead was inherent in every mortgage, lien, encumbrance and other document filed in the deed records. Supporters also pointed out that less than 5% of title insurance premiums are paid in claims, and that every claim arises from the title company's negligence.

The title industry asserted that transfer fee covenants "impair marketability" by "unduly complicating real estate closings" as a result of the fee being "inadequately disclosed". The American Land Title Association, in an October 15, 2010 letter to the Federal Housing Finance Agency on behalf of their 3,800 title company members, wrote:

"consumers are not allowed the choice to decide if they want a property with a covenant attached or not. Private transfer fees are often buried in a stack of documents in the chain of title called Covenants, Conditions and Restrictions (CC&R). These covenants are a proverbial twelve page needle in what can be a two hundred page haystack. Consumers are not given the CC&R until at or right before closing and many people do not read, much less comprehend them before closing. The obscurity of the covenant in this dense document could lead consumers to remain unaware of the covenant until they are at the closing table or worse, when they go to sell their home."

Transfer fee supporters responded that (1) the existence of all assessments, including HOA dues, special assessments, etc., is disclosed early in the contract stage, when buyers have an opportunity to review all matters of title before deciding to proceed with the purchase; (2) this disclosure/decision process is identical to other fees, such as HOA dues and assessments, which, following the "needle in the haystack" theory, re also equally hidden; and (3) a hidden fee would not get paid, which eliminates any incentive to hide the fee and provides every incentive to ensure that the fee is prominently disclosed.

=== Economic debate ===
==== Lower price? ====
Opponents argue that there is no proof that buyers actually pay a lower price. A Ph.D. Land Economist writing about private transfer fees observed that this contention seems "illogical" since market theory says, and legislative analysis concurs, and common sense suggests, that an informed buyer will not pay the same for land encumbered by a private transfer fee as they would for the same land without a private transfer fee. Instead, the price a buyer pays reflects all available information in the marketplace, including alternative choices available to the buyer. Stated another way, the price a buyer is willing to pay is an amount that the buyer has determined to be acceptable to that particular buyer, based on all known facts and circumstances. The idea that there is a "right" price is a logical fallacy: the price that is right for one person may not be right for another.

Opponents suggest that even if the initial price is reduced, the total fees over time to total increased costs. Supporters respond that each buyer will pay less than they otherwise would have paid for the unencumbered land. Moreover, supporters point out that a lower sales price leads to lower closing costs (including a lower title insurance premium), lower mortgage financing costs, lower carrying costs, easier access to credit and other savings that accrue from paying less for the home. In addition to the quantifiable savings, a buyer may consider intangible issues such as [if a] portion of the transfer fee that goes to non-profits, and whether the Buyer can qualify for the lower priced home ([being sold] with a transfer fee) but would be unable to qualify for the [same] higher priced home ([being sold] without a transfer fee), and reallocation of the savings (i.e. does the buyer pay down high interest credit card debt with the savings). All of these variables go into the decision-making process and both buyer and seller make an economic decision based upon their respective perceptions of the market value of the trade. If these perceptions match, a bargain is struck and the transaction is Pareto-efficient. ... (When the parties to a transaction come away satisfied with the bargain they have made.)"

==== Infrastructure costs ====
Critics suggest that a private transfer fee is simply a way to enrich developers. Supporters argue that a private transfer fee is a viable alternative way to pay for multi-million dollars infrastructure costs incurred by the developer. In "Financing Infrastructure over Time", the author looked at the impact of financing infrastructure and concluded that "inter-temporal equity in terms of allocating [infrastructure] costs to those who cause them, efficiency in terms of internalizing costs of infrastructure to those who benefit from it, and stability all argue for bond financing over pay as you go for financing capital facilities."

From the buyer's perspective, the willingness to pay a [transfer] fee in the future in return for a lower initial price will result in lower acquisition costs, reduced carrying costs, and An economic system that is Pareto-efficient is an important metric for evaluating economic efficiencies and public policies. Private transfer fee covenants balance the needs of the buyer, the developer, and the community in a Pareto-efficient way by more efficiently restructuring the economics of the real estate transaction. [italics orig; underline. added]

Like Dr. McPeak's analysis, legislative staff analysis in California observed that the market will adjust the price of the house to reflect the fee, with the only legitimate concern being to ensure adequate notice to the buyer. Stated another way, "If future takers purchase a piece of property with notice of a restriction made by a predecessor, then, in the absence of duress or fraud, they may ordinarily be thought to have bargained for the property with the restriction in mind, and to have shown themselves willing to abide by it."

In Residential Property Tax Capitalization: Discount Rate Evidence from California, the authors looked at homes encumbered by a Mello-Roos assessment, and found "statistically significant" evidence that the market accounts for the present value of an encumbrance that required payment of a fee. A Mello-Roos assessment is a fee, paid by property owners encumbered by a Mello—Roos assessment, where the funds are used to repay a developer for infrastructure. The use of proceeds is thus indistinguishable, but with an important distinction: Mello-Roos fees are paid annually, which requires the debt service to be included in the mortgage qualification process, whereas a transfer fee paid at the time of sale is not included in debt service for mortgage calculation purposes.

Additional support for the contention that a transfer fee makes property more affordable can be found within many of the prohibitory statutes themselves. A number of private transfer fee covenant laws require the seller to disclose the existence of the transfer fee and, failing to do so, the buyer can recover the difference between the market value of the real property subject to the private transfer fee obligation and the market value of the real property if the real property were not subject to the private transfer fee. Paradoxically, these statutes are largely predicated on the assumption (advanced by the NAR and ALTA) that there is no evidence that transfer fees reduce home prices, yet the very legislation they advanced tacitly concedes that transfer fees do in fact lower home prices. If a transfer fee did not in fact lower home prices, there would be no need to define this "diminished value" remedy yet if home prices are lowered, buyers obviously benefit from easier qualifying, lower transaction costs, and lower carrying costs – in exchange for payment of the transfer fee at the time of a future sale.

The fact that a private transfer fee lowers home prices, and reduces the monthly or annual debt service burden, has important public policy implications for housing affordability. It is undisputable that a lower sales price, and/or lower debt service, means that a buyer might qualify to purchase a home that otherwise might be unaffordable, particularly when it comes to entry level housing. Like the FHFA Rule, the impact of state transfer fee prohibitions is to ensure that homeowners with imperfect credit cannot choose how to buy their homes, and must buy worse homes than they might otherwise afford, it being of little import that a developer is willing to spread out capital improvement costs.

The reality is that filing a document in the deed records is generally fatal to a legal argument of inadequate disclosure, because the encumbrance will appear on a properly prepared title commitment. In addition, modern recording statutes give private transfer fee covenants just as much visibility as any other encumbrance of record, allowing buyers to make an informed decision.

In its October 15, 2010 letter to the FHFA, ALTA next asserts, "separate conspicuous disclosure of a private transfer fee covenant in the land records would not inform consumers...." arguing that:

"[a] title search is routinely performed after the consumer enters into a contract to purchase the home. Discovery of a disclosure would thus not occur until a time in the real estate closing process when a transaction is all but complete, giving a consumer a disincentive to delay the process in order to make an informed decision regarding the effect of the covenant on the property. These extremely complex covenants will have to be explained to the consumer at the closing table, when they have the least incentive to walk away from the deal."

As anyone who is familiar with the real estate closing process will instantly recognize, this mischaracterizes the process. Contracts for the purchase of real property virtually always provide for the contract to be receipted at the title company, and for the buyer to then perform inspections and review the title commitment before proceeding with the transaction. This is commonly referred to as the "due diligence" and "title review" period, which is the period during which the buyer is apprised of the facts and makes the purchase decision. To suggest that the transaction is "all but complete" at the time of disclosure of the private transfer fee covenant, when in reality the transaction has only just begun, is a substantive mischaracterization.

The concern itself seems contrived. As discussed, the Coalition to Save Community Benefits estimates that eleven million homes are encumbered by a private transfer. Noting that some legislatures had trouble pushing through restrictive private transfer fee covenant legislation because there have been virtually no constituent complaints regarding the covenants, the Community Association Institute ("CAI") surveyed close to 1,300 communities across the country in an effort to determine the impact of transfer fees on residential properties. The survey concluded that there was no evidence that transfer fee covenants caused any impediment to smooth closings. In 2008, a representative of Lennar Builders said that Lennar has been imposing transfer fees for about five years, and had sold over 25,000 homes with the fees in place, yet could "count on one hand" the number of times a problem with the fees has arisen. In addition, according to a nationwide LEXIS case database search by the author there are no reported cases involving fraud, misrepresentation, or failure to disclose material facts involving developer transfer fee covenants.

So why the uproar? To understand the NAR's perspective one need look no further than a flyer circulated among their members. The flyer refers to a "commission-ectomy", which is described as a real estate agent being asked to absorb the transfer fee at closing. The flyer also refers to the loss of political power that would come from lower commissions. Since both the transfer fee and the real estate commission are typically paid by the seller, they appear on the seller's side of the closing statement. Realtors fear that this proximity will heighten the risk that the seller may ask the Realtor to absorb the fee, thus reducing the commission. Realtors have also reportedly voiced concerns that a lower sales price (made possible by spreading infrastructure costs by means of a private transfer fee) directly translates into a lower commission. Particularly troubling is the following excerpt set out in an internal position briefing paper by the California Association of Realtors, which directly contradicts the public assertion that their opposition has been out of concern for homebuyers:

C.A.R.'s policy is to "OPPOSE" ALL transfer fees. This includes fees that go to the HOA or non-profit, and directly benefit the homebuyer, home and/or development.

As to ALTA, the primary concern appears to be that a title company that fails to perform a proper title search could miss a private transfer fee covenant, which in turn could lead to a claim against the title insurance policy. However, as private transfer fee proponents are quick to point out, any title insurance claim paid as a result of a missed transfer fee would be directly attributable to the title company's own negligence and, moreover, the holders of private transfer fee rights have a vested interest in ensuring that title companies are aware of the fee – otherwise, the fee may not get paid.

Both logic and the available data suggest that the market will adjust the price of real estate to reflect encumbrances of record (including private transfer fees). The primary opponent has conceded that they oppose fees that "directly benefit the homebuyer, home and/or development" because of the potential for a reduced commission. Proponents point out that buyers would benefit from reduced real estate commissions, reduced title insurance premiums, and lower carrying costs, in return for their voluntary agreement to pay a transfer fee at the time of future sale. In light of the foregoing, there appears to be little if any rational basis for banning, and numerous reasons for encouraging, private transfer fees imposed by developers for reasonable periods, in reasonable amounts, in consequence of improvements actually made to real property, and with full disclosure occurring by means of public recording statutes.

Nonetheless, in 2009 the NAR and ALTA began lobbying extensively against the use of private transfer fees. They were savvy enough to conceal their agenda by clothing their argument as "just looking out for homeowners". Having spent close to a half billion dollars on political donations, lobbying and related expenses, the NAR asked for, and received, the support of political bodies at both the federal and state level.

These groups first collided over the issue in 2007, when the California Association of Realtors ("CAR") put forward a "Model Private Transfer Fee Covenant" statute drafted by the NAR and ALTA.

=== 2007 California Battle ===
The NAR/ALTA Model Statute was introduced in the 2007-2008 legislative session as SB 670, and sought to ban the use of all private transfer fees in California. However, builders, real estate developers and non-profits, together with Freehold Capital Partners (widely credited with originating the widespread use of private transfer fees) banded together. News reports, studies and commentary arising from the debate included:

- "You can't put all of the costs on home buyers and still sell at an affordable price." California Building Industry Association.
- "If builders weren't allowed to pass along costs in a transfer fee, they'd have to make up for it by adding thousands of dollars to their homes' initial selling price, shutting out buyers." California Building Industry Association.
- "Home builders ... look at the best way to absorb and spread ... costs and still sell their products. California Building Industry Association.
- "Transfer fees represent an alternative to other financing mechanisms that can affect home affordability." California Building Industry Association.
- "Reconveyance financing ... helps keep home prices low by spreading costs over all beneficiaries of a project." Julie Snyder. Policy Director for non-profit Housing California.
- "REALTORS never complain that a house is too expensive, and that's precisely what happens when builders lump all of their costs into the price of the first home. Why shouldn't the second and third buyers share the costs?" - California Building Industry Association.
- "A bill to ban transfer fees, backed by the California Association of Realtors, was defeated in a Senate committee earlier this month. Private transfer fees, a relatively recent financing tool, are a way to bankroll multimillion dollar development concessions without necessarily affecting a home's initial purchase price." Jim Sanders
- "A bill backed by the Realtors failed to get a single vote. The defeat came at the hands of an alliance between developers and non-profits.

Legislative analysis prepared in connection with SB 670 concluded:

- "...developers have used private transfer fees to purchase open space as environmental mitigation for a project or to support the development of affordable housing and homeless shelters." Senate Staff Analysis (April 17, 2007).
- "To the extent the existence of a [transfer] fee impacts the value of property, as long as the fee is fully disclosed the market will adjust to the fee.") Supra.

California rejected the proposed ban, and instead passed California Civil Code §1098, affirmatively allowing the continued use of private transfer fees.

=== Amendments to the model statute ===
In consequence of the California defeat, widely credited to formidable opposition from non-profits, the Model Statute was re-written to carve out transfer fees payable to non-profits, leaving the debate largely centered on private transfer fee use by builders and real estate developers.

== Federal action ==
=== Congressional action ===
In 2010, Rep. Maxine Waters introduced a bill in Congress to ban private transfer fees at the federal level. A national disclosure bill was introduced in opposition. Both bills died at the end of the then-current session.

=== FHFA ===
At the federal level, the Federal Housing Finance Agency ("FHFA") issued a final rule (codified at 12 C.F.R. Part 1228) regulating Fannie Mae, Freddie Mac and the Federal Home Loan Board banks' purchase of securities backed by mortgages on properties encumbered by certain private transfer fee covenants, as well as securities backed by the income stream from such covenants.

Retrospectively, private transfer fee covenants created prior to February 8, 2011, are expressly grandfathered. In taking the regulatory action the FHFA made clear that its "rule does not prohibit any private transfer fees," and that its "rule regulates neither private transfer fee covenants nor market participants who create or use them." This Rule does not invalidate or prohibit private transfer fee covenants, but rather it regulates the types of mortgage-backed securities that can be held by the regulated entities.

Simply stated, the Final Rule dictates the types of securities that Fannie Mae, Freddie Mac and the Federal Home Loan Board banks can hold. The Final Rule does not prohibit mortgage financing for property buyers, nor does it prohibit or invalidate private transfer fee covenants.

== State action ==
At the state level, 43 states have enacted legislation regulating the use of private transfer fee covenants.

- Alabama (ALA. CODE § 35-4-430)
- Arizona (ARIZ. REV. STAT. § 33-442)
- Arkansas (ARK. CODE § 18-12-107)
- California (CAL. CIV. CODE § 1098)
- Colorado (COLO. REV. STAT. § 38-35-127)
- Connecticut (CONN. GEN. STAT. §47-17A)
- Delaware (DEL. CODE TIT 25, § 319)
- Florida (FLA. STAT. § 689.28)
- Georgia (GA. CODE. ANN. § 44-14-15)
- Hawaii (HAW. REV. STAT. § 502–112)
- Idaho (IDAHO CODE ANN. § 55–3101)
- Illinois (765 ILL. COMP. STAT. § 155)
- Indiana (IND. CODE § 32-21-14)
- Iowa (IOWA CODE § 558.48)
- Kansas (KAN. STAT. ANN. § 58–3821)
- Kentucky (KY. REV. STAT. ANN. § 382–792)
- Louisiana (LA. REV. STAT. § 9:3131)
- Maine (ME. STAT. TIT. § 33-7-163)
- Maryland (MD. CODE, REAL PROP. § 10-708)
- Michigan (MICH. COMP. LAWS § 565.881; 565.891)
- Minnesota (MINN. STAT. § 513.73)
- Mississippi (MISS. CODE ANN. § 89-1-69)
- Missouri (MO. REV. STAT. § 442.558)
- Montana (MONT. CODE ANN. § 70-17-212)
- Nebraska (NEB. REV. STAT. § 76–3107)
- Nevada (NEV. REV. STAT. §111-825)
- New Jersey (N.J. REV. STAT. § 46:3-28)
- New York (N.Y. CONS. LAWS § 15-471)
- North Carolina (N.C. GEN. STAT. § 39A)
- North Dakota (N.D. CENT. CODE §47-33)
- Ohio (OHIO REV. CODE § 5301.057)
- Oklahoma (OKLA. STAT. TIT § 60-350)
- Oregon (OR. REV. STAT. § 93.269)
- Pennsylvania (68 PA. CONS. STAT. §8102)
- Rhode Island (R.I. GEN. LAWS §34-11-42)
- South Carolina (S.C. CODE ANN. §27-1-70)
- South Dakota (S.D. CODIFIED LAWS § 43-4-46)
- Tennessee (TENN. CODE ANN. §66-37-102)
- Texas (TEX. PROP. CODE § 5.201)
- Utah (UTAH CODE § 57-1-46)
- Virginia (VA. CODE ANN. §55-70.2)
- Washington (WASH. REV. CODE §64.60.005)
- Wyoming (WYO. STAT. ANN. §34-28-101)

== Enforceability ==
There are a number of federal and state legal issues related to statutes regulating private transfer fee covenants.

=== Federal preemption ===
A colorable argument exists that state statutes that prohibit private transfer fee covenants are pre-empted by federal law. Although property rights are typically state rights, there is ample precedent for federal preemption of property rights in general, and rights and obligations imposed on real property by means of covenants and deed restrictions in particular.

In the late seventies satellite dishes began to appear with increasing frequency. In response, neighborhood homeowner associations, often backed by state laws, began imposing deed restrictions prohibiting satellite dishes. However, these prohibitions were ultimately held unenforceable on the grounds that the FCC regulated satellite transmissions under the Telecommunications Act of 1934, 1996, thus pre-empting state law. Similarly, it has long been notionally held that property rights extend from the center of the Earth to the periphery of the universe. However, a covenant or deed restriction prohibiting flight above real property, which of necessity would include passing through the aforementioned vertical property boundaries, is pre-empted by the Federal Aviation Administration's authority over airspace.

The Copyright Act of 1976 (the "Act") created a uniform national copyright law. The legislative history of the Act sets out the broad scope: "(a)s long as a work fits within one of the general subject matter categories ... the bill prevents the states from [regulating] it even if it fails to achieve federal statutory copyright because it is too minimal or lacking in originality to qualify, or because it has fallen into the public domain." 17 U.S.C. § 301(a) codifies this federal preemption of state law.

Copyright protection has long been available for architectural drawings, but not to structures built from those drawings. However, all of this changed in 1989, when the United States became a signatory to the Berne Convention, which required the United States to extend copyright protection to constructed buildings. In response, Congress passed the "Architectural Works Copyright Protection Act", expanding the Act to architectural works arising from architectural drawings. The protection extends to "buildings", which the Copyright Office defines as "humanly habitable structures that are intended to be both permanent and stationary, such as houses and office buildings, and other permanent and stationary structures designed for human occupancy, including but not limited to churches, museums, gazebos, and garden pavilions". The House Report accompanying the AWCPA states "the term building encompassed habitable structures such as houses and office buildings. It also covers structures that are used, but not inhabited, by human beings, such as churches, pergolas, gazebos, and garden pavilions." Specifically prohibited from protection are "structures other than buildings, such as bridges, cloverleafs, dams, walkways, tents, recreational vehicles, mobile homes, and boats." Since passage of the Architectural Works Copyright Protection Act in 1990, Courts have routinely protected structures that possess the minimal amount of originality that copyright requires. The requirement is indeed minimal, and can consist of common elements bundled together.

The AWCPA has potentially significant implications for private transfer fee covenants. The design and construction of a master planned community, an office building, and many other forms of horizontal and vertical improvements to real property may give rise to two distinct forms of copyright protection regulated by federal law: one for the drawings and, in consequence of the AWCPA, one for the work constructed from the drawings. This protection lasts for the life of the creator plus 70 years, a term that ordinarily pushes well beyond the typical private transfer fee covenant term of 99 years. If a court were to conclude that a private transfer fee statute presented an obstacle to the accomplishment and execution of the full purpose and objective of the AWCPA, the private transfer fee statute would be "without effect".

Freehold Capital Partners ("Freehold") is reportedly the largest originator and owner of private transfer fee rights in the world. In explaining the appeal to developers, Freehold emphasized that the ability to spread infrastructure costs would allow the developer to lower the sales price, which in turn would lead to lower acquisition and carrying costs for consumers. However, Freehold also emphasized a private transfer fee as a way to compensate developers for their creative work. Freehold's contention is not only spelled out in its literature, but the premise was incorporated into Freehold's private transfer fee covenants.

The private transfer fee covenants used by Freehold refer to the "licensing" of intellectual property as well as the developer's creative work that benefits the land and the property, both of which independently underpin the fee. Publicly, even private transfer fee critics have referred to the Freehold private transfer fee as a "royalty" on the creative process involved in designing and building a master planned community – an approach that seems squarely within the scope of the Berne Convention and the AWCPA.

A court faced with the issue of whether or not existing transfer fee statutes effectively put obstacles between a copyright holder's right to recompense for their work, by means of a fee payable by those who will use and benefit from the protected work, might well answer in the affirmative. If so, the various state laws, including the common law, would be "without effect" to the extent they impaired or regulated works covered by the AWCPA. As noted, this would apply to creative works notwithstanding the absence of a formal grant of copyright.

=== Equal Protection Issues ===
The Fourteenth Amendment's Equal Protection Clause "requires that all persons similarly situated . . . be treated alike." However, in the absence of abridgment of a fundamental right or a suspect classification, States have wide discretion to pass legislation that provides for disparate treatment, provided that there is a rational relationship between the disparate treatment and a legitimate government objective.

The "rational basis" test was first raised in the influential 1893 article, "The Origin and Scope of American Constitutional Law" by James Bradley Thayer, a professor of law at Harvard University, and is now widely used to review newly enacted statutes. Under a rational basis review (sometimes referred to as "traditional" review) the court seeks to determine (1) whether or not a law is related to a legitimate government objective and, if so, (2) whether or not the stated objective is achieved. A disparate classification will stand unless it is shown to be essentially arbitrary and wholly unrelated in a rational way to the objective of the statute.

Although differences between two groups subject to disparate treatment may exist, "mere difference is not enough." The State may not rely on a classification whose relationship to an asserted goal is so attenuated as to render the distinction arbitrary or irrational." Instead, the difference must "hav[e] a fair and substantial relation to the object of the legislation", and there must be a "reasonably conceivable set of facts" justifying the disparate treatment. "Reasonably conceivable" does not mean illusory. The fundamental guaranties of the Constitution cannot be freely submerged if and whenever some ostensible justification is advanced and the police power invoked. Instead, whenever the basis for a statute is illusory, unreasonable, capricious, or a speculative experiment, the statute will be set aside.

In challenging the constitutionality of a statute under the rational basis standard of review, the plaintiff has the heavy burden of showing that "the legislative facts on which the classification is apparently based could not reasonably be conceived to be true by the governmental decisionmaker." Further, "[a]lthough parties challenging legislation under the Equal Protection Clause may introduce evidence supporting their claim that it is irrational, ... they cannot prevail so long as 'it is evident from all the considerations presented to [the legislature], and those of which we may take judicial notice, that the question is at least debatable.'" The Equal Protection hurdle is thus a high one for challengers.

In enacting private transfer fee statutes many legislatures included prefatory statements to the effect that the basis of the legislation was that a private transfer fee constituted an "unreasonable restraint on alienation", "regardless of the amount or duration of the fee". The statutes then proceeded to carve out designated parties who could in fact charge a transfer fee.

First, a court could find that the prefatory statements provide an insufficient rationale basis for the legislation. An unreasonable restraint on alienation occurs when a clause or provision is recorded against title to real property that purports to prohibit the owner of the property from selling or otherwise transferring his interest in the property in such a way as to significantly reduce the pool of potential buyers, thus impairing the general marketability of the property. A well-known example is the fee tail (e.g. "only the direct lineal descendants of John Doe can own this property.") Such direct restraints on alienation are generally void. However, not all restraints on alienation are prohibited. Instead, the restraint must be unreasonable (e.g. rise to a level sufficient to significantly diminish the pool of prospective buyers to the point where marketability is materially impaired.). As such, a state could be hard pressed to defend how a one dollar transfer fee, paid once, creates an unreasonable restraint on alienation, yet this is the premise advanced by the state in declaring the restraint occurs "regardless of the amount or duration of the fee". Importantly, and dispositively, a private transfer fee covenant, like all real property covenants, is an encumbrance associated with, but not a direct restraint on, conveyance of title to the property. An encumbrance is defined as "a claim (as a lien) against property ... that may diminish the value of the estate but does not prevent the conveyance of the estate." Stated another way, while a private transfer fee does "diminish the value", the private transfer fee itself does not act as a direct restraint on alienation of the fee simple estate to any degree, much less to the required "unreasonable" degree, because a private transfer fee covenant does not prohibit the conveyance.

In Schodowski v. Tellico Prop. Owners Assoc. (2016) the Tennessee Court of Appeals (Knoxville) considered plaintiff's claim that an excessive HOA fee was so outrageous as to constitute an unreasonable restraint on alienation. In finding plaintiff's claims "unpersuasive" the Court noted that the plaintiff could "cite no authority for the proposition that annual assessment fees charged by a homeowners' association, of which the lot owner had notice at the time of purchase, constitute an unreasonable restraint on alienation." The Court pointed with approval to the Restatement approach, to–wit: ("[an] otherwise valid servitude is valid even if it indirectly restrains alienation by ... reducing the amount realizable by the owner on sale or other transfer of the property, or by otherwise reducing the value of the property.") The Schodowski Court summarized its findings by observing that buying property subject to a covenant is, in essence, entering into a contract, noting that the Tennessee Supreme Court had held that:

Contract law in Tennessee plainly reflects the public policy allowing competent parties to strike their own bargains. Courts do not concern themselves with the wisdom or folly of a contract, and they cannot countenance disregarding contractual provisions simply because a party later finds the contract to be unwise or unsatisfactory.

The Schodowski Court upheld the trial court's determination that "because Plaintiffs knew at the time they purchased the lot that they were bound by the Declaration and its required annual assessments, the assessments were 'a matter of contract' and plaintiff could not now claim that this contract was a restraint on alienability."

Even if the private transfer fee encumbrance were a direct restraint, it seems unlikely that a court would find the premise "regardless of the amount or duration of the fee" (e.g. a one dollar fee, paid once) to be a credible restraint. In theory a private transfer fee could have such a chilling effect as to act as a direct restraint de facto, if not de jure (e.g. a $1 million private transfer fee imposed on a $200,000.00 home.) Despite being an indirect restraint, such a fee would nonetheless be void, but not because the fee constituted an unreasonable restraint on alienation, but rather because the fee provision would be unconscionable. Regardless, the legislative foundation articulated (that a transfer fee is a restraint regardless of the amount or duration of the fee) establishes an inadequate foundation for the respective statutes.

Second, a state facing a challenge to the statute might be hard pressed to articulate why the purported restraint on alienation is lessened by who gets the money, a disparate classification that seems particularly weak when one considers that a homeowner paying a transfer fee to a homeowner's association is, at the time the fee is paid, selling the property, which seemingly undermines any argument that a fee paid by the selling homeowner somehow inures back to the benefit of that particular homeowner.

Each statute, having first declared a transfer fee to be an unreasonable restraint on alienation, regardless of the amount or duration of the fee, but then designating certain special groups who are authorized to assess and collect transfer fees, then directly restrains alienation of that same property interest granted by the statute.

As a "permissible" owner of private transfer fees created after the date of the statute, homeowner's associations and non-profits can own private transfer fee rights. However, if these groups seek to sell (or "alienate") their property right, for example, to make capital improvements today, they can only sell their valuable interest to another "permissible" entity. By substantially reducing the prospective pool of buyers that would otherwise be available to acquire this property right, the statute accomplishes the exact opposite of its stated goal: it recognizes a property right, and then directly restrains alienability of that right, by virtually eliminating any credible pool of potential buyers, which is textbook unlawful.

As such, a court could conclude that the statutory carve outs, which allow payments to be assessed in favor of use by one class, but not by another, and with no distinction in the burden placed on the payor, and which rests entirely on a flawed premise, is "so attenuated as to render the distinction arbitrary and irrational," particularly when, as seems to be the case with private transfer fee legislation, the legislation appears to have been motivated more by political considerations than public considerations. As the Supreme Court stated in W. Va. State Bd. of Educ. v. Barnette, the purpose of constitutional rights is "to withdraw certain subjects from the vicissitudes of political controversy, to place them beyond the reach of majorities and officials and to establish them as legal principles to be applied by the courts".

=== Takings Clause ===
The Fifth Amendment's Takings Clause, applied to the States through the Fourteenth Amendment, prevents a State, other governmental entity, or regulatory agency, from depriving citizens of vested property rights except for a "public use" in connection with a legitimate governmental interest, and then only upon payment of "just compensation." The Takings Clause "does not prohibit the taking of private property, but instead places a condition on the exercise of that power." It "is designed not to limit the governmental interference with property rights per se, but rather to secure compensation in the event of otherwise proper interference amounting to a taking." A property regulation must "substantially advance" a legitimate governmental interest to pass constitutional muster. The "substantial advancement" requirement examines the nexus between the effect of the ordinance and the legitimate state interest it is supposed to advance. This requirement is not, however, equivalent to the "rational basis" standard applied to due process and equal protection claims.

The Takings Clause applies to every species of right and interest that is the subject of ownership, corporeal, or incorporeal, tangible or intangible, real or personal, and includes any interest that has an exchangeable value or that goes to make up wealth or estate. In 2015 the Supreme Court confirmed that the taking of personal property is subject to the same level of scrutiny as a taking of real property. Vested contract rights are property, whether the obligor be a private individual, a municipality, a state, or the United States. A number of states have even adopted state constitutional provisions clarifying that a taking occurs when property is not only taken directly, but where the property interest is "damaged".

A taking can occur when the majority (acting through the political body) changes the rules in such a way that vested rights are diminished, impaired or destroyed by government act. This premise - that citizens should be able to rely in good faith on the law in effect at the time, and that it is highly inequitable and unjust to destroy the rights he has acquired - arose from federalist concerns over a tyrannical majority.

In Mahon, Justice Holmes opined that "while property may be regulated to a certain extent, if regulation goes too far it will be recognized as a taking." Generally speaking, the question is "how far is too far." However, when a regulation deprives an owner of all economic value of property the answer is clear: a "per se" taking has occurred.

Vested rights impaired or destroyed by a change in the rules is lawful if the law substantially advances a legitimate government interest. However, absent certain exigent circumstances (such as government action undertaken during a fire, flood or similar emergency) compensation is generally required. A law that fails to substantially advance a legitimate government interest can also effectuate an unconstitutional taking in violation of the Fifth and Fourteenth Amendments, but the absence of a legitimate government interest advanced by the law often results in the law being rendered "without effect".

The threshold inquiry for a takings claim is whether the private party affected has some protectable legal interest that existed prior to the rules being changed. If so, under the revised guidance and clarification set out by the Supreme Court in 2005 "a plaintiff seeking to challenge a government regulation as an uncompensated taking of private property may then proceed under one of four theories — [1] by alleging a 'physical' taking, [2] a Lucas-type 'total regulatory taking,' [3] a Penn Central taking or [4] a land-use exaction violating the standards set forth in Nollan and Dolan." This "does not foreclose the possibility that a regulation might be so arbitrary or irrational as to violate due process."

Rights arising from a private transfer fee covenant represent an incorporeal right, consisting of a non-possessory real property interest of distinct worth. A private transfer fee covenant typically consists of both contract rights as well as "property interests" that are to be "treated like other property rights". Condemnation actions related to covenants have required compensation. In Hartford, the Connecticut Supreme Court held that an equitable servitude "constitutes property in the constitutional sense and must be compensated for if taken." The Hartford Court stated that "owners of such property interest cannot maintain proceedings for damages against the original owner or enforce the restrictions against the condemnor, but they are entitled to an award of compensation..."

A statute or regulation, the effect of which is to void a private transfer fee covenant that was otherwise lawful at the time the regulation was passed, and which destroys all economic value of that property, would likely constitute a taking, entitling the private transfer fee covenant owner to compensation. Virtually all of the States that passed private transfer fee covenant laws appear to have recognized the danger and, in consequence, imposed prohibitions on a prospective basis only - preventing the filing of new private transfer fee covenants while grandfathering covenants then in existence. However, many of the statutes appear to skirt dangerously close too, if not cross altogether, the line between legitimate exercise of police power and a taking. If a transfer fee statute is ultimately adjudicated as having gone "too far", destroyed vested rights, or deprived a private transfer fee covenant owner of all economic value (e.g. a per se taking), the owner of private transfer fee covenant rights will be entitled to compensation.

=== Due Process ===
As is often the case when legislative bodies adopt "model bills" drafted entirely by special interests, Constitutional flaws can surface. Thirteen states passed statutes that allow a property owner to void a transfer fee covenant by filing an affidavit in the real property records attesting that the covenant-holder either did not respond to a request for a written statement of the amounts due, or accept a payment, within 30 days. However, this has every indication of being a denial of due process.

The Fifth Amendment to the United States Constitution states that "[n]o person shall ... be deprived of ... property, without due process of law." Numerous state constitutions also include "due process" protections. Due Process review requires a two-step analysis. First, was a person deprived of a constitutionally-protected interest in life, liberty, or property. If so, the court then determines what process he was due with respect to that deprivation.

For the reasons discussed above, regardless of whether viewed as a real property interest or a contract right, private transfer fee covenants represent property. This satisfies the first prong of a due process analysis. Having determined that a property interest is at stake, due process requires that the property owner receive both notice and an opportunity to be heard before a permanent deprivation of his property interest can occur.

As a property interest, a private transfer fee covenant would be subject to in rem jurisdiction. Courts have jurisdiction to settle in rem claims and controversies related to property located within the State. Under prior case law, courts could obtain in rem jurisdiction over nonresidents through constructive service of process. Modernly, notice must be given in a manner that actually notifies the person being sought or that has a reasonable certainty of resulting in such notice.

As such, there is little doubt that statutes that provides for termination of a private transfer fee covenant by means of an affidavit filed by a property owner, without notice or a meaningful opportunity to be heard before a permanent deprivation of property rights occur, are patently inconsistent with due process are in all probability unconstitutional, and present serious pitfalls for title practitioners and purchasers of real property subject who rely on such an affidavit.

=== Contracts Clause ===
Article I, Section 10 of the Constitution provides that "No State shall ... pass ... any law impairing the obligation of contracts." This is a direct prohibition on the enactment of state laws that have a retroactive effect to impair the obligations and rights arising under contracts entered into prior to the enactment of such state laws."

"But contract obligations may be impaired by subsequent state statutes enacted in the reasonable and bona fide exercise of the police power of the states and such impairment of contract obligations will not be held violative of the 'contract clause' of the Federal Constitution." "This power, which in its various ramifications is known as the police power, is an exercise of the sovereign right of the government to protect the lives, health, morals, comfort and general welfare of the people, and is paramount to any rights under contracts between individuals. ... In other words, parties by entering into contracts may not estop the legislature from enacting laws intended for the public good." "Of course, it must be constantly remembered, that even the police power is restricted by the fourteenth amendment, which prohibits the states from taking property without due process of law. And any law impairing the obligation of contracts will not be upheld under the guise of police power, unless it be an actual, bona fide and reasonable exercise of that great sovereign power."

While the legislature may not impair the obligation of contracts or impair or divest vested rights, it may validly make any change in an established method of procedure, provided, however, that the procedure substituted therefor, be as effective or "efficacious" as the original procedure. The courts postulate this power on the broad ground that such laws affect only the remedy, not the right, and that there can be no vested rights in a mere remedy or form of procedure by which rights are enforced. But the power of the legislature to alter or change the remedy is subject to the above limitation, to–wit: that the remedy or form of procedure substituted must be as broad and efficient as the first remedy or form of procedure. The legislature cannot change the remedy if it be in effect to destroy the right.

In Energy Reserves Group v. Kansas Power & Light the Supreme Court spelled out a three-part "Rational Basis" style analysis for scrutinizing whether or not a law runs afoul of the Contract Clause.

First, the regulation must not substantially impair a contractual relationship. However, a significant defect in many private transfer fee covenant statutes is a provision for property owners to discharge a private transfer fee covenant, (and the owner's liability for an unpaid private transfer fee covenant) merely by filing an affidavit alleging lack of response to a notice, yet neither due process (which requires notice and an opportunity to be heard) nor an adequate remedy for restoring the lost asset, is afforded private transfer fee covenant holders. This type of regulatory over-reaching has been tried, and denied.

Second, the State "must have a significant and legitimate purpose behind the regulation, such as the remedying of a broad and general social or economic problem." As discussed in subsection "H" (infra) and otherwise herein, the stated purpose behind most state statutes (unreasonable restraint on alienation) is inadequate as a matter of law.

Third, the law must be reasonable, appropriately tailored to its purpose, and achieve its objective. As discussed in subsection "H" (infra) and otherwise herein, private transfer fee covenants largely fail to effectuate their stated purpose of reducing or eliminating unreasonable restraints on alienation.

As such, a state statute that invalidates private transfer fee covenants which were both in existence and enforceable under the law at the time of creation would likely run afoul of the Contact Clause.

=== Touch and Concern ===
While affirmative covenants to pay money historically violated the touch and concern doctrine, as long as the servitude is "beneficial to the owner of the land whoever it might be, reasonably relates to the property, is legally justified, and concerns the property", it will be enforced, even when the servitude is an affirmative covenant centered around an obligation to pay money. Notwithstanding the general trend towards abandonment of "touch and concern" in favor of the "contract approach with disclosure" few things appear to "touch and concern" the land more directly than on-site infrastructure and improvements, without which a typical residential community would be of significantly diminished value.

This is not to suggest that an affirmative covenant that has no reasonable connection to the land will be enforced. To the contrary, such covenants have been routinely struck down. However, the connection need only be reasonably discernible, with anything more than a scintilla generally sufficing. In Hartford National Bank, a trust provided money for the purchase of land, contingent on the purchaser covenanting not to develop the land in a manner prohibited by the terms of the trust. The court recognized it to be a valid and enforceable covenant running with the land, despite creating a benefit not tied to ownership of land.

A common example of an affirmative covenant that "touches and concerns" the land is a transfer fee payable to a community association. These have routinely been found to touch and concern the burdened land because the affirmative obligation to pay money has a reasonable nexus to a benefit conferred upon the burdened land. The rationale is that HOA transfer fees directly or indirectly can pay for the construction and maintenance of roads, parks, and common areas and facilities which community owners use and benefit from. Similarly, developer private transfer fees are assessed in return for these same amenities, which of course are used by, and inure to the benefit of, the property owners. The fact that an HOA is arguably using the funds on an ongoing basis, whereas a developer private transfer fee is used to reimburse the developer for costs already incurred, is a distinction of little import, particularly when courts have routinely upheld HOA transfer fees without any necessity of showing the use of proceeds. Instead, courts have primarily looked for some type of rational basis for the fee, and notice to prospective purchasers.

In Neponsit Property Owners' Association, Inc. v. Emigrant Industrial Savings Bank, 15 N.E.2d 793, 797 (N.Y. 1938), for example, the court considered whether a covenant touched and concerned the land when the covenant created an obligation to pay a sum of money devoted to maintenance and other public purposes. The property owners paid the fee to the homeowners' association. The Court agreed that "a covenant to pay a sum of money is a personal affirmative covenant which usually does not touch or concern the land." Nonetheless, the court reasoned that property owners gained access to public roads, beaches, and public parks, and public places. Therefore, "the burden of paying the cost should be inseparably attached to the land which enjoys the benefit."

Opponents first argued that developer transfer fees do not "touch and concern" the land. The benefit (infrastructure used by homeowners on an ongoing basis) appears directly and reasonably related to the burden (payment of the fee). The touch and concern analysis (in jurisdictions that still apply it) would however defeat mere obligations to pay money where the obligation has not even a scintilla of a connection to the land. (e.g. a homeowner encumbering their land with a future fee generated for the purpose of providing inheritance payments to heirs, etc.).

Since Neponsit, courts around the country have found affirmative covenants enforceable. In Nickerson v. Green Valley Recreation, Inc., 265 P.3d 1108 (Ariz. App. 2011), the Arizona Court of Appeals considered the enforceability of an affirmative covenant to pay homeowner fees to support common facilities and recreational amenities. The plaintiffs argued that they were outlying homeowners, that the servitude supporting the subject facilities and recreational amenities did "not improve or increase the value of [plaintiffs' outlying] land ... nor does it benefit the new owner after a sale since it increases costs and provides a service that the homeowner can obtain elsewhere." The trial court validated the affirmative covenant. On appeal, the plaintiffs argued that the trial court's ruling was improper because the court, "after reviewing a section of the Restatement[,] ... deemed the 'touch and concern doctrine' to be obsolete." The defendant HOA responded that the trial court properly found that the servitude does touch and concern the land because it benefits the plaintiffs' properties and suggested that the touch and concern requirement for determining whether a servitude runs with the land no longer applies in Arizona. In support of its argument that the touch and concern element no longer applied, the defendant referred not only to the Restatement (Third) of Property (Servitudes) §§ 2.1, 3.1, 3.7 (2000), which dispenses with the touch and concern element as obsolete, but also to the Arizona legislature's enactment in 2010 of Ariz. Rev. Stat. § 33-440 [the private transfer fee covenant statute], which relates to the enforceability of private transfer fee covenants and appears to abandon the touch and concern element. The Court noted that in Ariz. Rev. Stat. § 33-442, also enacted in 2010 and which generally prohibits and renders unenforceable the assessment of fees in connection with the transfer of property, "the legislature expressly exempted fees imposed for the purpose of supporting recreational facilities, with no requirement that the servitude further touch and concern the land in order to be valid. § 33-442(C)(7)." Although the Court noted that "these [private transfer fee covenant] statutes call into question the continued applicability of the touch-and-concern doctrine in Arizona," the Court did not rely on the statutes because the covenants in question were executed before the statutes' effective dates.

The Court further did not apply and consider the application of the Restatement rule, "because under the rule expressed in Choisser and Federoff, we conclude the GVR covenants do touch and concern the land." In finding that the GVR covenants touch and concern the plaintiffs' land, the Court noted that under Arizona's touch and concern analysis, the property must receive a benefit from the affirmative covenant that makes it more useful or valuable to the benefited party. Applying this standard, the Court found the GVR covenant to touch and concern the land because each burdened property owner is entitled to the use and benefit of the facilities and services for recreational activities, the recreational association provides full membership opportunities and rights for persons owning property in its vicinity, and the existence of a common scheme of development for burdened properties appears inconsequential as long as access to a facility is not unreasonably impeded by distance or some other factor. The Court also criticized the plaintiffs view of "benefit" and "value" as too subjective, noting that while "GVR membership may not be regarded as valuable by all people, nothing in the record suggests it is utterly lacking in intrinsic value; indeed, the opposite is more likely the case."

The Court's line of reasoning mirrors that of other jurisdictions, which is that the "benefit" can be widely construed. This casts a net that should be more than sufficient to encapsulate traditional private transfer fee covenants. Nonetheless, a properly prepared private transfer fee covenant will set out the benefits, as well as an owner's acknowledgement of same, generally accomplished by means of acceptance of title to the property.

However, even where a private transfer fee covenant is found to not run at law, as long as it meets certain requirements (e.g. the Statute of Frauds) it will often be allowed to run in equity, thus allowing enforcement under equitable principals. "Alongside the legal rules governing whether the restrictive covenants in the present case run with the land, long-standing equitable principles applicable to restrictive covenants provide an important, and independent, framework for determining whether the covenants' burdens may be enforced as a matter of equity." "Therefore, under the rules of equity, if the plaintiff took the property in question with notice that it is burdened by restrictive covenants, it may be bound in equity to those burdens, regardless of whether the burdens run with the land."
