= Privity of estate =

Privity of estate is a mutual or successive legal relationship to the same right in real property, such as the relationship between a landlord and tenant. Thus, privity of estate refers to the legal relationship that two parties bear when their estates constitute one estate in law.

Privity of estate involves rights and duties that run with the land if original parties intend to bind successors, and the rights touch and concern the land. Privity of estate traces the land of claimant and defendant back to a common owner, who imposed the restriction on the land's use. That is referred to as "vertical privity".

Within the context of a landlord-tenant relationship, tenant generally cannot transfer the tenancy or privity of estate between himself and his landlord without the landlord's consent. An assignee who comes into privity of estate is liable only while he continues to be the legal assignee: while he is in possession under the assignment.

== See also ==
- Privity of contract
