= Rentcharge =

In English law, payment by a freeholder

In English land law, a rentcharge is an annual sum paid by the owner of freehold land (terre-tenant) to the owner of the rentcharge (rentcharger), a person who need have no other legal interest in the land.

They are often known as chief rents in the north west of England but the term ground rent is used in many parts of the country to refer to either a rentcharge or a rent payable on leasehold land. This is confusing because a true ground rent is a sum payable in relation to land held under a lease rather than freehold land. As a result, the first question a conveyancer or other adviser, such as the free Rentcharges Unit, will demand is information from the Land Registry, which the public can also obtain cheaply, as to whether the subjected land is freehold or held on a lease (a leasehold estate).

== History ==
Rentcharge is a legal device which permitted an annual payment to be continually levied on a freehold property. A deed made with the parties' knowledge is legally effective against land to effect this and has been lawful since the 1290 Statute of Quia Emptores (18 Edw. 1). Such sums were originally payable to the local lord of the manor in perpetuity; however, a more common system of such lords was copyhold.

== Function ==
Rentcharges provided a regular income for landowners who were prepared to release land for development, to the original builder, or in some cases a third party. The payments due are typically between £2 and £5 per annum, which are no longer a significant burden due to past price inflation. Sometimes the land was released without a capital sum being paid with the rentcharge being the only payment. Once imposed, a rentcharge continues to bind all the land even when the land is later divided and sold off in plots. In such cases one terre-tenant can be made responsible for paying the whole rent. That person is then left to collect the appropriate portion from the other terre-tenants whose land is subject to the rentcharge.

== Rentcharges Act 1977 ==
Rentcharges Act 1977 (Note: Section 18(1).)
- Act of Parliament
- Parliament of the United Kingdom
- Long title: An Act to prohibit the creation, and provide for the extinguishment, apportionment and redemption, of certain rentcharges.
- Citation: 1977 c. 30
- Territorial extent: England and Wales (Note: Section 18(3).)

Dates
- Royal assent: 22 July 1977
- Commencement: 1 February 1978 (Note: Section 18(2). The Rentcharges Act 1977 (Commencement) Order 1978 (SI 1978/15).)
Other legislation
Amends	Land Settlement (Facilities) Act 1919; Landlord and Tenant Act 1927
Amended by	Statute Law (Repeals) Act 2004

Status: Amended

Text of statute as originally enacted

Revised text of statute as amended

Text of the Rentcharges Act 1977 as in force today (including any amendments) within the United Kingdom, from legislation.gov.uk.

Section 2 of the Rentcharges Act 1977 (c. 30) prohibits the creation of most new rentcharges except for 'estate rentcharges' (those for communal/own-property benefit).

Other parts of the Rentcharges Act 1977 will abolish rentcharges of a feudal nature and provide a financial means to extinguish (way to redeem) any, regarding any freehold, by the freeholder, with or without the free assistance of the Rentcharges Unit of the Ministry of Housing, Communities and Local Government, Birkenhead, in the meantime.

Rentcharges (Redemption Price) (England) Regulations 2016
- Statutory Instrument
- Parliament of the United Kingdom
- Citation: SI 2016/870
- Territorial extent: England

Dates
- Made: 5 September 2016
- Laid before Parliament: 7 September 2016
- Commencement: 1 October 2016
Other legislation
Made under	Rentcharges Act 1977

Status: Current legislation

Text of the Rentcharges (Redemption Price) (England) Regulations 2016 as in force today (including any amendments) within the United Kingdom, from legislation.gov.uk.

Any to be redeemed (ended) by the freeholder owning land subject to such a rentcharge, work out to as of 2023 very roughly 10 to 11 times (based on a capitalisation rate of 4.6%) the annual rentcharge set out in the property's title, specifically per the act's formula. The act has an optional procedure, enabled by Rentcharges (Redemption Price) (England) Regulations 2016 (SI 2016/870), in which the government's Rentcharges Unit assist without charge. To be ensured as effective the rentcharge must no longer appear on the subjected freehold's Register of Title.

There is a rare exception to this simple proof. Very few non-agricultural freeholds remain unregistered land and those that do may consider voluntary first registration.

Many rentchargers (owners of rentcharge) can make a private settlement with the freeholder (who is technically a terre-tenant, a rentcharge payer, a mildly incumbranced freeholder until redeemed/rentcharge expires/ends at abolition). The act has a formula which enables Department for Communities and Local Government (DCLG) to calculate the redemption figure that the latter has to pay to redeem their rentcharge.

This is per the Rentcharges (Redemption Price) (England) Regulations 2016:

$P=\frac{R}{Y}-\frac{R}{Y(1+Y)^N}$

P = the redemption price;

R = the annual amount of the rentcharge (or, as the case may be, the rent to which section 20(1) of the Landlord and Tenant Act 1927 applies) to be redeemed;

Y = the maturity rate, expressed as a decimal fraction, of the “over-30-, not over 30.5-year” National Loans Fund interest rate published by the UK Debt Management Office; and

N = the period, expressed in years (rounding up any part of a year to a whole year), for which the rentcharge (or, as the case may be, the rent to which section 20(1) of the Landlord and Tenant Act 1927 applies) would remain payable if it were not redeemed. The point of longstop (longest date for this) will be 22 August 2037, thus longest period is that year minus the current gap in years, rounded up as to any part-year.

Rentcharges are extinguished on 22 August 2037; therefore in mid-2023, their lifetime is 14 years and if input into the formula above and using a yield of 4.6% the rate applicable in mid 2023 gives approximately 10.26 years of the rent to redeem it.

When the transaction has been completed DCLG, on behalf of the Secretary of State, issues a redemption certificate to the terre-tenant. Any existing rentcharges other than estate rentcharges will be extinguished on 22 August 2037.

=== Estate rentcharges ===
The 1977 act retained and continues to allow developers on sale to make appropriate estate rentcharges, those:

- to impose a duty on the registered freehold (and thus freeholder) to perform an enforceable covenant
- to pay for services performed by the rentcharger for the provision of services, maintenance etc. for the benefit of that land ("the land burdened by the rentcharge").

These are, thus, still a means of paying for/requiring desirable upkeep, such as ancillary communal maintenance and shared infrastructure. Within the UK, the regulation surrounding potential abuses (known as "fleecehold") has not kept pace with developments in the housing sector, but the government has consulted on potential reforms.

As to leasehold land (such as flats), ground rent is the equivalent of the feudal-style of rentcharge; service charge is the equivalent of the estate rentcharge.
