= Halsall v Brizell =

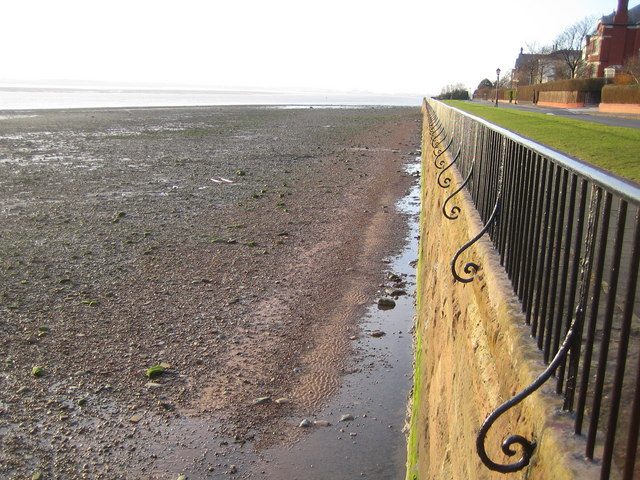
- Court: High Court (Chancery Division)
- Citations: [1957] Ch 169 [1957] 2 WLR 123, ChD

Court membership
- Judge sitting: Upjohn J

Keywords
- Positive covenant

Halsall v Brizell [1957] Ch 169 is an English land law case, concerning the enforceability of a positive covenant, that is required positive obligations, in this case the obligation to pay money for upkeep and repair.

== Facts ==
Homebuyers on a Liverpool estate owned their property enjoying the right (having an easement) to use estate roads, drains, the promenade, and sea walls subject to the obligation to contribute to repair and upkeep. Brizell, a successor of an original purchaser (buyer from the developer), wished to continue to benefit from all of these but claimed he should not need to pay, as payment was a positive covenant.

== Law ==
It was already old law that positive covenants routinely bind successors in leasehold land. Until this case, conflicting decisions pointed to a narrow category of application of positive covenants (chiefly limited to for example the obligation to erect and maintain railings or fences) could bind successors (beyond the first covenantor, that is purchaser or donee) owning freehold land. This decision clarified that positive covenants, such as the responsibility to maintain or repair infrastructure, attached to a right to enjoy and use that infrastructure, can routinely attach to freeholders who choose to use that infrastructure.

== Judgment ==
Mr Justice Upjohn held that Brizell could not claim the benefit of the facilities without having to pay for them. He could not exercise the rights without paying his costs of ensuring that they could be exercised.

== Significance ==
The case was approved by Rhone v Stephens, but also distinguished. Lord Templeman said the following.

In Halsall v Brizell the defendant could, at least in theory, choose between enjoying the right and paying his proportion of the cost or alternatively giving up the right and saving his money. In the present case the owners of Walford House could not in theory or in practice be deprived of the benefit of the mutual rights of support if they failed to repair the roof.

=== Applied in ===
- Tito v Waddell (No 2) [1977] Ch 106 (EWHC before the Vice-Chancellor, the Head of the Chancery Division)
- ER Ives Investment Ltd v High [1967] 2 QB 379 (EWCA)

=== Not applied in ===
- Signature of St Albans (Property) Guernsey Ltd v Wragg [2017] EWHC 2352 (Ch) (distinguishing case law followed)

== See also ==
- English land law
  - Easements in English law
  - Rentcharges
