= Testate succession in South African law =

Testate succession exists under the law of succession in South Africa.

Testamentary succession takes place by virtue of either a will or a codicil:

- A will or testament is a declaration, in proper form, by a person known as the "testator" or "testatrix," as to how and to whom their property is to go after their death.
- A codicil is a second or later will, either annexed to the original will or in a separate document. It is usually employed to supplement and to make alterations to the original will. By virtue of the Wills Act, 1953, a codicil is included within the definition of "will."

The date of execution of a will is the date on which the will is signed. Before 1954, when the Wills Act, 1953 came into force, all provinces had their own legislation regulating the law of testate succession; now the Wills Act, 1953 has uniformed the law in this regard.

When dealing with a will which may have been executed under suspicious circumstances, it is important to investigate whether the testator wanted to execute a will and whether he did so freely.

Once these requirements have been fulfilled, and once it has been established that the formalities have been complied with, the executor is appointed. He has to deal with the general winding-up of the estate.

Adiation and repudiation form the basis of succession, as it is important to know whether a beneficiary adiates or repudiates a benefit before the executor can begin with the final liquidation and distribution of an estate.

== Freedom of testation ==
Freedom of testation is the power a testator has to deal with his property as he desires. A cardinal principle of South African law is that all persons have complete freedom of testation; no person is obliged to bequeath his estate to anyone. A clause in a will, or an agreement which seeks to limit a testator's freedom to dispose of his property on death, is unenforceable.

Freedom of testation is not absolute, however. It is subject to limitations imposed by statute and the common law. While a testator is generally permitted to disinherit his spouse and his children, and is free to impose conditions on beneficiaries regarding how they should enjoy an inheritance, or when a benefit is to vest, there are instances when, as a matter of public policy, the law restrains testators in their exercise of this freedom. The Constitution also has a role to play here.

A testator living under customary law also has freedom of testation regarding customary law property.

=== Limitations ===
While testators in South Africa enjoy a wide freedom of testation, this freedom is subject to certain limitations. These limitations can be divided into statutory and common law limitations and include conditions that interfere with a beneficiary's marital relationship and conditions limiting a beneficiary's freedom of movement. The common law limitations are also entrenched in the Constitution. Certain indirect limitations, such as those imposed by the maintenance of children and the Maintenance of Surviving Spouses Act, 1990, may also be found.

==== Illegal dispositions and those against public policy ====
No effect is given to illegal dispositions. If, for example, the testator leaves money to set up a brothel, no effect will be given to this disposition, since its purpose is an illegal one.

Effect is also not given to those dispositions which are against public policy.

==== Subdivision of agricultural land ====
It was custom that, when Dutch people died, they gave their agricultural land to their sons in equal shares. This led, however, to the fragmentation of farms, which eventually became so small that they were no longer viable. In terms of section 3 of the Subdivision of Agricultural Land Act, 1970, therefore, the testator's capacity to subdivide his land has been limited.

To get around this legislation, a testator may leave the land to a trust or close corporation, and appoint the beneficiaries as beneficiaries of the trust or close corporation in equal shares.

==== Subdivision of mineral rights ====
The subdivision of mineral rights is based on the same principle as the subdivision of agricultural land. Therefore, in terms of section 20 of the Mineral Rights Act, a testator cannot bequest mineral rights in undivided shares to more than one person.

==== Fideicommissum multiplex ====
A fideicommissum occurs

- where a benefit is left to one person (the fiduciary); and
- where, after a period of time or after fulfilment of a condition, the benefit then goes to another person (the fideicommissary).

With regard to movable property, there may be an infinite number of fideicommissaries; this is known as a fideicommissum multiplex. Family heirlooms, for example, are sometimes passed on to the eldest daughter of the testator; when she dies, they are passed on to her oldest daughter; and so on, in perpetuity.

Where, however, there is immovable property that is the subject of a fideicommissum, only two successive fideicommissaries are permitted. If, for example, certain land is left to the eldest son of the testator and, when he dies, on to his eldest son, and upon his death to his eldest son, this is the furthest the property can go in terms of the fideicommissum multiplex. The second fideicommissary may bequeath the land to whomever he wishes.

==== Maintenance of surviving spouse ====
There is no general duty on the testator to leave anything to his surviving spouse. The Maintenance of Surviving Spouses Act, 1990 was passed to provide a remedy for surviving spouses. In terms of section 2 of this Act, the surviving spouse has a claim against the deceased estate for reasonable maintenance until her death or remarriage, provided that she is unable to support herself.

Section 3 of the Act states the factors to be considered in determining the amount of maintenance awarded, in addition to any other factor:

- the amount in the estate of the deceased spouse available for distribution to heirs and legatees;
- the existing and expected means, earning capacity, financial needs and obligations of the survivor;
- the subsistence or duration of the marriage;
- the standard of living of the survivor during the subsistence of the marriage; and
- the age of the survivor at the death of the deceased spouse.

==== Maintenance and education of minor children ====
In terms of the common law, every minor child of a deceased parent has a claim for maintenance and education against the deceased estate. This duty does not cease when the child attains majority; it runs until the child is self-supporting. It is also irrelevant that the child is legitimate or illegitimate.

If there are insufficient funds in the deceased estate to cover the total maintenance and education of minor children, the children will receive a pro rata amount.

The child's right to claim for maintenance and education has preference over all heirs and legatees, and therefore must be determined first.

The duty to support is passed on from the parent to his estate when he dies, and so it cannot be bequeathed.

With regard to the maintenance of parents, there is no law providing for this yet. If, however, the parent of a deceased child can show the need for it, it is possible that such a claim may be successful.

==== Pension funds ====
In terms of the Pension Funds Act, 1956, pension funds do not accrue to the deceased estate. It is the board of trustees of the particular pension fund which decides to whom to allocate the money. (This is usually the spouse or the children depending on the circumstances.) The testator therefore cannot bequeath his pension funds to an heir or legatee.

=== Delegation ===
The testator may also delegate his freedom of testation to a certain extent by conferring the power of appointment upon other persons.

=== Customary law ===
A person living under a system of customary law is free to make a will regarding customary property. The principles regarding power of appointment should, however, be kept in mind in such instances.

== Testamentary capacity ==
In order to make a will, the testator must have testamentary capacity. If he does not have such capacity at the time the will is executed—that is to say, at the time it is signed—the will is void ab initio, and thus is deemed to never have been valid.

The Wills Act, 1953 deals with the formal capacity to make a will. Section 4 of the Wills Act, 1953 states that a person has formal capacity to make a will if he is

- at least sixteen years of age; and,
- at the time of making the will, mentally capable of appreciating the nature and effect of his act. If, however, a person who has been declared mentally defective makes a will during a lucid interval, it is valid.

Testamentary capacity, then, refers to the minimum age and the mental capacity required to make a valid will. The burden of proof in this regard rests on the party alleging formal incapacity. Evidence concerning a testator's mental capabilities is taken into account when determining the validity of a will.

The Master of the High Court will accept without evidence that the will that he receives from the executor was executed with the necessary testamentary capacity. The issue of a testator's testamentary capacity will only arise if someone approaches a court with an application regarding the capacity of the testator to make a will. The Master determines only whether the formal requirements of the will have been met; he does not concern himself with the other formalities regarding capacity.

It is important to distinguish testamentary capacity from the testator's free expression of his will (volition) as well as from freedom of testation.

If the alleged testator is under sixteen years, he is absolutely prohibited from making a will, even with the assistance of a parent or guardian. Such a will is void ab initio and thus cannot be ratified at a later date. If the testator is at least sixteen years, this is one of the few legal undertakings a minor can assume.

Minors who are entitled to make wills may do so without the authority or assistance of their parents or guardians. The common law restriction placed on deaf-mutes and interdicted prodigals from making wills is not part of modern South African law.

Under a system of customary law, people have freedom of testation just like anyone else and also need to comply with the requirements of testamentary capacity.

=== Mental ability of the testator ===
As stated in section 4 of the Wills Act, 1953, the testator must have the requisite mental ability. There is a rebuttable presumption that the testator is competent. Incompetence would result from the will's being executed by a person who suffers from a mental illness or is under the influence of alcohol or drugs (both legal and illegal) at the time of execution, if that person is incapable of understanding the nature and effect of what he is doing. This obviously depends on the circumstances of each case.

=== Undue influence on the testator ===
If there is undue influence exerted on the testator (physical, mental or otherwise), the testator will lack the requisite capacity. The will will be declared invalid.

== Capacity to witness a will ==
Every person of the age of 14 years or more who is not incompetent to give evidence in a court of law is competent to witness a will.

== Formalities for execution of a will ==
A will is a unilateral expression of the wishes of a testator in a legally prescribed manner which determines what must happen to his property after his death. The Wills Act, 1953 defines a will to "include a codicil and any other testamentary writing." The only way in which a testator can make a valid will is by strictly complying with the detailed requirements of section 2(1) of the Wills Act, 1953.

The will must be in writing, so a video will shall not suffice, as it provides no signature, and the potential for fraud is too great. An electronic will—that is, a will stored on a computer hard drive or other data-storage device—may be condoned, although invalid, in terms of section 2(3) of the Wills Act, 1953.

Furthermore, it is not necessary for the date or place of execution to be recorded, but for practical reasons it is recommended: for example, if a series of wills are executed revoking previous ones.

Similar execution requirements apply when the testator amends an existing will by making changes on the will itself. A codicil that amends an existing will must also be made in accordance with the requirements of section 2(1) of the Wills Act, 1953.

=== Requirements for a testamentary disposition ===
The four requirements for a testamentary disposition are

- compliance with statutory formalities (i.e. the Wills Act, 1953);
- a description of the property bequeathed;
- the extent of the interest in the property bequeathed; and
- the identity of the beneficiary.

=== Methods of executing a valid will ===
Accordingly, there are five methods by which the testator may execute a valid will:

1. The testator signs the will in the presence of two witnesses. All three people (the testator and the two witnesses) must be in the same place at the same time, as all three sign the will.
2. The testator acknowledges in the presence of two witnesses his signature previously placed on the will. The testator is merely to acknowledge in the presence of the witnesses that he signed the will earlier, and that the signature on the will is his.
3. Someone else signs on behalf of the testator in the presence of two witnesses and it is certified by a commissioner of oaths. Schedule 1 of the Act contains a certificate which must be completed by a commissioner of oaths stating the identity of the testator and that it is in fact the testator's last will and testament.
4. Someone else signs on behalf of the testator and acknowledges in the presence of two witnesses his signature previously placed on the will which is then certified by a commissioner of oaths. Thus the testator may sign the will himself either before or in the presence of the witnesses, or another person may sign on behalf of the testator either before or in the presence of the witnesses, provided the will is certified by a commissioner of oaths.
5. The testator signs by making a mark in the presence of two witnesses and it is certified by the commissioner of oaths. The testator may make a cross, a thumbprint or any other mark as a "signature." This is actually very common due to the high rates of illiteracy in South Africa.

=== Signing and signature ===
In terms of section 2(1)(a)(i), a will is not valid unless it is signed by the testator or someone else (a proxy) on the testator's behalf. Where a will is signed by a proxy, the latter must do so in the testator's presence and by the testator's direction. For all persons involved in the execution process, a "signature" includes the making of an initial; in the case of the testator, it also includes the making of a mark, such as a cross or a thumbprint, but in that event the will must be certified as set out below.

The will must be signed by the testator or the proxy, or be acknowledged by the testator, and (if applicable) the proxy, in the presence of two or more competent witnesses present at the same time.

The witnesses must attest and sign the will in the presence of the testator and of each other, and, if the will is signed by a proxy, in the presence also of the latter. A witness, unlike a testator, may not sign by making a mark.

If there is more than one page to the will (other than the page on which it ends), the testator or proxy must sign or make a mark on each and every page of the will.

It is unclear from the Act whether witnesses are required to sign on every page or just at the end of the will, as it just says that they must sign the will. It is generally accepted that witnesses are not required to sign every page; they are simply required to sign any page anywhere on the page.

=== Certificate ===
When a testator signs his will with a mark, or by proxy, a certificate from a commissioner of oaths is required, in which the commissioner certifies that he is satisfied as to the identity of the testator, and that the document is the will of the testator. In terms of the Wills Act, 1953, the commissioner must sign anywhere on every page of the will. The certificate must be completed as soon as possible after the will is signed by the testator or the proxy. Should the testator die before the certificate is made or completed, the commissioner must as soon as possible thereafter complete the certificate and sign the will as indicated above. The importance of this requirement was seen in the case of Tshabalala v Tshabalala.

The commissioner of oaths may not act in a dual capacity as witness, for witnesses are required to attest and sign the will in the presence of the commissioner. In these circumstances, therefore, four persons are required to sign in order to validly execute the will: the two witnesses, the testator placing a mark (or person signing on behalf of the testator) and the commissioner. However, there appears to be no reason why an instructing attorney who drafts a will cannot also commission it.

=== Witnesses ===
Two witnesses are required for the valid execution of a will. The witnesses must be at least fourteen years of age—recall that a testator must be at least sixteen to execute his own will—and must be competent to give evidence in a court of law. In terms of section 4A of the Wills Act, 1953, a witness to a will and the witness’ spouse cannot take any benefit under the will. The witnesses are required only to sign the last page.

== Condonation ==
The courts are vested with the power to condone a will that does not comply strictly with the formalities discussed above. In this regard, section 2(3) of the Wills Act, 1953 states that:

if a court is satisfied that a document or the amendment of a document drafted or executed by a person who has died since the drafting or execution thereof, was intended to be his will or an amendment of his will, the court shall order the Master to accept that document, or that document as amended, for the purposes of the Administration of Estates Act, as a will, although it does not comply with all the formalities for the execution or amendment of wills referred to in subsection (1).

In other words, a court may order that a document which has not been executed in strict compliance with the will-making formalities is nevertheless to be treated as if it were a valid will. The court has the power to make an order of validity to avoid frustrating the will of the testator. This does not mean that there is a general discretion vested in the courts to condone non-compliance with formalities. To obtain such an order, it is essential to prove

- that the document was personally drafted by the testator, or personally executed by the testator;
- that the testator has died since the drafting or execution of the document in question; and
- that the testator intended the document to be his will or an amendment thereof.

If the court is of this opinion, it may order the Master to accept the document as the testator's will, even though it does not comply with "all" the required formalities, but the court must be absolutely sure. This power is utilised sparingly.

Although, therefore, an electronic will, stored on a computer hard drive, for example, which has not been printed or executed, is invalid due to the fact that as it is not in writing nor validly executed, it can be saved by section 2(3). In Van der Merwe v Master of the High Court, an appeal was brought to have an unsigned document accepted as the will of the deceased. The court noted that the lack of a signature had never, in terms of section 2(3), been held to be a complete bar to a document being declared a will. The court considered whether the document was drafted by the deceased, and whether the deceased intended it to be his will. The appellant provided proof that the document had been sent to him by the deceased, giving the document an authentic quality. It was not contested that the document still existed and had not been amended or deleted. From the title of the document, the court held it to be clear that the deceased intended the document to be his will. The court upheld the appeal, declaring the will to be valid.

Despite the existence of section 2(3), it remains vital for wills to be properly executed in accordance with the requirements of section 2(1), because the lengthy delays and financial expense involved in obtaining a court order that a defective document be treated as a will can be disastrous for the testator's family. In addition, it may not always be possible to satisfy the requirements for such an order, even when the testator's intentions can be clearly established.

== Invalid wills ==
There are five ways in which a will can be rendered invalid:

1. The will is not executed in compliance with formalities. (This includes incompetence of witnesses.)
2. The witnesses or testator do not have the required capacity or animus testandi at the time of the execution of the will.
3. The testator was unduly influenced, deceived or otherwise forced to make the will (i.e. the will was not made voluntarily).
4. The will is made dependent on a condition which cannot be fulfilled.
5. The will has been revoked.

Improper execution of any one page of a will generally invalidates not only that page but the entire will. However, if the rest of the will is properly executed and contains all the essential matter—that is, the whole of the dispositions of the testator's property—there is authority to suggest that the defective page may be expunged and the properly executed pages treated as the complete and valid will of the testator.

All questions as to the validity of a will must, notwithstanding that the will has been registered by the Master, be determined by the court. If a will is regular on the face of it—that is, if it is apparently in proper form and in compliance with the requirements of the law, and if there is no external sign or mark of any flaw in it—it is presumed to be valid; hence, if it is sought to establish the invalidity of the will, the onus of proving the cause or reason of the invalidity is upon the person endeavouring to set aside the will. This rule as to the onus of proof is applied whether the will is attacked on the ground of non-compliance with the formalities required by law, or of forgery, or of undue influence, or of incapacity of the testator, such as his insanity.

Where an action is brought to have a will declared invalid, the executor and all the beneficiaries under the will must be joined as defendants in the action. Where the facts are not in dispute, and where there is no danger of collusion, an order may be granted by way of application and on affidavit.

=== Revocation ===
When a testator executes a document in accordance with the formalities for a will, the document remains in existence as the testator's will until such time as the testator

- decides to revoke it; or
- manifests this revocatory intention in one of the recognised acts of revocation.

Even a document which does not comply with the execution formalities, but which was intended by the testator to be his will, must be revoked by the testator in one of the recognised ways to avoid the possibility that a court may make an order in terms of section 2(3) directing that the document be accepted as the testator's will.

If the testator intends to revoke his will but does not carry out one of the recognised acts of revocation, a court can make an order in terms of section 2A revoking the will for the testator if there is proof of the testator's revocatory intention, provided that the requirements of section 2A are satisfied.

The requirements for a court to intervene in terms of section 2A are different from those which apply in terms of section 2(3). The issue of whether or not section 2A can be applied in circumstances where the testator revokes a portion of his will and simultaneously introduces new testamentary provisions in place of the revoked provisions is problematic.

==== Right of revocation ====
A testator may revoke his will at any time, even if he has expressly agreed not to do so. There are two exceptions to this rule.

1. The first exception occurs in the case of a joint will, in which the testators have "massed" their property. If, after the death of one of the testators, the survivor has accepted benefits under the joint will, he cannot revoke his portion of the joint will.
2. The other exception arises in the case where certain forms of pacta successoria are embodied in antenuptial contracts. Some of these dispositions may never be revoked even if both husband and wife desire to do so.

==== Manner ====
At common law, the modes of revocation were not altogether clear. Generally, it was agreed that a testator could revoke his will

- by concluding a later will or codicil;
- by destroying the will; or,
- in so far as a legacy in a will is concerned, by ademption.

However, section 2A of the Wills Act, 1953 allows the court to condone an act of revocation if the court is satisfied that the testator intended to revoke his will or part of it, even though the will was not revoked in one of the ways recognised by the common law. It would seem, however, that a will cannot be revoked by virtue of an oral statement made by the testator even if made before a number of witnesses.

===== Later will or codicil =====
A will can be revoked by a subsequent valid will or by a codicil. A codicil is a supplement to a will: a testamentary instrument intended to alter an already executed will. Later wills are obviously the later wills in a series of wills executed by the same person. A valid will loses all legal force and effect—that is, its validity—if it is revoked by the testator before his death. In revoking a previous will, the testator must intend to revoke the previous will; if accidentally done, the revocation is not effective.

A will can also be revoked by an antenuptial contract; likewise, provisions in an antenuptial contract may be revoked by a subsequent will, provided, of course, that the surviving spouse adiates thereunder.

A revocation may be express, by virtue of a clause known as a revocatory clause, or implied from the fact of provisions in the later will being inconsistent with those in the former. When certain dispositions in the two wills are inconsistent with each other, those in the earlier will are revoked. It follows that, if the two wills are entirely inconsistent, the earlier will is completely revoked. Where, however, it is possible to reconcile the provisions in both wills, such reconciliation should be made. A revocation is effected the moment the revoking will is duly executed.

===== Physical or symbolic destruction =====
The physical or symbolic destruction of a will constitutes revocation and renders it invalid. A will may be completely revoked by the testator's destruction of it: for example, by burning it, or by cutting it into pieces, or by defacing it, or by cancelling it, or by erasing his signature—provided that the act is in each case done with the intention of revoking the will. Deletion of an entire will is an act of destruction that constitutes revocation, and is thus governed by the common law, but a deletion of a portion of a will, by and large, amounts to an amendment and consequently has to comply with certain prescribed formalities.

The destruction of a copy of a will does not normally constitute an effective revocation, but the destruction of a duplicate original revokes both it and the other duplicate original (filed usually with a third party). The partial revocation of a will by means of a deletion or alteration is regulated by the Wills Act, 1953.

If, on the death of a person, his original will, or a duplicate original will, cannot be found, but it is proved to have been in his possession, a presumption arises that it was destroyed by the testator with the intention of revoking it. This presumption may, of course, be rebutted: for example,

- by satisfactory evidence that the will has been mislaid or had been inadvertently destroyed; or
- where the testator destroys his will in the mistaken belief that it had been revoked by a later will, and this later will turns out to be invalid;

but not by the fact that a duplicate original of the will is found in the possession of a firm of attorneys.

===== Ademption =====
Ademption arises where the testator leaves a legacy in a will, and thereafter, in his lifetime, voluntarily alienates the subject matter of the legacy, as when Rodney bequeaths a farm to Shaun, and then sells or donates it. If this happens, the legacy is regarded as having been tacitly revoked, or "adeemed," as it has lapsed by ademption.

If, however, the alienation is not voluntary—if, that is, the testator parts with the thing or its possession out of necessity—ademption does not take place. Such would be the case where Rodney is forced to sell the farm to settle a judgment debt.

===== Other means of revocation =====
Section 2A of the Wills Act, 1953 contemplates the revocation of a will by means other than those recognised at common law. The section permits a court to declare a will revoked where the testator has, intending thereby to revoke the will or part thereof,

- made a written indication on his will, or before death caused such indication to be made;
- performed any other act with regard to his will, or before death caused such act to be performed which is apparent from the face of the will; or
- drafted another document, or before death caused such document to be drafted.

The relationship between section 2A and section 2(3) of the Wills Act, 1953 is not altogether clear. It seems inescapable, however, that section 2A must be interpreted against the backdrop of s 2(3).

===== Divorce or annulment of marriage =====
Section 2B of the Wills Act, 1953 states that, if there is an existing will between spouses whose marriage is later dissolved by divorce or annulment, and if either spouse dies within three months of the date of the divorce, no benefit under the will is accorded to the ex-spouse. In other words, if a testator dies within three months after their marriage was dissolved, and the will was executed before the dissolution, the estate will be distributed in accordance with the provisions of the will, but as if the previous spouse had died before the dissolution of the marriage—unless it appears from the will that the testator had intended to benefit the spouse despite the dissolution of their marriage.

The rationale for this rule is to give spouses who divorce a three-month period to change their wills.

==== Exceptions to the general rule that a will can be revoked ====
In ante-nuptial contracts, duly registered in the Deeds Registry, it is possible to include provisions for the devolution of the spouses’ estates. Parties to such a contract may not unilaterally make a will that conflicts with the ante-nuptial contract. If there has been a massing (where a joint will is drawn up between two or more people who mass their estates into one common pool) and the survivor adiates (i.e. accepts the terms of the will), the survivor will receive an interest in the estate, e.g. a usufruct or fideicommissium. When the survivor dies, the property will then devolve. Note that the surviving spouse cannot unilaterally devolve their estate in terms of another will.

==== Revival of a revoked will ====
Although the matter is not free from doubt, the better view is that a will which has been revoked by the testator, but which is actually still in existence, may be revived by the testator by means of a subsequent reviving document, without the necessity of re-executing the original will. In light of the condonation provisions contained in section 2(3) of the Wills Act, 1953, it seems that it is no longer necessary for the will or the reviving document to be properly executed; a court may condone these documents if the requirements of the section are met.

Where, however, the will has been revoked by destruction, it cannot be revived. The revocation of a will which itself revoked an earlier will does not have the effect of reviving the earlier will; to achieve that end, re-execution is necessary.

=== Alteration or variation ===
It is possible to alter or vary a valid will at any time after the will is executed. It is preferable merely to execute an entirely new will, but such an amendment is possible.

==== Amendment by testator ====
A testator may amend a will at any time prior to death. Any limitation of the power to amend is generally unenforceable. In the case of a will executed on or after 1 January 1954, which the testator amended on or after 1 October 1992, the amendment (including a deletion, addition, alteration or interlineation), made after the will is executed, is valid only if

- the amendment is identified by the signature of the testator or of a proxy (who must sign in the testator's presence and by the testator's direction);
- the signature is made by the testator or by a proxy, or is acknowledged by the testator and, if made by a proxy, also by the proxy in the presence of two or more witnesses as set out above;
- the amendment is identified by the signatures of the witnesses in the presence of the testator and of each other, and, if the amendment has been identified by the signature of a proxy, also in the presence of the proxy; and,
- where the amendment is identified by mark, or by the signature of a proxy, a commissioner of oaths certifies on the will that he has satisfied himself as to the identity of the testator and that the amendment has been made by or at the request of the testator.

Section 2(1)(b) of the Wills Act, 1953 states that all the requirements for the execution of a valid will are required also for the execution of a valid amendment. There is a rebuttable presumption in section 2(2) of the Wills Act, 1953 that any amendment to a will take place after the execution of the will.

In all instances where an amendment is identified in the presence of a commissioner, the certificate must be made as soon as possible after the amendment has been identified. If the testator dies after the amendment is identified, but before the commissioner has made the certificate, the commissioner must as soon as possible thereafter make the certificate.

==== Rectification by court ====
The distinction between rectification and alteration:

- Rectification occurs in circumstances where the court corrects any error in the will.
- Alteration occurs where the court alters any provision of the will.

The need for rectification arises when the will does not correctly represent the testator's intention, due to some mistake of the testator or of the person who drafted the will.

The court will rectify a will in the following circumstances:

- where there is a request to correct a clerical error or description (as when, for example, the plot number of the land bequeathed is incorrect);
- where there is a request to delete words or provisions included in error; and
- where there is a request to insert words or provisions excluded in error. This is the most difficult circumstance for the court to pronounce on, as it requires a thorough exploration of the testator's intention.

The court must be satisfied, on a balance of probabilities, that the will does not express the true intention of the testator, and that there is reliable evidence to show what his intention was.

==== Alteration or variation by the court ====
Where the wording of the will clearly and unambiguously reflects the intention of the testator, however, the position is otherwise, for the court will not as a general rule vary the terms of a will which can be carried out and are not illegal or contrary to public policy, unless authorized by statute to do so. The general rule is that the courts are very reluctant to alter a will. Nevertheless, the court does have a discretion, albeit a very limited one, to order a variation in truly exceptional cases, such as where there has been an unforeseen change of circumstances since the death of the testator, rendering the fulfilment of his directions practically impossible or utterly unreasonable, or which "threatens to make a shipwreck of the testator’s intention."

On change in circumstances, and where the execution of the will is impossible or unreasonable, see Ex Parte Sidelsky.

Incorrect assumptions by the testator in this context refer to those regarding his assets and liabilities.

Where strict execution would result in the failure of the bequest or the frustration of the testator's intention, see Ex Parte McDonald.

Where the will is to be altered or varied out of necessity, see Ex Parte Douallier.

Where the will is to be altered or varied because the manner of execution is not possible or would result in serious loss, see Ex Parte Dittmarn.

=== Incorporation by reference ===
Since all the pages of a will must be executed in compliance with the necessary formalities, a testator may not incorporate into a will, by reference, terms of a separate document, whether or not that document has been formally executed. The question of incorporation arises only when the document referred to contains matters that form an integral part of the will. To be complete and effective, a testamentary disposition must identify

- the property bequeathed;
- the extent of the interest bequeathed; and
- the beneficiary.

Where one of these essential matters is left to a separate, unattested document, the disposition fails.

Where, however, the document in question contains merely incidental matters, it is not an essential part of the disposition or the will; the question of incorporation does not arise at all. Such a document may nonetheless be referred to as part of the "surrounding circumstances" in order to construe or apply the terms of the will. The effect of section 2(3) of the Wills Act, 1953, dealing with condonation (discussed above), on the incorporation-by-reference rule is open to discussion.

== Obsolete and provincial wills ==
Prior to 1954, wills were regulated by a number of provincial statutes in addition to the common law. The law prior to 1954 is still relevant to wills executed before that date.

A remnant of the common law, in the form of the soldier's will, survived until 1992, when it was rendered obsolete by the Law of Succession Amendment Act, 1992.

== Joint or mutual wills ==
A will may be executed in one document by two persons, in which case it is termed a joint or mutual will. The two persons are usually spouses married in community of property, but they may be spouses married out of community, or may not be married to each other, as in the case of two sisters.

No additional formalities or witnesses are required for the execution of a mutual will. Where, however, the will confers reciprocal benefits on the testators, it is advisable that the will be not written by either of them: If the writer is the survivor, the rule applies that a person can take no benefit under a will written by himself. For the survivor to benefit under the will in such a case, either a court must condone the will, or there must be proof of confirmation of the disposition by the first-dying, either by his writing on the will or by other satisfactory evidence.

Notwithstanding its form, a joint will is simply two separate wills embodied for convenience in one document. Usually the dispositions by each testator relate to their own property, or where the testators are married in community of property, to their half share of the joint property: for example, where each of the testators appoints the other as heir, or as heir together with the children of the marriage.

Sometimes, again, a joint will is in fact the will of the first-dying only: for example, where the will appoints the survivor of the testators as sole heir of the first-dying, or as heir together with the children. In these cases, the portion of the will relating to the dispositions by the first-dying is not binding on the survivor, and the latter may revoke their portion of the will. But if, in addition, there is a disposition of the joint estate of the testators, or of a portion of it, giving the survivor a limited interest in the property, and disposing of such property after their death to other persons, the will is said to effect a "massing" of the estate, and is binding on the survivor accepting any benefits under the disposition.

== Probate of wills ==
Every person who is in possession of a will of a deceased must send the will to the Master, who registers it in a register of estates. This registration is termed "granting probate of the will."

=== Lost wills ===
Where a will has been lost or destroyed, but a copy or draft is in existence, the court, if satisfied that the testator did not intend to revoke the will, may authorise the Master to grant probate of it.

If no copy of the will is available, its contents may be proved by oral evidence, provided that such evidence is very clear and specific. Where, therefore, it was proved that a husband and wife had signed a joint will which was left with their attorney for safe keeping, and that, after the death of the husband, the will could not be found (the probabilities being that the will had been lost or destroyed in the attorney's office and not removed by either of the testators), the court held that the will was valid; it adopted a reconstructed will.

== Content of wills ==
A South African testator has almost unlimited freedom of testation and may stipulate in his will whatever he wishes. As a result, the contents of wills may vary greatly.

The main provisions in wills are those which dispose of the property of the testator to a person or persons. Subsidiary provisions regulate the distribution of the estate by appointing executors to liquidate and to distribute the property in the estate, and where necessary by appointing administrators to manage the property, and guardians or tutors to minors and their property.

In the simplest possible form of will, the testator simply bequeaths all property to a named person. On the death of the testator, that person, if alive when the testator dies, becomes the heir, and has a vested claim to the ownership of all the testator's property, subject to payment of the debts. In this case, there is no difficulty as to the identity of the beneficiary, or the identity of the property disposed of, or the nature of the interest granted in such property.

Wills, however, are not always so simply worded; they may, and usually do, contain provisions of a more complex nature. There may, for example, be more than one beneficiary. Instead of being named, beneficiaries may be identified by some description, such as "my children" or "my surviving children." Instead being described as an aggregate ("my estate"), particular items of property may be specified, such as a farm or a motor car. Finally, the interest disposed of in the property may be

- less than ownership, such as a usufruct;
- a resolutive ownership, such as a fiduciary interest; or
- a suspensive or contingent interest, such as a fideicommissary interest.

The effect of these testamentary devices is that the same thing may be given to more than one person, either concurrently or alternatively or successively. In order to appreciate the effect of these "comprehensive and elastic provisions of our law," it is necessary to know the difference between inheritance and legacy, between ownership and usufruct, and between vested, future and conditional interests.

=== Inheritance and legacy ===
There is a particularly important distinction to be made between legacies and inheritances. This distinction plays an important role in the final distribution of an estate. The estate of a deceased person is distributed by the executor by first paying the debts, then handing over the legacies and prelegacies, and finally giving the balance to the heir or heirs.

A legacy is a disposition in a will, to a person termed the "legatee," of things which are described either specifically or generally. A specific legacy is one of

- a specified thing, such as a farm, a motor car or a particular debt owed to the testator; or
- a specified collection of things, such as a library or a flock of sheep.

A general legacy is a disposition of a class of things described as a rule by number or quantity, such as a thousand sheep, or R1,000. It would seem to follow that a legacy of all the money to the credit of the testator in a particular bank is a specific legacy.

When a legacy fails because the legatee does not want to or cannot inherit his benefit (for example, he repudiated the legacy or he dies before the testator), there are three possibilities:

- a substitute may be provided for in the will or ex lege;
- accrual may take place; or
- the bequest may fall into the residue of the estate and will be inherited by the residuary heirs.

Should a legacy fail, and the testator has not appointed a substitute, or accrual is not possible, the legacy will form part of the residue of the estate, or will form part of the intestate estate to be inherited by the intestate beneficiaries.

A prelegacy is a legacy which is left to an heir in priority to the other heirs, and in addition to any other share of the inheritance which the heir may be entitled to receive.

An inheritance is a disposition in a will, to a person termed the heir, of the residue of the estate, after the debts, legacies and prelegacies have been satisfied. It follows that the heir is in effect a residuary legatee. There may be more than one heir, in which case the shares left to them may be specified to be equal or unequal.

The institution of an heir or heirs is not today essential for the validity of a will. If the will, however, appoints only legatees, and if there is a balance left over after the debts and legacies have been paid or satisfied, there is an intestacy as to such balance. It follows that a person can die partly testate and partly intestate, although there is a presumption in favour of testacy.

An heir may be appointed as from a certain date or event, or until a certain date or event.

The chief difference between the laws relating to inheritance and to legacy arises from the fact that,

- in the case of a legacy, specified or particular property is left; whereas,
- in the case of an inheritance, the property is not specified, but consists of such property as happens to belong to the testator, or a fractional portion of such property.

It follows that, if the testator bequeaths specified property which does not in fact belong solely to him, problems arise which are not met with in inheritance.

=== Prior and legal rights ===
The Roman-Dutch notions of legitimate portion and lex hac edictali in testamentary succession were abolished at the turn of the 20th century under the influence of English law. Similarly, South Africa did not adopt the family provision and dependants’ relief of English law under the Inheritance (Provision for Family and Dependents) Act 1975.

=== Vested, conditional and future interests ===
An interest or benefit under a will may, on the death of the testator, either vest in the beneficiary immediately, or be contingent upon the fulfilment of some condition. If vested, it may be enjoyable presently, or in the future only.

=== Vested interests ===
A vested interest refers to an inheritance right which has become unconditionally fixed and established in the beneficiary, with the result that it forms an asset in the beneficiary's estate; it may be disposed of by him inter vivos or mortis causa; and it is normally transmissible to the beneficiary's heirs on his death (unless the right is purely personal to the beneficiary, such as a usufruct).

The terms dies cedit and dies venit are very important when dealing with vesting of rights.

- The phrase used to indicate that a right has vested is dies cedit, which indicates that the day or time has come when the right is due or owing.
- Another phrase, dies venit, denotes that the time for enjoyment of the thing has arrived; that is to say, that the possession and use of the thing may be claimed.

If the right has vested, but its enjoyment is postponed to the future, there is dies cedit but not dies venit. The time for enjoyment can, of course, arrive only after or simultaneously with vesting. When it does arrive, there is both dies cedit and dies venit. If there has been no vesting it follows that dies nec cedit nec venit.

=== Conditional interests ===
The question of whether, on the death of the testator, an interest under a will is conditional or vested, or vested but not immediately enjoyable, depends entirely on the intention of the testator. This intention is gathered from the language of the will. A testator may postpone dies cedit or dies venit, or both, by means of conditions or time clauses (terms), and may make a specific benefit dependent on a condition, or may link it to a term or period of time.

Suppose that the testator leaves an interest subject to a condition. A condition is a provision that, on the occurrence or non-occurrence of some uncertain future event, a right shall either be conferred or be discharged. There must be uncertainty as to the event, either because it may never happen, or because, although it must happen, it may not happen before some other specified event, such as the death of a particular person, takes place. For example, the testator may leave a sum of money to Helen "if she attains the age of 21," or "if Helen becomes Mayor of Cape Town."

The most common form of condition found in wills is "if A survives B" (B being some specified or determinable person). The effect of an interest being left conditionally is that it vests, dies cedit, only when the condition has been fulfilled. Prior to the fulfilment of the condition, there has been no dies cedit (or dies venit), and the beneficiary acquires merely a contingent right to the benefit. Suppose, then, that the testator leaves "R1,000 to my son if and when he attains the age of 21." Upon the death of the testator, and if the son is alive but under twenty-one, he acquires no vested interest. Consequently, if he dies before reaching that age, nothing is transmissible to his heirs. If, however, he attains the age of 21 dies cedit, and the legacy thereupon vests in him. The same principles are applicable where an interest is left "to Armand and upon his death after the testator to Lara." Lara acquires a vested interest only if she survives both the testator and Armand.

The conditions mentioned above are suspensive. A resolutive condition also may be attached to an interest: for example, where a usufruct is left to a widow "provided our children continue to reside with her." In such a case, the usufruct vests in the widow on the testator's death, but not absolutely for her lifetime; on the fulfilment of the resolutive condition, a divesting takes place.

There is a distinction, then, between suspensive and resolutive conditions, with regard to their influence on dies cedit and dies venit. There is also a distinction between suspensive and resolutive time clauses with regard to their influence on dies cedit and dies venit.

- Suspensive conditions: The right does not vest in the beneficiary until the condition is fulfilled. For example, X bequeaths his farm to Y on condition that Y obtains an LLB degree. If Y does not get an LLB degree, he will never obtain a right to the farm.
- Resolutive conditions: The bequest terminates on the fulfilment of the condition. For example, A bequeaths his farm to B. If B remarries, the farm will devolve on C. Thus B has a vested right to the farm until fulfilment of the condition.

==== Future interests ====
The nature of an interest which is vested but not enjoyable, as opposed to one which is both vested and enjoyable, is well illustrated by the case of a legacy by the testator of "a sum of money to my daughter, payable on her attaining the age of 25 years." In such a case, the legacy is generally not conditional upon the daughter's attaining the age of 25, but the enjoyment of it merely is postponed. It follows that, on the death of the testator if the daughter is alive, dies cedit occurs, and the legacy vests in her, but dies venit only occurs when she reaches the age of twenty-five. If the daughter dies before reaching twenty-five, her right to the legacy passes to her heirs.

An example of a similar disposition is where the testator leaves "my estate to my children, the division not to take place until the death of their mother." No condition is imposed as to the children acquiring their shares, but their enjoyment merely is postponed. The death of the mother is an event which is certain to occur. It fixes the time for the division and enjoyment by the children of their shares. Upon the death of the testator, dies cedit as far as the interests of the children are concerned, but dies venit only when the death of the mother occurs. If one of the children dies before the mother, his share vests in such child's own estate.

A similar disposition is the following one in a mutual will: "The estate is bequeathed to our children, but the survivor of us is to have the possession, the children to have no right to their portions until the death of the survivor."

==== Valid and invalid conditions ====
Under the common law, it is common to say that, if anyone attacks the validity of a will, he will lose all bequests in terms of the will. Thus conditions excluding the jurisdiction of the court were considered valid. The case of Barclays Bank v Anderson changed this.

Conditions which are impossible to carry out are invalid.

Conditions regarding the insolvency of the beneficiary are valid. It is common to provide that, if the beneficiary becomes insolvent, the bequest lapses; accordingly, the bequest will not form part of the insolvent estate.

=== Nudum praeceptum ===
If a testator places a prohibition on a bequest but fails to say what should happen with the bequest if the prohibition is contravened, it is said that the prohibition is nude (nudum praeceptum). In other words, the prohibition is of no effect, and the beneficiary will receive the bequest free from any prohibitions.

=== Estate massing ===
Estate massing takes place when two or more testators combine or mass the whole or parts of their estates into one consolidated unit and then dispose of it in terms of their mutual will:

In the case of common law estate massing, a real right is transferred to the survivor. In the case of statutory estate massing, a limited right is transferred to the survivor.

Since estate massing places a burden on the survivor, the doctrine of election comes into play. The survivor has to adiate or repudiate the massing before there can be any legal consequences.

=== Customary law ===
The same principles are applicable to testators living under a system of customary law.

=== Testamentary devices ===
We have dealt thus far with the differences between conditional, vested and future interests, since these distinctions must be known before we can appreciate the effect of the various types of dispositions in wills which dispose of interests of a more complicated nature than a simple and unconditional institution of heirs or of legatees.

A testator frequently does not dispose of the full ownership of his assets to any one or more persons, particularly in the case of landed property; he grants interests in the property less than full ownership, such as

- usufruct;
- successive interests, known as fideicommissary substitutions; or
- interests in the alternative, known as direct substitutions.

These various interests will be treated first; thereafter combinations of the various interests.

==== Usufruct ====
A usufruct, which is often confused with the fideicommissum, essentially forms part of the law of property, although it is often used in wills. A testator bequeaths the property rights to the naked owner (nudus dominus or remainderman), but the right to use, enjoy and take the fruits of the property to the usufructuary. In other words, instead of leaving the full ownership of the estate, or of a specified thing, to one person, the testator may leave the ownership to one person, subject to a usufruct in favour of another person. For example, the testator leaves "my farm to A subject to a life usufruct in favour of B". On the testator's death, both of these interests vest, the usufruct in B, and the naked ownership (nudum dominium) in A.

There are consequently two concurrent vested interests belonging to different persons in the same thing, the one enjoyable presently and the other in the future only. B's interest, the right to use the farm and to take its fruits, endures until B's death, whereupon it is extinguished; consequently B's heirs or successors acquire no rights in the farm. On B's death, A (if alive) becomes absolute owner of the farm. If A dies before B, that fact makes no difference to B's rights, for B's usufruct continues until his own death. A's ownership, subject to B's usufruct, passes to A's heirs or successors, who are bound by the usufruct until B dies.

==== Substitution ====
The testator may substitute one beneficiary for another, giving an interest to Arthur which in certain circumstances is to go to Boucher instead. There are two kinds of substitutions:

- direct (or vulgar) substitution – an interest is conferred in the alternative upon one of two persons; and
- fideicommissary substitution – an interest is conferred successively on two persons, one receiving it after the other.

Substitution, in other words, occurs when a testator appoints a beneficiary (the institute) to inherit a benefit, but at the same time nominates another beneficiary (the substitute) to take the institute's place upon the occurrence of an event, usually the institute's death.

===== Direct substitution =====
Direct substitution is created by the testator or by operation of law (ex lege) in terms of section 2C of the Wills Act, 1953. In the case of direct substitution, an interest in property is gifted to an institute (as an heir or legatee), subject to the condition that, if for some reason or other the interest does not vest in him, it is to go to the substitute. Usually, the specified reason is the institute predeceasing the testator. Other reasons might be the institute's repudiation of his interest or his being unable or unfit to succeed to said interest.

Suppose, for example, that the testator leaves "my farm to Tim, but if Tim has predeceased me, it is to go to Cameron". On the testator's death, if Tim is alive, the farm vests absolutely in Tim, and Cameron's interest is entirely extinguished. If, on the other hand, Tim dies before the testator, Tim's interest is extinguished. Consequently, Tim's heirs or successors acquire no rights; if, in that case, Cameron is still alive when the testator dies, the farm vests absolutely in Cameron. The interest passes to one or other of the beneficiaries mentioned, not to both of them; it is, as noted above, a case of transfer in the alternative.

A direct substitution will not be implied unless it is clear, as a matter of 'necessary implication', that the testator so intended in respect of an event actually contemplated by the testator. But a form of implied direct substitution has been created by statute: Whenever a testator's predeceased descendant would have taken any benefit under the testator's will, had he survived the testator, the descendants of that descendant are entitled to take that benefit per stirpes, unless the will's terms indicate a contrary intention.

===== Fideicommissary substitution =====
A substitution is fideicommissary when an interest is gifted to an institute (as an heir or legatee), subject to the passing of the interest to the substitute on the fulfilment of a condition. The testator in this case is termed the fideicommittens; the institute, a "fiduciary"; the substitute, the "fideicommissary"; and the whole disposition, a fideicommissum. A fideicommissum may be defined, then, as the grant of an interest in property to a fiduciary, subject to the interest's passing to fideicommissary on the happening of a condition.

A fideicommissum simplex is constituted where the testator leaves "my farm (or estate) to Stuart, and on Stuart’s death, after me, it is to go to Luke". The legal effect of this disposition is that, on the testator's death, if Stuart is then alive, the ownership of the farm vests in Stuart, subject to Luke's interest, which is as follows: Luke acquires no vested interest in the farm, only a contingent right, for Luke's interest vests only if and when the condition is fulfilled—in this case, if Luke is alive when Stuart dies, in which event the fideicommissum terminates and the absolute ownership vests in Luke.

If Luke dies before Stuart, the condition of the fideicommissum fails, Luke's rights are extinguished, and there is nothing to transmit to Luke's estate or successors (unless there is a clear indication in the will to the contrary). Stuart's fiduciary interest ripens into full ownership (dominium).

If Stuart dies before the testator, then, under Roman-Dutch law, the fideicommissum failed, and Luke obtained no rights whatsoever on the death of the testator. This rule, however, has been abrogated, with the result that now, on the testator's death, Luke (assuming that he is alive) acquires full ownership, for he succeeds directly to the testator, the fiduciary interest having fallen away.

It will be seen that a fideicommissum confers successive interests in the same property on two persons. The first interest vests (as a rule) on the death of the testator; the second (being conditional) vests only if and when the condition is fulfilled.

Fideicommissary substitution can be created expressly or tacitly. A fideicommissum can be implied by a si sine liberis decesserit (meaning "if you die without children") clause or by a prohibition against alienation in the will.

The nature of a fideicommissum is burdensome, since it limits the fiduciary's ownership. It is not favoured in South African common law. A presumption against fideicommissa exists, but only where there is doubt as to whether a testator intended direct or fideicommissary substitution.

==== Difference between usufruct and fideicommissum ====
These two interests are similar in some respects, but they differ in others. They are very much alike, in that both a usufructuary and a fiduciary have the use and enjoyment of the property for their lifetime; they differ in that, whereas a usufructuary can never automatically acquire any greater right in the property, a fiduciary's right may in his lifetime ripen into absolute ownership (if, for example, the fideicommissary dies before him).

The rights of the remainderman, either the naked owner or the fideicommissary respectively, naturally differ very considerably. In the case of a usufruct, the owner of the property has a vested right, although the owner's enjoyment is postponed, whereas the right of a fideicommissary is not vested, but rather contingent upon fulfilment of the fideicommissary condition.

It is frequently difficult to ascertain from a will which of these interests a testator intended to grant. The law reports contain numerous instances of the courts' being requested to interpret wills where one party contends that the interest is usufructuary and the other claims that it is fiduciary. The actual decisions in these cases depend on whether the testator intended to grant the remainderman, the person who is to have the later enjoyment of the property, a vested or a conditional right.

In addition to the ordinary form of fideicommissum described above, two peculiar forms are recognized by the law, a fideicommissum residui and a fideicommissum purum.

==== Fideicommissum residui ====
The fideicommissum residui is a form of fideicommissum which constitutes an exception to the general rule that the fiduciary may not alienate the fideicommissary property. It is a fideicommissum of the residue of the property left at the death of the fiduciary. Property is bequeathed to a fiduciary on condition that, on his death, whatever is left of the property is to go to another person.

The legal effect of such a disposition is that, by virtue of a rule of the Roman law, still in force in South Africa, the fiduciary is prima facie entitled in his lifetime to alienate or dispose of three-quarters of the property, but not more. Consequently, the fiduciary is only bound to transmit one-fourth of the property to the fideicommissary. If, however, the fiduciary gives security for restitution of one-quarter of the estate, the fiduciary may alienate the whole of the estate.

The fiduciary may not dispose of any of the property either by gift mortis causa or by will. It follows that the fideicommissary may claim all of the property originally granted to the fiduciary that remains in the estate of the fiduciary upon the latter's death, even if it is more than a quarter of the original property. It would seem that, if the property remaining over has actually increased in amount or value, the fideicommissary may claim all of it on the principle that the person who bears the loss is entitled to the profits.

==== Fideicommissum purum ====
This was the original form of fideicommissum in Roman law, introduced to evade the technicalities and restrictions of the ordinary law of inheritance and legacy. It was a bequest to an heir or legatee (the fiduciary) with an instruction to hand over the bequest to a third party (the fideicommissary) who was otherwise disqualified from taking.

The interests of both the fiduciary and the fideicommissary vested immediately on the death of the testator, and were therefore simultaneous and coextensive rather than successive. The interest of the fiduciary was not a beneficial one; it was purely transitory, as the fiduciary was under an immediate and continuous duty to hand the bequest to the fideicommissary.

Later, other forms of unconditional fideicommissa came to be recognised, such as the fideicommissum in diem and the fideicommissum sub modo. With the gradual assimilation of the rules relating to fideicommissa and legacies, the fideicommissum purum lost its original purpose. Its application in Roman-Dutch law was apparently extremely rare.

In Estate Kemp v McDonald's Trustee, however, Innes CJ used the concept of fideicommissum purum in an attempt to explain the juristic nature of a testamentary trust in South African law. Although criticised, this decision was subsequently followed in numerous cases. The term fideicommissum purum was used to denote generally an unconditional fideicommissum: one without any condition suspending the vesting of the interest of the fideicommissary.

In Braun v Blann & Botha NNO, however, the Appellate Division ruled that "it is both historically and jurisprudentially wrong to identify the trust with the fideicommissum and to equate a trustee to a fiduciary". Nevertheless, it remains open to the testator to create an unconditional fideicommissum, such as one sub certo die: for example, a bequest to A for ten years, and thereafter to B.

==== Trust ====
A trust may be created by will or by an act inter vivos. A testamentary trust is constituted when a testator bequeaths property to one person, called a "trustee" or an "administrator", with an instruction to administer it for the benefit of another person or other persons appointed by the will, or for an impersonal object or purpose (the so-called charitable trust).

The essential feature of a trust is the separation of the ownership or control of property from the beneficial enjoyment thereof. The trustee acquires no beneficial interest in the property, acting merely as a conduit pipe in carrying out the dispositions in favour of the beneficiary. The interest of the beneficiary in the property may vest immediately on the testator's death or at some later date, depending on the testator's intention as expressed in his will. Statutory provision has been made for the protection of trust property which is settled upon a person either inter vivos or by will, to be administered by him for the benefit of other persons.

=== Bequests subject to a modus ===
A clause or provision in a will which imposes on a beneficiary the duty of employing the proceeds of a bequest for certain specified purposes is termed a modus. The addition of a modus to a bequest does not make it conditional. Consequently, the legacy vests in the legatee on the testator's death; no fideicommissum is created in favour of the persons intended to be benefited.

The modus has to be distinguished from a condition. The modus can manifest itself in different forms:

- in the interest of the beneficiary himself;
- in the interest of a specific person; or
- in the interest of an impersonal purpose.

=== Interpretation of some common dispositions in wills ===
Frequently the language used in a will is not sufficiently clear and unambiguous for the executor to determine what interests in property are disposed of, or who the beneficiaries are. In such a case, it is necessary for the court to interpret the will. As stated before, the cardinal principle in construing a will is to ascertain from a consideration of it in its entirety the intention of the testator. In order to ascertain this intention, where the will is ambiguous, recourse is had to certain presumptions and canons of construction which have long been accepted in the interpretation of wills. Illustrations are given below of some of the more common and important dispositions, in connection with fideicommissa, which have been the subject of interpretation by the courts.

==== Presumption against fideicommissa ====
The court, in interpreting wills, leans in favour of an absolute ownership of property having been bequeathed rather than, as occurs in the case of a fideicommissum, a burdened ownership.

For instance, whenever a will mentions two persons as beneficiaries of the same property and there is a reasonable doubt whether the testator intended

- that both of them were to have interests, the institute to have the property for life and the substitute to succeed the institute on his death (in other words, a fideicommissum); or
- that one or other of them alone should have an interest, the substitute being substituted for the institute only if the institute does not in fact succeed (in other words, a direct substitution),

there is a presumption that the disposition is not a fideicommissum, but that it is a direct substitution.

For example, suppose that the testator leaves "my farm to my son A and on A’s death to my son B." It is not clear from these words whether the testator intended that both A, and B after A, should have an interest in the farm, or whether only one of them should acquire the farm. Since there is reasonable doubt as to the intention of the testator, the court will interpret the will as conferring an absolute ownership in the farm upon one of the sons only, thereby effecting a direct substitution. This the court does by assuming that the reference in the will to A's death meant not A's death at any time, but only if it occurred before the death of the testator. It follows that the will is construed as if it were worded "I leave my farm to my son A, and if A dies before me it is to go to my son B."

This presumption arises only if there is a reasonable doubt as to the intention of the testator. Therefore, if it is shown that the testator contemplated the death of the institute as taking place not in the testator's lifetime, but only after the testator's death, the presumption does not arise; the disposition is held to be a fideicommissum. For example, where the testator was fifty-seven years of age and left a farm to his grandson aged six, subject to the condition that, if the grandson came to die without lawful descendants, the farm should revert to the testator's children, the court held that the intention of the testator was to create a fideicommissum.

The presumption in favour of a direct substitution does not arise if it is clear that the testator intended to grant different interests in the same property to two persons, not alternatively but either successively (as in the case of a fideicommissum) or concurrently (as in the case where the ownership is left to one person subject to a usufruct in favour of another); in other words, there is no presumption that the interest of the institute is an ownership subject to a direct substitution, nor is there a presumption that his interest is usufructuary and not fiduciary.

==== Si sine liberis decesserit clause ====
One of the most common conditions inserted in wills regarding property passing from one person to another is "if the former dies without leaving children," si sine liberis decesserit. For example, the testator leaves "my property to A, and if A dies without children, to B." If A succeeds to the property and dies without leaving children, the condition is fulfilled and the property vests in B; but, if A dies, leaving children, the condition is not fulfilled. The property does not go to B; instead it goes to A's children, provided they are descendants of the testator and there are no contrary indications in the will, for in these circumstances a tacit fideicommissum in favour of the children is implied by law.

The same result is obtained where the si sine liberis condition is not express but implied. If the fiduciary is a descendant of the testator, and the fideicommissary is not, then in the absence of a contrary indication in the will the further condition "if the fiduciary die without children" is implied before the fideicommissary interest can vest. Such a condition is implied in the case of fideicommissary substitution only and not in that of direct substitution.

=== Implied fideicommissa ===
In spite of the fact that there is a presumption against fideicommissa, nevertheless a fideicommissum is implied by law in favour of particular persons in the case of certain dispositions. The chief instances are those where an express fideicommissum is made conditional on a si sine liberis decesserit clause, and where there is a prohibition against alienation out of a family.

==== Fideicommissum subject to a si sine liberis condition ====
As we have just seen, where a testator leaves property to a fiduciary (A) subject to the condition (express or implied) that, if A should come to die without issue (si sine liberis decesserit), the property is to pass over to another person (B, the fideicommissary), the law implies a tacit fideicommissum in favour of A's issue, the liberi, provided that

- the liberi are descendants of the testator; and
- there are not sufficient indications in the will of a contrary intention on the part of the testator.

It follows that, if these conditions are met, and if A dies leaving children or remoter descendants, they will inherit the property in preference to B.

==== Prohibitions against alienation ====
If property is left to an heir on the condition that the heir shall not alienate it, but no provision is made for the property passing to any other heir in case of a breach of the condition, or if no heir is specified or indicated in whose favour the prohibition is imposed, the prohibition is of no force or effect and is said to be nude (nudum praeceptum), for there is no fideicommissary.

If, however, there is a provision that, on a breach of the condition, the property is to go to a certain heir, there is clearly a fideicommissum in favour of the mentioned heir, as where the testator leaves "my farm to A, subject to the condition that he shall not alienate it, and if he does the farm shall go to B." Similarly, if a prohibition against alienation is made in favour of a class of persons, a fideicommissum is implied in favour of such class. For example, where the testator leaves "my farm to my daughter A, provided that she shall not alienate the farm out of the family," a fideicommissum is created in favour of the testator's descendants. The class to be favoured must be clearly specified; otherwise no fideicommissum is constituted.

The question of whether one or more persons or generations are bound as fiduciaries by a prohibition against alienation depends on whether the prohibition is unicum (personal) or duplex (real).

If the prohibition is personal, it applies only to the persons prohibited and is confined to them. They may not alienate the property, but the fideicommissaries, once they have succeeded to the property, may do so. A prohibition is personal when it is imposed upon a certain person or persons by name or as a class, such as "children" (but not "descendants"), as, for example, where the testator leaves his farm to "my sons A and B," or "to my sons," or "to my children," and prohibits them from alienating it out of the family. The restraint is personal to the children only or to the sons only, as the case may be. On their deaths, when the farm has descended to their heirs, the restraint is removed and the fideicommissum extinguished.

If, on the other hand, a prohibition is real, it binds all the persons to whom the property may descend. Not only is the first beneficiary or beneficiaries prohibited from alienating the property, but also any subsequent beneficiary to whom it may descend as a result of the fideicommissum. A prohibition is real when it is clearly the testator's intention to make it binding on successive or recurring generations, as when the testator prohibits his "descendants" from alienating the farm out of the family.

It is, however, enacted by the Immovable Property (Removal or Modification of Restrictions) Act, 1965 that, after the commencement of the Act (1 October 1965), any fideicommissum created in favour of more than two successive fideicommissaries shall be limited to two, whatever the wording of the will. Where the fideicommissum was created before the commencement of the Act, only two successive fideicomrnissaries are permitted from the date of the will. If, at the date of commencement, two or more fideicommissary substitutions have already taken place, the fideicommissum shall be terminated at the date of commencement.

=== Statutory aids to interpretation ===
The Wills Act, 1953 contains several provisions that serve as interpretative aids when construing wills. Unless the context of a will indicates otherwise, when interpreting a will,

- an adopted child must be regarded as being born of its adoptive parents, not of its natural parents;
- the fact that a person was born out of wedlock is not taken into account when determining their relationship with the testator or another person;
- if a benefit is left to the children of a person or to members of a class of persons mentioned in a will, it is presumed that the benefit was intended to vest in the children of the person or in members of the class of persons who are alive at the time of the devolution of the benefit or who have already been conceived at that time and who are later born alive.

=== Combinations of various interests ===
Various interests (usufructuary, fiduciary, or fideicommissary) relating to the same property may be combined. Each of these interests may be made subject to direct substitutions. The following are examples of the less complex of these combinations.

==== Fideicommissum upon fideicommissum ====
A fideicommissum may be imposed upon a fideicommissum, as where the testator leaves "my farm to A; on A's death after me it is to go to B; on B's death after A it is to go to C". In this case, B's interest is fideicommissary in respect of A's interest, and fiduciary in respect of C's interest. A familiar instance of such a disposition occurs in the case of a prohibition against the alienation of property out of a family, for there a fideicommissum is imposed on each successive generation; subject now, of course, to the statutory limit on the duration of fideicommissa.

==== Compendiosa substitutio ====
This is both a fideicommissary and a direct substitution in respect of the same persons. For example, the testator leaves ‘my farm to A, and on his death it is to go to B; if A dies before me it is to go to B’. The object of this double substitution which was in use in former times was to ensure that B would succeed if the fideicommissum collapsed owing to the fiduciary predeceasing the testator. Today the double substitution is superfluous.

==== Ownership subject to a usufruct with a direct substitution as to the usufruct at the testator’s death ====
For example, the testator leaves "my farm to my son A, subject to a life usufruct to my sister B, or if B has predeceased me, to my sister C." The legal effect of this disposition is that, on the testator's death, the ownership of the farm vests in A, if he is then alive—subject to a life usufruct in favour of B, for whom C may be directly substituted. In other words, if B is then alive, she acquires the usufruct of the farm, and C acquires no rights. If B dies before the testator, but C is alive upon his death, C acquires the life usufruct.

==== Ownership subject to a usufruct as to which there is a fideicommissary substitution ====
For example, the testator leaves "my farm to my son, subject to a life usufruct to my mother, and on her death a life usufruct to my wife." On the testator's death, the ownership of the farm vests in the son, if he is then alive, and the usufruct vests in the mother, if she is then alive. The wife, however, acquires no vested interest, for her right is conditional on her surviving the mother. The wife's usufruct vests only if and when she is alive at the time of the mother's death. If the mother predeceases the testator, but the wife is alive at his death, then of course the usufruct vests in the latter.

==== Ownership subject to a usufruct with a direct substitution as to the ownership at the testator’s death ====
For example, the testator leaves "my farm to my wife for her life, the farm to go on my death to my son A, or if A has predeceased me, to my son B." On the testator's death the usufruct of the farm vests in his wife if she survives him, and the ownership of the farm subject to the usufruct vests in A, or, if A has predeceased the testator, in B.

==== Ownership subject to a usufruct with a direct substitution as to the ownership at the death of the usufructuary ====
For example, the testator leaves "my estate to my wife for her life, and on her death it is to be divided equally among our children or such of them as may then be alive." On the testator's death, the usufruct of the estate vests in the widow, and on her death the ownership of the estate vests in the surviving children, these being directly substituted for the original group which consisted of the surviving children and those who predeceased their mother.

==== Fideicommissum in which one fideicommissary is directly substituted for another ====
For example, the testator leaves "my farm to X and if X dies after me without children, it shall go to Y, but if X dies leaving children it shall go to X’s children." A fideicommissum of the farm is constituted, X being the fiduciary and the fideicommissary either X's children or Y, the latter being directly substituted for the children in the event of X dying without leaving children. A similar disposition is effected where the testator leaves his farm "to my son A and on A’s death after me to A’s eldest son; if A has no son then alive, to A’s eldest daughter." A simple form of disposition, with the same effect, is where the testator institutes "my wife sole heir and after her decease our children, and in case of the predecease of any child his lawful descendants."

== Effect of wills ==
The chief effect of a will is to confer rights on the beneficiaries. A beneficiary, however, whether heir or legatee, acquires no right in the property of the testator unless he accepts the benefit.

=== Rights of heirs ===
On acceptance or adiation of the inheritance, the heir obtains a vested right to claim from the executor payment or delivery of all the property in the estate after satisfaction of the debts and legacies. But the heir's claim is enforceable only when the liquidation and distribution account has been confirmed. Where there is more than one heir, each has this right in respect of his proportionate share.

=== Rights of legatees ===
On the acceptance of a legacy, a legatee obtains a vested right to claim from the executor delivery of the specific asset bequeathed to him, or registration in the case of immovable property; this claim is enforceable only when the liquidation and distribution account has been confirmed.

Where the assets in the estate are sufficient to satisfy all the legacies, pecuniary and corporeal, in full, there is no difficulty as to each legatee obtaining delivery of the bequest; but problems arise where the property specified as being bequeathed did not in fact belong to the testator at all, or only belonged to the testator jointly with other persons.

Where the testator leaves as a legacy specified property which belongs in fact to a third person, but which the testator in error thought they owned, the legacy is void; if, however, the testator knew that the property belonged to a third person it is the duty of the executor to buy the property from the owner at a reasonable price and to hand it over to the legatee, and if unable to do so to pay the legatee its value. If the property had been mortgaged or pledged, and the testator was aware of that fact, then unless a contrary intention appears from the will it is the duty of the executor to discharge the debt and to hand over the property free to the legatee.

If the property specified belongs to the residuary heir then, whether the testator knew or did not know that fact, the legacy is valid. The heir, however, has an election to accept or to refuse the terms. If the heir accepts the inheritance, the heir must allow his own property to go to the legatee; if the heir refuses to adiate and retains his own property, the heir cannot accept any benefit under the will.

Where the property specified belongs jointly to the testator and to a third person it is clear that the testator cannot override the rights of the co-owner; the testator's will cannot do more than he personally could do and the legacy is not binding on the co-owner. There is a presumption in such a case that only the testator's share is bequeathed if it is doubtful from the will whether the testator intended to burden his estate with the duty of buying out the co-owner's share. This presumption may, however, be rebutted and more easily so where the testator bequeaths property belonging jointly to the testator and their spouse. If the property bequeathed belongs jointly to the testator and to the residuary heir, the whole of the property is deemed to be bequeathed; but the heir has an election whether to accept the terms of the will or to keep his share of the property.

If the property belongs to the legatee himself the legacy is void, unless the testator had some real right, such as a mortgage, in the property; in that case the testator is deemed to remit such right and to leave the property unburdened to the legatee.

==== Abatement of legacies ====
If, after the debts of the testator have been paid, the estate is insufficient to satisfy all the legacies in full, they are reduced proportionately or "abated". There is a presumption that abatement applies to all the legacies unless the will shows a clear intention to the contrary. A will may, of course, make express provision for abatement, for example the abatement of annuities in the event of a shortfall of income. It would appear that South Africa law draws no distinction between specific and general legacies for the purposes of abatement.

The order of distribution among the beneficiaries in an estate which is unable fully to discharge all the legacies is analogous if not identical with the order of distribution in insolvency. The beneficiaries have personal claims against the estate and they are in the position of creditors who cannot all be paid in full. The preferred legatees correspond to the secured creditors, and the other legatees to the concurrent creditors. The preferred legatees have preference and are satisfied in full and the balance is divided proportionately among the remaining legatees. The heirs in such a case get nothing at all.

=== Rights of fiduciaries and fideicommissaries ===
Under a simple form of fideicommissum the right of the fiduciary (as stated earlier) vests on the death of the testator; the right of the fideicommissary vests only upon the fulfilment of the attached condition, which is almost invariably that the fideicommissary be alive at the death of the fiduciary, whereupon the fideicommissary becomes the unconditional owner of the property. Likewise, if the fiduciary for any reason fails to take or renounces his rights, the inheritance passes to the surviving fideicommissaries, provided that the latter class is then ascertainable and that there is no other provision in the will postponing vesting or enjoyment of the interest. Pending the vesting in the fideicommissary, the right and duties of the parties are as follows:

The fiduciary acquires a resolutive ownership; he has the right to possess the property, to use it and take the fruits, but not to depreciate it. The fiduciary may not alienate or mortgage the property except in the following cases:

- Where the will confers the right of alienation on the fiduciary either expressly or impliedly, as in the case of a fideicommissum residui, when the fiduciary may alienate three-quarters of the property.
- Where all the persons, being majors, who are interested in the fideicommissum agree to the alienation, provided that the fideicommissum was imposed for their benefit and for no other reason. It follows that the fideicommissum may generally be extinguished by the joint act of the fiduciary and the fideicommissary. It must be noted that what is termed a "family arrangement" between the beneficiaries which purports to effect substantial deviations from the provisions of a will are as a rule not lawful; but special considerations arise in connection with fideicommissa permitting such departures.
- With the authority of the court on the grounds of necessity (ob causam necessarium),
  - to pay the debts of the testator and to make provision for the legacies bequeathed by they when there is no other property available for the purpose;
  - to pay taxes imposed on the property;
  - to pay expenses which are necessary for the preservation or protection of the property; or
  - to provide necessary maintenance for the children of the fiduciary where the latter is indigent.
- The court has power, by virtue of statute, to remove or modify testamentary restrictions on immovable property in certain circumstances, inter alia, where it will be to the advantage of the persons, born or unborn, certain or uncertain, who are beneficiaries under a will.

The fiduciary's rights are subject to the rights of creditors. Hence execution may be levied against the fiduciary's rights in pursuance of a judgment obtained against him. On the insolvency, the fiduciary's rights vest in his trustee (unless the will provides otherwise) and they may be sold subject, of course, to the rights of the fideicommissary. A fiduciary, again, may let the property for the period of their right, but not beyond the same. Consequently, the fiduciary may not grant a lease which is entitled to registration, such as a lease in longum tempus, with the exception of a lease for his own life.

The fiduciary, if called upon, must give security for delivery of the property to the fideicommissary when the condition is fulfilled unless:

- under the will the fiduciary is entitled to alienate the fideicommissary estate;
- the testator has dispensed with the requirement of security; and
- the fideicommissary is the child, brother, or sister of the fiduciary.

In the case of a fideicommissum residui, security for a quarter only of the property need be given. In the case of immovable property, it is the duty of the executor to have the terms of the fideicommissary disposition registered or endorsed against the title deeds of the property, and consequently there is probably no necessity for security to be given.

If the estate of the fideicommissary heir or legatee is sequestrated, his contingent interest does not vest in the trustee; but if the interest becomes vested while the estate is under sequestration, it ipso facto passes to the trustee.

A fideicommissary has prior to the vesting of his interest only a contingent right to the property (sometimes referred to as a mere spes or expectation of benefit). If, however, any attempt is made by the fiduciary or by any third persons to infringe the rights of the fideicommissary the court will give the latter ample and effective protection. Thus the court will interdict a threatened alienation of the fideicommissary property, and it will refuse to grant execution against the property in respect of a judgment obtained against the fiduciary. Similarly the court will generally not allow the fiduciary to mortgage the property, for the fideicommissary is not liable for the debts of the fiduciary; but as pointed out earlier, there are circumstances in which the court may consent to the mortgage or sale of the fideicommissary property. The contingent right of the fideicommissary may be ceded and such cession need not be notarially executed.

=== Ius accrescendi ===
Ius accrescendi, or the right of accrual, is the right of beneficiaries to whom an interest in property has been left jointly to take the share of one of them who fails to take their share. Such failure may take place by the death of the beneficiary before vesting occurs; or by the beneficiary's incapacity to take their share; or by the beneficiary's refusal to adiate.

Where the ius accrescendi operates the co-beneficiaries to whom the vacant portion accrues take the same shares thereof as they do of their own portion. Where it does not operate the share vacated by a co-heir devolves upon the intestate heirs of the testator, while the share vacated by a co-legatee falls into the residue of the estate and devolves upon the heirs, testate or intestate, of the testator.

The right of accrual, then, is the right co-heirs and co-legatees have of inheriting a share which a co-heir or co-legatee cannot, or does not wish to, receive. Accrual can, however, only operate if provision is not made for substitution either by the testator himself or herself, or ex lege through the operation of section 2C of the Wills Act, 1953.

Whether or not accrual operates in certain circumstances depends on the intention of the testator as it appears from the will. The testator may make some express provision on the point. If the intention of the testator is not clear, his probable intention must be deduced from certain indications in the language of the will itself, or from the surrounding circumstances. To assist the court in ascertaining the testator's probable intention various canons of construction or conjecturae have been evolved, the most important of which concerns the method of joinder of the beneficiaries.

The mode in which beneficiaries are joined is only one of the indications, although an important one, in ascertaining the probable intention of the testator. It must be stressed, however, that these conjecturae are merely guides and not hard and fast rules of law.

==== Express provision concerning accrual ====
The testator may make express provision for a right of accruallapsing of the share of one of several beneficiaries by substituting the remainder in his place; for example, where he leaves his estate "to my children and if any of them predecease me, his share shall pass to the others," or "shall revert to the estate," or "to my children, or such of them as may be alive at my death".

On the other hand, the testator may expressly negative any accrual to the original beneficiaries where he directs that upon the lapsing of a share it shall go to some third person or persons, e.g. where he appoints "my children as my heirs and if any of them predecease me his lawful descendants shall take his share."

==== No provision concerning accrual ====
In the absence of any contrary indication in the will as to the testator's intention the ius accrescendi takes place where the beneficiaries have been appointed jointly, or re et verbis; but not where they have been appointed to separate shares, or verbis tantum. Even if the form of joinder of heirs in a will is verbis tantum, the intention of the testator may be otherwise. It is in the will that indications of the testator's opinion must be sought but it is permissible and sometimes essential to read and interpret the will in the light of the relevant circumstances existing at the time of its making.

Thus there is generally a right of accrual where the appointment is joint, e.g. "to A and B jointly," or simply "to A and B," or "to our three sons." On the other hand, there is prima facie no right of accrual where the appointment is verbis tantum, i.e. to separate shares—e.g. where the property is left "to A and B in equal shares," or where the estate "is to be divided into five portions each of which is to go to a specified person," or where "the property is to be divided among the children, share and share alike"—and clearly not where separate and distinct portions of a farm are left to various beneficiaries.

In order that the ius accrescendi should operate where the beneficiaries are appointed verbis tantum, it must appear from the will that the testator positively contemplated the lapse of a specific share, and that the testator intended that such share should in that event accrue to the other beneficiaries. It has been suggested that such an intention appears where the testator appoints two or more persons "sole and universal heirs."

The rules relating to the ius accrescendi apply not only where the interest disposed of is ownership but also where it is a fideicommissary interest, or a usufruct, or a right to income under a trust; but not where it is a fiduciary interest, and adiation has taken place, for the interest has then vested.

Once an interest has vested in the beneficiaries there can be no ius accrescendi, because if one of the beneficiaries dies his share vests in his estate. There is an obvious exception in the case of a usufruct; on the death of one of the usufructuaries, his interest accrues to the other usufructuaries.
