= Macdonald v The Master =

South African legal case

In Macdonald v The Master, an important case in the South African law of succession, the deceased had left four handwritten notes before he committed suicide. In one of the notes, there was an indication that his will was to be found on his computer at work in a particular file. The document on the computer was not signed by the deceased nor any witnesses; the Master rejected it.

The evidence before the court indicated that this computer was password-protected, and that the only recording of the password was written down, sealed, and locked away. Only the deceased would have had access to his computer at work; no one else could have typed the will and left it there. The court held that all three requirements in Ex Parte Maurice were present, as it was highly probable that the document was drafted by the deceased himself. The court declared the will valid.

== See also ==
- South African law of succession
