= Anderson v Estate Anderson =

South African legal case

In Anderson v Estate Anderson, an important case in the South African law of succession, the testator had bequeathed a farm to his four sons, subject to a fideicommissum in favour of their eldest sons to the fourth generation, and subject to the limitation that any son selling his share was bound to sell to the remaining sons or son.

The court held that, where a son is given a fiduciary interest in property under his father's will, the son's interest ceases upon his death and he cannot dispose of it by will. Furthermore, a sale of such share does not free it from the fideicommissum. A clause disqualifying any son who became insolvent from obtaining a right under the will did not operate to disqualify an insolvent who was a fideicommissary under the will but who was rehabilitated before the right of succession accrued to him. Thus a condition that the bequest will lapse if the beneficiary becomes insolvent is not contra bonos mores.
