= Spies v Smith =

South African legal case

In Spies v Smith, an important case in the South African law of succession, the testator was intellectually disabled and epileptic, and had appointed the two daughters of his step-mother as his sole heirs. When the testator's father died, he went to live with his uncle. Thereafter, the testator made a new will appointing the sons of his uncle as his heirs.

The testator's step-mother alleged that his uncle had unduly influenced him to pass this second will, but the court held that she did not discharge the requisite onus of proving such.

== See also ==
- South African law of succession
