= Ex Parte Estate Davies =

South African legal case

In Ex Parte Estate Davies, an important case in South African succession law, the testator bequeathed £2000 in his will to a person who was not named in the will itself, but on a document which was in a sealed envelope given to his attorney. This document was not signed by witnesses.

The question before the court was thus whether this was a valid disposition. The court held that the disposition was invalid, because the testator did not comply with the statutory formalities regarding witnesses and signatures, as well as the fact that the identity of the beneficiary was not disclosed in the will.

== See also ==
- South African succession law
