= Van Zyl v Esterhuyse =

In Van Zyl v Esterhuyse, an important case in the law of succession in South Africa, the applicant applied for the rectification of a joint will executed by herself and her deceased husband. The will appointed her as the sole heir subject to the conditions

- that a cash bequest of R10,000 be made to Mr and Mrs Liebenberg;
- that the rest of the estate be bequeathed to the testator's children; and
- that Mr and Mrs Liebenberg be appointed guardians of the children.

The Master was of the opinion that the applicant would only inherit if the bequest to Mr and Mrs Liebenberg and the children failed.

The applicant submitted that the will had been drawn up by a bank official, and that she and her husband had signed it hastily and without guidance.

She testified that their intention was that the survivor of them would inherit the whole estate and that their children would inherit only in the event of their dying simultaneously.

The court accordingly held that the will had to be rectified by the insertion of words which made the appointment of the children as heirs, bequest to Mr and Mrs Liebenberg and the appointment of the latter as guardians conditional upon the simultaneous death of the testators.
