= Marais v The Master =

South African legal case

In Marais v The Master, an important case in the South African law of succession, the testator, who had divorced from his wife in 1972, bequeathed his entire estate to her in 1977. Before his death, he wrote words on his copy of the will and on a letter from his attorney, attempting to revoke the will and direct that his mother was to be his sole heir. The court held that there had been a clear intention to revoke the will and to nominate his mother as sole beneficiary.

== See also ==
- South African law of succession
