= Kirsten v Bailey =

South African legal case

In Kirsten v Bailey, an important case in the South African law of succession, a testatrix made three wills. In the first and third, Bailey was nominated as the sole beneficiary of her estate; in the second will, Kirsten was nominated as the sole beneficiary. Kirsten challenged the validity of the third will.

The court held that Bailey had led the testatrix to believe that he would leave her unless she appointed him her sole heir. Thus, Kirsten had proved that the testatrix was unduly influenced, and accordingly lacked the requisite capacity. The testatrix therefore was held to have died intestate.

The effect of the ruling is that if a court declares the last in a series of wills to be invalid ab initio, the deceased is deemed to have died intestate. The court will not give effect to an earlier will, as it had already been revoked.

== See also ==
- South African law of succession
