= L Taylor v AE Pim =

South African legal case

In L. Taylor v AE Pim, an important case in the South African law of succession.

== Events ==
A widow hired a man, Pim, to assist with her business. She subsequently began dating the man; she also started developing severe alcoholism. In terms of her will, Pim was to be the sole heir of her assets.

Shortly before the deceased's death, she and Pim were on holiday together. When the deceased fell ill, Pim refused to allow the hotel in which they were staying to call a doctor for her. Finally, they insisted it was their duty to call one, who duly arrived. Due to the doctor's late arrival, however, she died.

The court held that, although Pim had not caused her death, he had allowed the testatrix to lead an immoral life, and was the one who had encouraged her alcohol abuse; therefore, he was unworthy to inherit from her estate.

== See also ==
- Law of succession in South Africa
- Law of persons in South Africa

== Sources ==
- L. Taylor v AE Pim (1903) 24 NLR 484.
