= Carelse v Estate De Vries =

South African legal case

In Carelse v Estate De Vries, an important case in South African succession law, Carelse was seduced, on the promise of marriage, by the deceased (who was already married with children). Carelse and the deceased continued their relationship, which produced seven children, before the deceased died intestate.

At that time, the Intestate Succession Act said that illegitimate children could not inherit from their deceased parents. The court held, however, that this was no longer the proper position, and awarded maintenance to the children. Although the deceased died intestate, the principle is the same for persons who die testate.

== See also ==
- South African succession law
