= Senekal v Meyer =

South African legal case

In Senekal v Meyer, an important case in South African succession law, the testator had a valid will. On it he had written the word “gekanselleer” (cancelled) on both of the pages of the copy in his possession. The Master, however, accepted the testator's attorney’s copy as the deceased's valid will and testament.

The deceased's current wife sought an order from the court declaring that the deceased had died intestate, as he had intended to revoke this earlier will. This was opposed by the deceased's first wife, who was the sole heir in terms of the will. The court held that the deceased had expressed a clear intention to revoke his will, and so the deceased was found to have died intestate.

== See also ==
- South African succession law
