= Barrow v The Master =

South African legal case

In Barrow v The Master, an important case in South African succession law, the testator had convinced his son to leave his job and take over the management and farming operations on the farm “Longridge” from him. To assist him, the testator bought another farm “Meldene” for his son (the son paid a small portion of this) to live on while managing Longridge. Because the son was finding it inconvenient and difficult to manage the farming operations on Longridge while living at Meldene the testator decided to sell 'Longridge' for a net price of £10,000 and undertook to give his son the sum of £262 which he calculated would be the amount of the selling agent's commission. The farm was sold and another smaller farm called “Patchwood” was purchased. In his will the testator had bequeathed Longridge to his two sons in equal shares. Thus when the testator died, his son claimed for his half share in the farm Patchwood. The claim to Patchwood is founded on a promise by the testator during his lifetime to donate to his son a farm to the value of at least £5,000. Alternatively, the son claimed that the bequest of a half-share of Longridge had not been adeemed. On the first argument, the court held that the testator had settled his promise by purchasing the farm Meldene for his son. Furthermore, the court held that the purchase of Patchwood was effected to replace the facilities for farming that his son would lose by the sale of Longridge, not that the farm was actually for him. On the second argument, the court rejected the contention that the testator felt obliged to sell the farm because his son was finding it difficult to manage it and it was thus not voluntary. The court held that involuntary alienations only arise out of necessity such as pressing debts. Thus the alienation was voluntary and the bequest had adeemed.

== See also ==
- South African succession law
