= Minister of Education v Syfrets Trust =

South African legal case

In Minister of Education v Syfrets Trust, an important case in the South African law of succession, the deceased was a doctor who died in 1951, and set up a charitable trust in terms of his will at the University of Cape Town. In terms of the trust, applicants who wished to utilise these funds had to be white males who were not Jewish. The court held that these requirements for eligibility discriminated on the basis of race, religion and sex, and held that the trust funds should instead be available to any applicant.

== See also ==
- South African law of succession
