= Harlow v Becker =

South African legal case

Harlow v Becker was an important case in the South African law of succession.

Harlow's mother executed a will leaving her estate to Harlow (her daughter), her grandchildren, and her great-grandchildren. Two days before Harlow's mother died, she revoked the will and bequeathed her entire estate to her doctor. Harlow alleged that her mother did not have the capacity to execute this second will. On the evidence, medical and otherwise, the court held that Harlow's mother was so enfeebled that she could not form rational thoughts. Accordingly, the second will was held to be invalid, and the first was to be the last will and testament of the deceased.

== See also ==
- South African law of succession
