= Tshabalala v Tshabalala =

South African legal case

In Tshabalala v Tshabalala, an important case in the South African law of succession, the will in question comprised two pages, but the commissioner signed only the second page and neglected to sign the first page, which actually contained the contents of the will. The will was thus rejected.

The testator’s granddaughter (the sole heiress in the will) sought an order from the court declaring the will valid. The court held that the will did not comply with the statutory formalities, and was thus invalid; accordingly, the deceased was held to have died intestate.
