= Ex parte Naude =

Ex parte Naude was an important case in South African succession law. It involved a testator who had set aside three of the shares into which he had divided his estate. This was done for the purpose of establishing a trust fund—with power to the trustees to invest the capital constituting the trust—and an obligation imposed upon them to use the interest derived from the investments for certain specified purposes. In the event of a surplus of interest over and above the amount required for the said purposes, they were to apply the surplus in augmentation of the trust fund. The capital of the fund, however, was not to exceed £50,000.

It appeared that the value of the said three shares of the estate far exceeded £50,000, that there was already in the hands of the trustees a capital amount of £58,615, and that a further amount could be expected on the completion of the liquidation of the estate. It appeared further that the aforesaid compulsory annual interest payments amounted only to £616, so that there was an annual surplus of interest in the hands of the trustees in an amount of £7,777 which thus fell to be dealt with according to their discretion.

The court granted the trustees’ application for authority to increase the capital amount of the fund, by means of any capital already received from the estate, or to be received from it, so as to permit of the capital amount of the fund exceeding £50,000.

== See also ==
- South African succession law
