= Ex parte Stephens' Estate =

South African legal case

In Ex parte Stephens' Estate, an important case in the South African law of succession, the deceased disposed of his estate in terms of fractions, but only provided for nine tenths of the estate. One tenth, therefore, was not provided for. It was argued that it should be divided among the named beneficiaries in the will.

The court held that the Roman law nemo pro parte rule did not apply in South Africa; therefore, the estate was to be divided partly testate and partly intestate. Had the court divided the remaining one tenth between the nine beneficiaries, it would effectively have been rectifying the will. It held, accordingly, that the remaining one tenth was to be devolved in terms of the law of intestate succession.

== See also ==
- South African succession law
