= Ex parte Steenkamp and Steenkamp =

South African legal case

In Ex Parte Steenkamp and Steenkamp, an important case in the South African law of succession, Mr. and Mrs. K. bequeathed a farm and certain movable property to their children born and to be born of their daughter. Their son-in-law subsequently murdered Mr. and Mrs. K. At the time of their deaths, Mr. and Mrs. K's daughter and son-in-law had two children, and the daughter was pregnant with a third child. The nasciturus was born alive, but died when it was six months old. In terms of the Intestate Succession Act, Mr. and Mrs. K.’s daughter and son-in-law would inherit from their infant child.

The question before the court was whether this was permissible, as the son-in-law would indirectly benefit from the murders he committed. Three main issues were dealt with in Steyn J.’s judgment:

1. Can a murderer inherit form the heir of his victim? The court looked into the old authorities and concluded that this is possible, and what law principles the dispute featured.
1. Did the child's relationship to the grandparents bring them within the category of conjunctissima? Upon the facts, the relationship did not bring them within the category of conjunctissima, but under different circumstances it may be brought under this category, as would be the case, for example, if the grandparents had raised the child as their own.
1. Was there a causal nexus between the murder and the enrichment? The court held that a causal nexus must be shown and that in this case, although there was factual causation, the legal cause of the enrichment was not the murders but rather the birth and death of the child.

Accordingly, the court held that the son-in-law could inherit from the child.

This judgment has been severely criticized. Writers believe that there was no novus actus interveniens, and therefore that there was legal causation.

== See also ==
- South African law of succession
