= Ex Parte McDonald =

Important case in law of succession in South African legal system

Ex parte Estate late McDonald 1945 NPD 348, sometimes called Ex Parte McDonald was an important case in the South African law of succession, in which the testator bequeathed his entire estate to a trust subject to the granting of a usufruct in favour of his wife, so long as she remained unmarried, in which she received the full use and enjoyment of the income of his estate. Her life interest was subject to the condition that she should provide for, maintain and educate the children during their respective minorities.

The capital of the estate was, subject to the widow's life interest, bequeathed to their two children equally. In terms of the will, the trustees were to retain the family farm "Greyburn," the stock and equipment, and maintain the farm for the benefit of the family.

Before his death, the family ran into huge financial difficulties, and sold much of the stock and equipment, with the result that, at the time of his death, the farm was very deficient in cattle and implements.

Since the testator's death, the farm had been in charge of a caretaker at a cost of £20 a month, and had produced no income at all. It was said that it would be impossible to get a competent and reliable manager at a salary of less than £300 a year, and that on those terms, even if the farm were re-stocked and re-equipped, it was very questionable whether it would produce anything like an income anything like adequate for the purposes contemplated by the testator.

Moreover, since the death of the testator, his widow had been obliged for health reasons to reside elsewhere, and the medical evidence was that, in all probability, her health required that she should in the future continue to reside elsewhere than on the farm.

The court granted the trustees leave to sell the farm, on the grounds that, if the terms of the will were to be carried out strictly in accordance with their letter, the over-riding intention of the testator would be largely, if not entirely, defeated.

== See also ==
- South African law of succession
