= Kidwell v The Master =

South African legal case

In Kidwell v The Master, an important case in the South African law of succession, the testator had signed right at the bottom of the will; there was about 17 centimetres (6.7 in) between the end of the will (which included the witnesses’ signatures) and the testator's signature. The question before the court was where the end of the will was. The court held that the will was invalid as it did not comply with section 2(1)(a)(i) of the Wills Act. The decision has been criticised as overly formalistic by some commentators, who believe the overriding criteria for the courts should be to give effect to the wishes of the testator, and this case did not do this over something seemingly insignificant.

== See also ==
- South African law of succession

== Notes ==
- Kidwell v The Master 1983 (1) SA 509 (E).
