= Garfinkle v Estate Garfinkle =

In Garfinkle v Estate Garfinkle 1936 1 PH G5 (C), an important case in the South African law of succession. The testator had a shop attached to his house and a large sum of money. The will stated that the shop was to be advertised for hire by tender and the minimum price acceptable was 30 shilling per month, plus a 500-pound security deposit. Furthermore, the will stated that the prospective lease was to provide three certificates, stating that he was of good character, from a teacher, magistrate and a priest.

The prospective lessee was also required to continue making "Garfinkle's Improved Aerated Drink," and to be the librarian of the library on the property. In this regard, the prospective lessee ought to keep the books under lock and key and only allow persons to peruse them if under constant supervision. Furthermore, the money was to be kept in the post office forever.

As a result of the conditions attached to the shop, no tenders were received, so the executors of the estate sought to declare the conditions invalid. The court held that the conditions were impossible to fulfill due to the complex and onerous burden imposed on any prospective lessee. Thus the testator was held to have died intestate.

== See also ==
- South African law of succession
