= Estate Orpen v Estate Atkinson =

South African legal case

In Estate Orpen v Estate Atkinson, an important case in the South African law of succession, the testators, the Atkinsons, massed their estates in a joint will. They had one child, a daughter. According to the stipulations of the will, the massed estate would, upon the death of Mr. Atkinson, should he die first, be handed over to the executors of the estate, who would act as trustees; a trust was thus created.

From the moment of death of the testator, Mrs. Atkinson, also a testator, and the daughter would receive the income of the trust in equal parts as beneficiaries. Should one of them have died, the survivor would receive the whole of the trust income for the rest of her life. Should the daughter have died, the whole trust (the corpus) would go to her children in equal shares, subject to the usufruct of Mrs. Atkinson should she still be alive.

The will also stipulated that if the daughter should, upon death, have no children, twenty per cent of the trust capital (corpus) would go to such person as the daughter might designate in her will. She therefore obtained a power of appointment in her parents' will with regard to twenty per cent of the corpus of the trust. The destination of the other eighty per cent was arranged for in the parents' will.

On 5 March 1963, while her father was still alive, the daughter (Mrs. Orpen) made a will in which, with reference to her power of appointment, she bequeathed the twenty per cent trust capital to her husband, Mr. Orpen. She thus exercised her power of appointment in favour of her spouse. Mrs. Orpen died on 23 March 1963 without children. Her father, Mr. Atkinson, the creator of the power of appointment, died on 9 November 1963. Mr. Orpen died on 23 December 1964.

The legal question was whether the exercise of Mrs. Orpen's power of appointment in favour of Mr. Orpen, in terms of her father's will, was valid, and whether her spouse's deceased estate had obtained vested rights with regard to the twenty per cent trust capital that she bequeathed to him, regardless of the fact that she died before her father. Her father was therefore still alive when her will, in which she exercised her power of appointment, came into operation.

The Court held that Mr. Orpen's estate had no right to twenty per cent of the trust capital. Mrs. Orpen obtained her "power" from her father; she could not exercise it unless she survived her father. Because he was still alive when she died, she could not exercise rights left to her in his will. She could only validly exercise her rights if she survived him.
