= Ex Parte Lutchman =

South African legal case

In Ex Parte Lutchman, an important case in South African succession law, the deceased had left certain property to his six children in equal shares in a validly executed will. One of the deceased's children took out three life insurance policies on his father's life and explained to his father that in order for him (the son) to get the benefits of the policies when he (the father) died, he (the father) must draft a new will. The only provision in the second will was that the son was appointed the sole heir of the insurance policies, so he did not deal with any of the rest of his estate. Furthermore, he accidentally included a revocation clause in the new will, so its effect was that everything except the insurance policies devolved according to the law of intestate succession. At that stage, extra-marital children of persons marriage in terms of Hindu custom could not inherit intestate. The children of the deceased approached the court to declare the second will invalid insofar as it revoked the previous will. The court held that the revocation clause in the second will was obviously a mistake, so this clause was held to be pro non scripto (as if it had not been written).

== See also ==
- South African succession law
