= Botha v The Master =

In Botha v The Master, an important case in the South African law of succession, the testator created a trust in his will for the maintenance of his wife and the education of his nephews (whom he named). The testator was aware of the fact that all the named nephews already had tertiary degrees and were older than thirty-six. The court accepted certain evidence of a letter written by the testator in which he stated that his intention was to benefit the children of his named nephews. The nephews asked the court to rectify the will by adding the words “the sons of” into the bequest. The court held that the will as it stood did not reflect the intention of the testator, so the words were inserted.

== See also ==
- South African law of succession
