= Pillay v Nagan =

South African legal case

In Pillay v Nagan, an important case in the South African law of succession, Nagan forged his mother's will and subsequently told people that he had done so. His siblings then approached the court to declare Nagan unworthy of inheriting. The court held that Nagan's fraudulent act was sufficient to declare him unworthy of inheriting.

== See also ==
- South African law of succession

== Sources ==
- Pillay v Nagan 2001 (1) SA 410 (D).
