= Ex Parte Maurice =

South African legal case

In Ex Parte Maurice, an important case in South African succession law, the facts were these: A few weeks before his death, the deceased forwarded a draft of his will in his own handwriting to a building society, along with a letter asking them to “knock this document into shape and finalise it in legal jargon.” The question before the court was whether it should exercise its discretion to declare the will valid, even though it had not been signed by any witnesses, etc. The court held that there are three requirements which must be fulfilled before condonation is given:

1. The document must be drafted or executed by a person
2. who has since died;
3. and who intended the document to be his will.

The court held that the document was merely a draft; there was still work to be done on it, so it was not the final will and testament of the deceased. Accordingly, the court did not declare the will valid.

== See also ==
- South African succession law
