= Ex Parte Meier =

Case in South African succession law

Ex Parte Meier en Andere
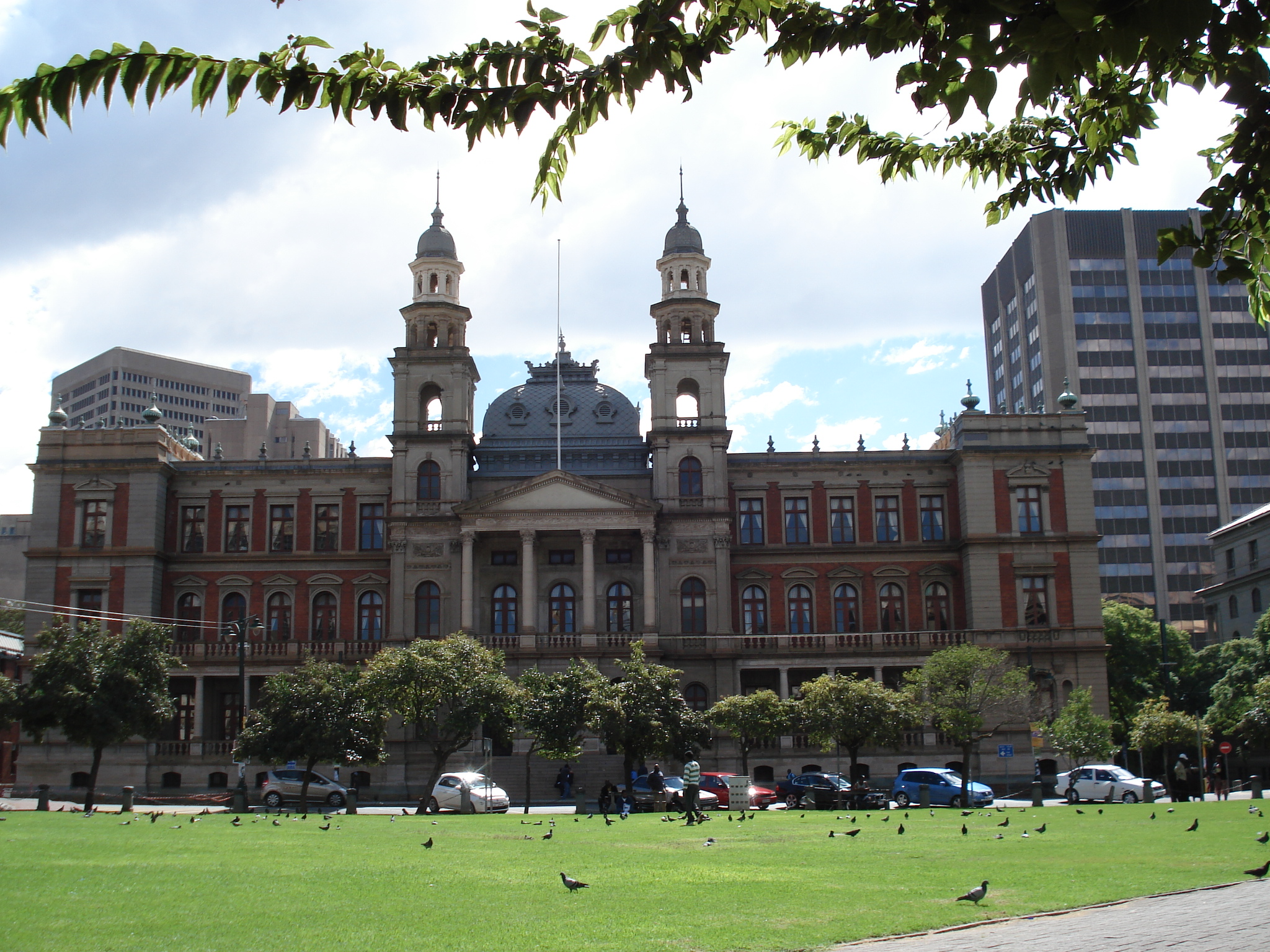
- Court: Transvaal Provincial Division
- Decided: 20 March 1980
- Citation: 1980 (3) SA 154 (T)

Court membership
- Judge sitting: Van Reenen J

Keywords
- Heir, Indignus, Succession, Inheritance

Ex Parte Meier en Andere, an important case in South African succession law, concerned an application for the appointment of a curator bonis to manage the estate of a patient, one Armin Karel Meier. An order was also claimed that the patient was entitled to inherit from his father's estate. It appeared that the patient, while mentally disturbed, had on May 18, 1977, shot and killed his father, in "an apparently unmotivated, cold-blooded shooting." Utilising the maxim “waar daar geen skuld is nie, is daar geen stra nie”—where there is no fault, there is no punishment—the court held that the patient was not an indignus, and that he lacked the criminal responsibility to be found guilty of the crime. Accordingly, he was entitled to inherit from his father's estate.

The matter was heard on January 18, 1980. The applicants' attorneys were Savage, Jooste & Adams. MC de Klerk appeared for the applicant, PP Delport for the curator ad litem.

== See also ==
- Law of succession in South Africa
