= Ex Parte Graham =

South African legal case

Ex Parte Graham 1963 (4) SA 145 (D) is an important case in the South African law of persons and succession. Briefly, the deceased left a will stipulating that her adopted son would inherit her estate in the event of her death. The will added, however, that, if he predeceased her, her mother would inherit the estate.

The deceased and her son subsequently died in a plane crash, and the Registrar sought an order declaring that they had died simultaneously. This order was granted.

== See also ==
- South African law of persons
- South African law of succession

== Notes ==
All Sa
