= Barclays Bank v Anderson =

South African legal case

In Barclays Bank DC & O NO v Anderson 1959 2 SA 478 (T), sometimes called Barclays Bank v Anderson, an important case in the South African law of succession, the court said that conditions excluding the jurisdiction of the court are against public policy and are thus invalid. Furthermore, it was stated that the appropriate way to resolve bad-faith attacks is to grant a costs order against the party who acted in bad faith. in clause 12(b) of the will it was provided that every beneficiary "shall....personally, permanently and beneficially occupy" the land bequeathed to him/her. In clause 12(c) it was provided that should a beneficiary fail to occupy his/her land, he/she would lose all right and claim to his/her portion of the farm.

== Notes ==
- Barclays Bank v Anderson 1959 2 SA 478 (T)
- (1994) 9 SA Public Law 67
