= Theron v Master of the High Court =

South African legal case

In Theron v The Master (2001), an important case in the South African law of succession, Mr and Mrs Theron were married in community of property. Mr Theron died and left certain property to his grandson in a trust. Mr Theron's son was appointed as the trustee, and had signed the will as a witness. Mrs Theron sought an order declaring that their son could benefit from the will (i.e. be appointed the trustee) despite signing as a witness.

The court considered the facts and held that the testator was not defrauded or unduly influenced; therefore the deceased's son was competent to be appointed as the trustee of the trust, despite having signed as a witness.

== See also ==
- Law of succession in South Africa
