= Testamentary disposition =

Gift under the terms of a will

A testamentary disposition is any gift of any property by a testator under the terms of a will.

== Types ==
Types of testamentary dispositions include:

- Gift (law), assets that have been legally transferred from one person to another
- Legacy, testamentary gift of personal property, traditionally of money but may be real or personal property
- Life estate, a concept used in common and statutory law to designate the ownership of land for the duration of a person's life
- Demonstrative legacy, a gift of a specific sum of money with a direction that is to be paid out of a particular fund

== See also ==
- Testator
- Codicil (will)
