= Testator =

Person who makes a will

A testator (/tɛsˈteɪtɔːr/) is a person who has written and executed a last will and testament that is in effect at the time of their death. It is any "person who makes a will."

== Related terms ==
- A female testator is sometimes referred to as a testatrix (/tɛsˈteɪtrɪks/), plural testatrices (/tɛstəˈtraɪsiːs/), particularly in older cases.
- In Ahmadiyya Islam, a testator is referred to as a moosi, who is someone that has signed up for Wasiyyat or a will, under the plan initiated by the Promised Messiah, thus committing a portion, not less than one-tenth, of his lifetime earnings and any property to a cause.
- The adjectival form of the word is testamentary, as in:
1. Testamentary capacity, or mental capacity or ability to execute a will and
2. Testamentary disposition, or gift made in a will (see that article for types).
3. Testamentary trust, a trust that is created in a will.
- A will is also known as a last will and testament.
- Testacy means the status of being testate, that is, having executed a will. The property of such a person goes through the probate process.
- Intestacy means the status of not having made a will, or to have died without a valid will. The estate of a person who dies intestate, undergoes administration, rather than probate.
- The attestation clause of a will is where the witnesses to a will attest to certain facts concerning the making of the will by the testator, and where they sign their names as witnesses.

== See also ==
- Witnessing of a testator's will
