= Law of succession in South Africa =

Law regarding estate inheritance

The South African law of succession prescribes the rules which determine the devolution of a person's estate after his death, and all matters incidental thereto. It identifies the beneficiaries who are entitled to succeed to the deceased's estate, and the extent of the benefits they are to receive, and determines the different rights and duties that persons (for example, beneficiaries and creditors) may have in a deceased's estate. It forms part of private law.

The manner in which assets are distributed depends on whether the deceased has left a valid will or other valid document containing testamentary provisions, such as an antenuptial contract. If the deceased has not left a valid will or valid document containing testamentary provisions, the deceased dies intestate; similarly, if the deceased leaves a valid will which does not dispose of all property, there is an intestacy as to the portion not disposed of. In the event of intestacy, the assets are distributed in a definite order of preference among the heirs, as stipulated by the Intestate Succession Act, 1987. Until recently, the Act (and its common-law precursor) existed side by side with a statutorily-regulated customary-law regime of intestate succession, applied on a racial basis, but this was brought to an end when the Constitutional Court, in Bhe v Magistrate, Khayelitsha, made the Intestate Succession Act applicable to all.

Where the deceased dies leaving a valid will, the rules of testate succession apply. These are derived from common law and the Wills Act, 1953. Testate succession is governed by the general premise that the assets of the deceased are distributed in accordance with the provisions of the will. If specified property is left to a person, the disposition is termed a "legacy." Legacies are distributed first; any residue in the estate is given to the person, if any, who is appointed as heir. If the will appoints more than one heir, the residue is divided among them.

== Dual character ==
The law of succession comprises two branches, namely the common law of succession and the customary law of succession. These enjoy equal status and are subject to the Constitution of South Africa and other legislation. The common law of succession is divided into the testate law of succession and the intestate law of succession, whereas the customary law of succession only operates intestate.

== Conflict of laws ==
There are various rules for determining whether the common-law rules or the customary-law rules are applicable:

- The common law of succession applies to testate succession except if a testator, living under customary law prescribed otherwise in his or her will or if a court decides otherwise.
- The Intestate Succession Act applies to all intestate estates irrespective of the cultural affiliations of the deceased.

Succession may take place in three ways:

1. in accordance with a valid will (testamentary succession);
2. through the operation of intestate succession (without a valid will); and
3. in terms of a succession agreement (pactum successorium) contained in a duly registered antenuptial contract or a gift mortis causa.

== Scope of succession ==
The capacity to have rights and duties is called legal subjectivity, which is terminated by death. The consequences of the termination of legal subjectivity are as follows:

- The subject is known as the deceased.
- If the deceased has a valid will, he or she is known as a testator or testatrix respectively.
- The deceased's estate—all of the deceased's assets and liabilities—is gathered together.
- The deceased's debts and administration costs are paid.
- The remainder of the assets then pass to persons qualified to succeed him.

When a person dies, everything remaining of his assets (once debts, obligations and administrative costs have been reclaimed) passes by inheritance to those qualified to succeed him.

The law of succession is the totality of the legal rules which control the transfer of those assets of the deceased which are subject to distribution among beneficiaries, or those assets of another over which the deceased had the power of disposal.

If there is a valid will which sets out the wishes of the testator, the estate is administered in terms of the law of testate succession. A will is a unilateral declaration regarding how the estate is to be apportioned. A person may make also bequests in terms of an ante-nuptial contract. Both natural and juristic persons may be beneficiaries in terms of a will.

If there is no will, or if the will is invalid, the estate devolves in terms of the law of intestate succession.

== Ground rules for succession ==
There are a few requirements (with exceptions) that must be fulfilled before the rules of succession can come into operation:

- The testator must have died.
- There must be a transfer of rights or duties with regard to the estate or the status of the deceased, depending on the nature of the succession rules (common law or customary law).
- At the time of dies cedit, the beneficiary has to be alive or have been conceived.
- The beneficiary must be competent to inherit. (According to the Dutch rule de bloedige hand neemt geen erf a person convicted of either the murder or culpable homicide of the testator is not eligible to inherit.)

=== Person must have died ===
In both the common and customary law of succession (in the case of property), a prerequisite for succession is that the owner of the estate must have died. In customary law, succession to status positions takes place only on the death of a family head, while the deaths of another family member does not give rise to succession to his or her status. The application of the rule is illustrated in Estate Orpen v Estate Atkinson.

Although the requirement of the death of the testator seems so obvious, it is not always a simple matter. There are various examples of situations where the application of the rule has been problematic or deviated from.

==== Presumption of death ====
The first exception to the rule that a person must be dead before succession can occur, is where a court pronounces a presumption of death and makes an order for the division of the estate. Those who allege that a person is dead have to prove it. Where the body is present and can be identified, death can easily be proved. However, where a person has disappeared and a body has not been found, death is difficult to prove. Only when a court makes a presumption of death order can the disappeared person's estate be administered. Because it is possible that the deceased might still be alive, this case constitutes an exception to the rule that he or she must be dead before succession can occur. For this reason, it is also customary for a court to order that the estate of the person presumed to be dead should be distributed amongst his heirs subject to the provision of security that the estate can be returned to him should he reappear. Factors which a court may take into consideration in making such an order include the length of time that the person has been missing, the age, health and position in society of the missing person, as well as the circumstances of the disappearance. The principles applicable to judicial presumption of death have been reviewed in detail by the higher courts.

Beneficiaries must be alive at the time of the testator's death, unless the testator makes provision for the benefit of persons born later. Death is proved by reporting the death to the Master and obtaining a death certificate signed by a medical practitioner. This is important: Without proof of death, the estate cannot be administered, and one's affairs cannot remain indefinitely in limbo.

In such circumstances, a person may approach the High Court for an order, granted on a balance of probabilities, presuming the death of another person. The effect of the order is to create a rebuttable presumption that the specified person is dead. The court may later reverse the order if the presumption is rebutted; it may also order that all persons who received a benefit from the devolved estate return the assets in terms of the law of unjustified enrichment.

If a person cannot get a presumption order, he may apply for an order for administration of the estate. In this case, all beneficiaries must furnish security for the assets received.

==== Estate massing ====
A second exception to the rule that a person must be dead can be found in the case of estate massing. When estates are massed, the entire estates or parts of the estates of various testators are consolidated into a single economic unit for the purpose of testamentary disposal. The effect of estate massing is that the surviving testator's estate dissolves according to the will of the first-dying whilst he or she is still alive.

Either party to a mutual will may, while both are alive, revoke his or her share of the mutual will with or without communication to the other party. But after the death of one party the survivor may not revoke his or her share of the mutual will where both the following further conditions or circumstances occur:

- the mutual will effects a "massing;" and
- the survivor has accepted some benefit under the will.

The term "massing" will first be explained, then the survivor's election will be discussed, and thereafter effect of the survivor repudiating or accepting benefits respectively will be considered.

Massing is a disposition by the testators in a mutual will of their joined property or of a portion of it in favour of the survivor, giving him or her a limited interest in the joined property, and providing that on his or her death such property is to go to some other person or persons. The limited interest conferred on the survivor is, as a rule, either a usufructuary or a fiduciary interest. For example, the testators leave "all property belonging to us to our children, subject to a usufruct in favour of the survivor;" in this case the survivor acquires a usufructuary interest in the massed property. Or, again, the testators may leave "our joint estate to the survivor, and after the death of the survivor to our children;" in this case the survivor acquires a fiduciary interest.

It will be seen that the effect of massing, if carried out, is to give the survivor one benefit and to deprive him or her of another. The survivor acquires a beneficial interest in the property of the first-dying which otherwise (in the absence of any will) the survivor would not have obtained, but the survivor no longer has the full ownership of his or her own share of the property which otherwise he or she would have retained. The survivor, however, is not bound to allow the mutual will to be carried into effect. If the survivor accepts the benefit, he or she must also accept the loss of an interest in his or her own property; the survivor cannot accept the benefit without its accompanying liability. It follows that the survivor has a choice or election whether to abide by the terms of the mutual will or to repudiate them.

===== Exercise of election by survivor =====
Whether the survivor has elected to abide by the terms of the mutual will or to repudiate them is a question of fact. The election is generally effected by the survivor in his or her capacity as executor (for the survivor is usually appointed executor testamentary) in framing the liquidation and distribution account. If the survivor takes the interest in the share of the first-dying in terms of the mutual will the survivor is deemed to have accepted the benefits and to have adiated. Vice versa, the survivor is held to repudiate the terms of the will if he or she does not take the interest in the share of the first-dying but assigns the estate of the deceased to the other beneficiaries.

If the survivor elects to abide by the will, or "adiates," the survivor can be relieved of the consequences of such action if the survivor acted under a reasonable and excusable ignorance of his or her legal rights, but not if the survivor erroneously thought that adiation would be of greater benefit than it turned out to be. If, after adiation, a new will is discovered which adds to or alters the provisions of the earlier will, the survivor has a further opportunity to adiate or repudiate.

===== Effect of repudiation by survivor =====
If the survivor elects to take no benefit under the mutual will and thereby repudiates the will he or she is not bound by its terms. It follows that the survivor reverts to the legal position which he enjoyed before the death of the testator. The survivor accordingly may revoke his or her share of the mutual will, retain personal property and be free of the will's terms. The consequence is that the mutual will remains in force only in so far as it is the will of the first-dying and it operates only upon the latter's share of the property.

===== Effect of adiation by survivor =====
If the survivor accepts the benefits under the mutual will he or she becomes bound by its terms. The survivor is consequently under an obligation (of a contractual or quasi-contractual nature) to allow the jointly disposed of property to devolve in terms of the joint will. In other words, the mutual will now comes fully into operation and the survivor cannot revoke his or her share of it. The mutual will operates in effect as the will of the first-dying party and the survivor is a beneficiary under that will.

The rights of the ultimate beneficiaries in the massed estate have undergone considerable change. Under the common law their rights in the first-dying testator's share of the massed property were real rights, being conferred by will, while their right in the survivor's share were personal rights only since they were of a semi-contractual nature and since the will of one person cannot confer a real right in the property of another person. It followed that the survivor retained the dominium in his or her share of the property even after adiation, and could thus validly alienate or mortgage such share. If the survivor went insolvent after adiation and before transfer of the property to’ the beneficiaries the latter would rank merely as concurrent creditors in the insolvent estate. To remedy this state of affairs a vitally important change was made in 1913 by the Administration of Estates Act in respect of mutual wills of spouses married in community of property. Where such a will effected a massing and the survivor adiated, the Act in effect placed the two halves of the joint estate upon exactly the same footing by giving the beneficiaries the same rights in respect of the survivor's half as they possessed in the half of the first-dying spouse. Given the state of the common law at the time this meant that the beneficiaries acquired real rights in the entire estate. Under the modern system of administering deceased estates, however, the beneficiaries under a will acquire only personal rights against the executor before transfer to them of the bequeathed property.

It follows in the case of a massed estate that the ultimate beneficiaries acquire personal rights only in the first-dying's share of the estate and thus, by virtue of the legislation, in the half of the survivor too, on his or her adiation. This remains the position under the Administration of Estates Act of 1965, which re-enacted the earlier provision in somewhat wider terms, as follows: "If any two or more persons have by their mutual will massed the whole or any specific portion of their joint estate and disposed of the massed estate or of any portion thereof after the death of the first-dying, conferring upon the survivor or survivors any limited interest in respect of any property in the massed estate, then upon the death after the commencement of this Act [October 2, 1967] of the first-dying, adiation by the survivor or survivors shall have the effect of conferring upon the persons in whose favour such disposition was made, such rights in respect of any property forming part of the share of the survivor or survivors of the massed estate as they would by law have possessed under the will if that property had belonged to the first-dying."

The 1965 Act, unlike the 1913 Act, is not, it is submitted, confined to spouses married in community of property despite the use of the words "joint estate" in the quoted extract. The intention of the legislature seems clear.

If the mutual will masses not the whole, but a portion merely of their estates, the will is irrevocable by the survivor in respect of the massed portion only.

==== Sequence of death ====
Another aspect worth mentioning, occurs when a number of people are killed in the same disaster (commorientes) and it is difficult to determine who died first. It might be important to be able to determine who died first in order to choose the beneficiaries, especially if the victims are family members. It could happen that the estate of the victims is devolved as if they died simultaneously whilst in fact one or more of them died at a later time.

Consider the following example: Corbin and Armand die in a plane crash in which there are no survivors. In terms of Corbin's will, Cameron is his only heir. Corbin's estate is only worth R100. In terms of Armand's will, Corbin is her only heir, and Armand was wealthy. If Corbin died after Armand and could first inherit from him, then Cameron, who inherits from Corbin, is in a favourable position. Cameron would want to prove that Armand died before Corbin. If Corbin and Armand died simultaneously and on impact, Corbin cannot inherit anything from Armand, as he was not alive at dies cedit: that is, upon Armand's death.

The cardinal rule is that an heir, in order to inherit, must survive or outlive the deceased. When two persons die at the same time, it is important to know who died first, so as to determine if they may inherit.

In Roman-Dutch law, certain presumptions existed when members of the same family died in circumstances where it was difficult to determine who died first. It was always presumed that the wife died first. In England, there was a presumption that, when two persons died at the same time, the older of the two had died first.

The South African courts, however, did not apply these presumptions. The general rule is that, where there is no evidence of who survived whom, it is to be presumed that they died simultaneously. In Greyling v Greyling, a husband and wife were killed in a car accident. According to the evidence, the husband probably lived longer than his wife. In their joint will, the spouses had a provision to the effect that, if they died simultaneously, their estate had to devolve in a certain way. The Court held that the words ‘gelyktydig te sterwe kom’ (to die simultaneously) meant the death of the testators as the result of a single incident, irrespective of the fact that there was a difference in the exact time at which they died.

=== Transfer of rights and/or duties with regard to assets and/or the status of the deceased ===
This ground rule is linked to the issue of dies cedit and dies venit. The fact that there has to be a transfer of rights and/or duties with regard to the bequest and/or status of the deceased can also be regarded as a ground rule of the law of succession. Somebody must take the place of the deceased testator with regard to ownership of his assets, or in the case of customary law, with regard to status. In the case of the common law of succession, there is a transfer of rights (and sometimes also responsibilities) which belonged to the deceased.

In the case of the customary law of succession, the situation is more complicated. It depends on the type of property and the status of the deceased. In general, it can be said that succession to status positions takes place only after the death of a family head. Distinction is made between general succession (succession to the general status of the deceased) and special succession (succession to the position of the head of the various houses of the deceased). Although there have been exceptions to the rule, succession to status is mainly limited to male. Succession follows the rule of male primogeniture, which means that a family head is succeeded by his firstborn son of a particular house.

=== Beneficiary should at the time of dies cedit be alive or have been conceived ===
The transfer of rights (and occasionally also responsibilities) is a prerequisite for succession. There must be somebody on whom the rights (or responsibilities) can devolve. Where a beneficiary has already died (is predeceased) when the bequeathed benefit vests, there can be no succession except if the deceased made provision in his or her will or antenuptial contract for the predecease of the beneficiary or in circumstances where ex lege substitution applies.

An exceptional situation is where a beneficiary has been conceived but not yet born when the bequeathed benefit vests. Since an unborn child is incapable of bearing rights and cannot inherit, the vesting of the bequest is held over until the child is born alive. This situation is referred to as the nasciturus fiction (a common law concept) in terms of which a child who survives birth is regarded as having obtained rights from the moment of conception, provided that conception took place before the death of the testator.

Customary law does not have a similar fiction, but some communities have customs that are meant to produce heirs for a husband after his death. Ukungena, for example, is a custom which expects a widow to marry one of her husband's brothers after his death. If a man dies childless, the custom of ukungena allows for the continuation of his family line. Another custom, ukuvusa, allows for the natural heir of the deceased (for example, his brother) to take the deceased's property and then to take a wife who will be regarded as the deceased's wife and whose children will be known as the deceased's children. It is, however, difficult to determine to what extent these customs are still followed by indigenous communities. In addition, the nasciturus fiction has been codified in the testate law of succession by section 2D(l)(c) of the Wills Act, which provides that any benefit allocated to the children of a deceased shall vest in such children as are alive at the time of the devolution of the benefit, or as have already been conceived at the time of the devolution of the benefit and who are later born alive.

=== Beneficiary must be competent to inherit ===
The mere fact that somebody has been named as heir or legatee in a will, or in terms of the rules of intestate succession, does not necessarily mean that the person has the right to the relevant benefit. Although most persons are competent to inherit, there are some who do not have the competence to take up a benefit in terms of a specific will. There are also certain persons who are not competent to benefit intestate from a specific deceased.

In customary law, the competence of the beneficiary is often linked to the rule of male primogeniture. The customary rule of male primogeniture was declared unconstitutional by the Constitutional Court in Bhe v Magistrate, Khayelitsha. This case brought about fundamental changes to the customary law of succession and the administration of estates.

== Deceased estate ==
The aggregate of assets and liabilities of the deceased is termed the deceased estate. The deceased estate is not a juristic person. Consequently, the only legal person in connection with the estate is the executor in his representative capacity. The estate ‘vests’ originally in the Master of the High Court, and subsequently in one or more executors, appointed by the Master, who bear the responsibility of administering the estate:

- first, by gathering in all the assets;
- next, by liquidating the deceased's liabilities; and
- lastly, by distributing the balance of the estate assets to the beneficiaries entitled thereto.

Due to this administration process, the estate does not initially vest in the heir. The executor becomes the legal ‘owner’ of the assets. The executor, however, acquires the bare dominium only, and not the beneficial use and enjoyment of the assets. Similarly, the debts of the deceased are binding on the executor in his representative capacity only.

It follows that the executor alone can sue and be sued in respect of estate matters. Legal proceedings are brought or defended by the executor acting in a representative capacity, for the executor is the legal representative of the deceased. A legatee, for example, has no locus standi to claim from a third person assets which the former alleges to form part of the estate; still less does the heir acquire the ownership of the assets upon the death of the testator: The heir has merely a vested claim (personal right) against the executor, enforceable after confirmation of the liquidation and distribution account.

== Executor ==
The estates of all persons, whether dying testate or intestate, are administered and wound up by executors under letters of executorship granted to them by the Master of the High Court. If the deceased's will appoints specified persons as executors, the Master grants the letters to such persons; they are termed executors testamentary.

Where no executors are appointed by will, and after consulting the heirs, the legatees and the creditors of the deceased, the Master appoints one or more persons as executors; they are termed executors dative.

Executors testamentary who are conferred the power of assumption by a will may appoint co-executors; the latter are termed executors assumed.

== Winding up ==
An estate is wound up when it has fallen into possession and is cleared of liabilities, and so left free for enjoyment by the beneficiaries. The executor's first duty is to gather in all the estate's assets in the possession of other persons, unless the Master of the High Court authorises such other persons to retain the property. Excluded from ingathering are life assurance benefits, retirement assets, and assets held in trust.

Debts due to the deceased include not merely pecuniary debts, but also any other obligations which can be specifically performed, such as an obligation to transfer land to the deceased. The executor may enforce such an obligation even if the deceased has died insolvent.

It is not the duty of an executor to realise the estate assets—that is, to turn them into money—unless the will directs him to do so, or unless it is necessary to raise money in order either to pay estate debts or to divide the assets properly among the beneficiaries. If empowered by the will, the executor may carry on the business of the testator, but without the authority of the court he may not pledge the credit of the estate in order to maintain it as a going concern.

=== Liquidation ===
The next duty of the executor is to settle the liabilities against the deceased's estate, after satisfying himself that the estate is solvent, and after framing and lodging a liquidation and distribution account, to which there has been no valid objection, with the Master of the High Court within six months from the date of death.

An executor is liable in respect of any contractual obligation of the deceased which could have been enforced against him had he been alive, unless the obligation is of a personal nature or was clearly not intended by the parties to be transmissible. It follows that the executor must not only pay the pecuniary debts of the deceased, but must also perform obligations incurred by the deceased to transfer or to grant real rights in his property (like a sale of his land, or a contract to grant a servitude over his land, or a lease, or a mortgage).

The debts due by the estate include the deceased's obligation to maintain his spouse and minor children (and, in appropriate circumstances, even major children) if the benefits coming to them from the deceased's estate are insufficient to maintain them. Such a claim is preferent to the claims of heirs and, if the inheritances are insufficient, to the claims of legatees, but it cannot compete with the claims of normal creditors.

The executor is liable for the debts only to the extent of the assets in the estate. If the estate is solvent, the executor must pay the creditors as soon as funds sufficient for that purpose have been raised out of the estate, subject to there being no valid objection to his liquidation and distribution account. If the executor does not have sufficient free cash in assets belonging to the estate in order to raise the necessary amount, but he may not sell assets bequeathed as legacies unless there are no other assets to meet the debts.

If the estate is insolvent, the executor must inform the creditors of this fact in writing; thereafter, provided he is instructed by a majority in number and value of all the creditors to surrender the estate under the Insolvency Act, he must realise and distribute the estate in terms of the procedure laid down for insolvent estates in the Administration of Estates Act.

=== Distribution ===
After lodging a liquidation and distribution account to which there has been no objection, or any objections made have been overruled by the court, the executor must distribute the balance of the assets to the beneficiaries. Where there is no will, the assets are distributed among the heirs according to the rules of intestate succession; where there is a will, the assets are distributed according to the provisions of that will. In the latter case, the legacies are paid or distributed first, the balance going to the heirs; the consequence is that the heirs are in effect residuary legatees.

The distribution of the assets to the beneficiaries is effected:

- by transferring immovable property to them;
- by delivering movable property to them; or
- by paying money to them,

as the case may be. If a usufruct or other limited interest in immovable property has been bequeathed to any person, along with a direction that, upon the expiry of the interest, the property shall devolve upon some uncertain person, the executor must, instead of transferring the property, ensure that the terms of the will are endorsed against the title deeds. An endorsement is intended to safeguard the contingent rights of the uncertain persons; it does not vest the ownership or any other real right in them.

=== Beneficiaries’ title ===
Under the Roman-Dutch system of universal succession, the beneficiaries’ right to their portions of the deceased's assets was a real right, since the right was said to vest in the beneficiaries at the death of the deceased, without any formal delivery or transfer; so it was said that a real right is conferred on the beneficiaries, be they legatees or heirs.

However, after adoption of the English system of estate administration in the 19th century, the beneficiaries’ right to inherit is no longer absolute, nor is it assured. If the deceased's estate, after confirmation of the liquidation and distribution account, is found to be insolvent, none of the beneficiaries will obtain any assets at all. In the case of a legacy, the legatee will obtain the property bequeathed to him only:

1. if the property belonged to the testator (for the will of one person cannot confer a real right in favour of another person over property belonging to a third person); and
2. if the deceased's assets not left as legacies are sufficient to pay his debts.

In any event, an heir may not vindicate from a third person property which the heir alleges forms part of the deceased estate; only the executor has that power.

It follows from these considerations that an heir or legatee does not, upon the death of the testator, acquire the ownership of the assets; he merely has a vested claim (personal right) against the executor for payment, delivery or transfer of the property comprising the inheritance. This claim is enforceable only when the liquidation and distribution account has been confirmed. The heir or legatee, in fact, becomes owner of movable property only on its delivery, and of immovable property on its registration.

The modern position, therefore, is that a beneficiary has merely a personal right, ius in personam ad rem acquirendam, against the executor; he does not acquire ownership by virtue of a will. The heir obtains ownership, or a lesser real right (such as a usufruct), only on delivery or transfer in pursuance of a testamentary disposition or intestate succession. Consequently, succession is merely a causa habilis, or appropriate cause, for transfer of ownership.

==== Overpayment by executor ====
If an executor pays the heirs or legatees more than they were entitled to, there is unjustified enrichtment, so the executor may recover the excess from them by means of the condictio indebiti. Similarly, an executor may reclaim from concurrent creditors an overpayment made to them if the estate is subsequently found to be insolvent.

==== Estate duty ====
By virtue of the Estate Duty Act, estate duty is payable on all property of a deceased person, and on all property which is deemed to be his property at the date of death.

=== Testamentary trustees ===
The executor's duty is finished when the estate has been liquidated and distributed. Once the estate is distributed, the executor is entitled to be discharged as executor by the Master. Frequently, however, a will directs that the estate property or some portion of it must not be distributed immediately, but must be administered by some person, who is termed the testamentary "trustee" or "administrator." It then becomes the duty of the executor to cause the terms of the will, insofar as they relate to the administration of the immovable property, to be endorsed against the title deeds of such immovable property.

The will usually, but not always, appoints the same persons as executors and as trustees. The functions of an executor and of a trustee are, however, quite separate and distinct. Further, the source of their authority is different. While the Master has the power of appointment of executors, a trustee's authority is derived from the will or some other document executed by the testator.

Where the executors are also appointed trustees, they first have to perform their duties as executors, and then as trustees. In the latter capacity, they have to administer and deal with the balance of the assets as directed by the will. The trustees must keep the assets properly invested, due regard being had to the production of fruits and the safety of the corpus of the estate.

A trustee must furnish security to the satisfaction of the Master for the due and faithful performance of his duties, unless he has been exempted from doing so by a court order or by the Master or in terms of the will. In the latter case, the Master may override the terms of the will and insist on security being furnished, if the Master is of the opinion that there are sound reasons for doing so.

== Collation ==
Collation (collatio bonorum or hotchpot) is an obligation imposed by law on all descendants who wish to share as heirs in the deceased's estate, either by will or on intestacy. The obligation is to account to the estate for any gifts or advances received by them from the deceased, or debts incurred to him, during his lifetime.

Collation is effected by adding to the inheritance the amount due by each heir. The new total is then divided among all the heirs. An heir cannot, as long as he refuses to collate, enforce legal remedies to claim his share of the inheritance.

The basis of collation is that a parent is presumed to have intended that there should be equality in the distribution of his estate among his children. Collation, however, may be dispensed with by the will of a testator, or waived by those entitled to the benefit thereof.

=== What property must be collated ===
Among the classes of property which must be collated is property which has been given to a descendant

- as a portion of his inheritance;
- to start him in trade or business;
- as a dowry or marriage gift; or
- as a gift of a substantial nature resulting in inequitable treatment so far as the other children are concerned.

A descendant is expected to collate debts due by him to the deceased, whether arising from contract, delict or any other source. This is the case even if the debt has prescribed by lapse of time, been extinguished under the provisions of the Agricultural Credit Act, or been discharged by the insolvency and the subsequent rehabilitation of the descendant.

Indeed, since the executor is obliged to recover all debts owing to the estate, for the benefit of creditors as well as beneficiaries, it is only debts that are not legally recoverable that should be collated. On the other hand, money spent on the maintenance of the descendant need not be collated; nor need money spent on his education, nor a simple and unconditional gift—provided that such expenditure is not substantial in relation to the deceased's means and disproportionate to what other descendants have received.

=== Who is liable to collate ===
The only persons liable to collate are descendants who are heirs on intestacy or legatees under a deceased's will (provided that they would have been his heirs had there been no will); and hence a grandchild, whose father is alive, and who is a legatee under his grandfather's will, need not collate. If his father is dead, however, he must collate not only what he has received from his grandfather, but also amounts his father received.

Collation applies only to heirs who have adiated. If an inheritance is repudiated, the heirs who receive the inheritance by accrual will be required to collate what the repudiating heir would have had to collate.

Legatees and pre-legatees are not liable to collate unless the will provides to the contrary.

=== Who benefits from collation ===
The only persons who may insist on collation, and share in the benefit thereof, are

- descendants who would themselves be under a duty to collate;

It follows, therefore, that legatees who are not obliged to collate, and the estate's creditors who can recover their debts in the ordinary course, cannot benefit from what is collated.

== Beneficiaries ==
=== Heirs and legatees ===
The persons upon whom the testator's inheritance devolves are the called the beneficiaries. Beneficiaries may be divided into two categories:

- heirs; and
- legatees.

Anyone may be appointed as an heir or a legatee, including a natural person, a fixed or fluctuating class of persons, a company, a public corporation or a government department.

==== Heirs ====
An heir inherits

- the entire inheritance;
- a proportional part of it;
- a particular part of it; or
- the residue of the inheritance.

A testator may nominate one heir or many heirs. An heir may be nominated in a will or in an antenuptial contract. An heir may also inherit intestate.

==== Legatees ====
Legatees are beneficiaries in testate succession only. They inherit a specific or determinable asset (like a car) or a specified amount of money (exactly R10,000, for example). A legatee may be nominated only in a will or in an ante-nuptial contract. It is not possible for legatees to exist where the deceased died intestate.

A pre-legacy is a special bequest which has preference over all other bequests in terms of the testamentary instructions.

The testator may only bequeath his assets, or the assets of a third party, by means of a legacy.

A legacy will fail under the following circumstances:

- if the testator voluntarily alienates the subject-matter of a legacy during his lifetime, in which case it is said that the legacy fails through ademption;
- if the legatee dies before the legacy passes to him or her;
- in the event that the legatee repudiates;
- in the event that the legatee is unfit to inherit;
- if the bequeathed asset is destroyed; and
- if the legacy is made for a specific purpose, which purpose becomes impossible to execute.

==== Differences and similarities ====
The differences between heirs and legatees may be summarised as follows:

- Heirs occur in both testate and intestate succession; legatees occur only in testate succession.
- After the estate debts are paid, the executor must pay the legatees first. The legatees, therefore, have a better right and are in a stronger position than heirs.
- At common law, heirs are obliged to collate: that is, to return any benefit received during the currency of the testator's life, over and above reasonable support and maintenance. Legatees do not have this obligation.

=== Adiation and repudiation ===
Heirs and legatees have no obligation to receive an inheritance; they have the choice to accept or reject what has been bequeathed. In this context,

- adiation refers to the acceptance of a benefit; and
- repudiation (or renunciation) refers to the refusal to accept a benefit, or the rejection or renunciation thereof.

==== Adiation ====
Acceptance of a benefit under a will, generally referred to as "adiation," is the act of a beneficiary in signifying an intention to take the benefit. A beneficiary is not obliged to accept a benefit under a will. However, if he accepts the benefit, he incurs any liability which may be involved in it. The general rule is that a person is assumed to have adiated unless he expressly repudiates. Nothing express or explicit is required by way of acceptance.

The acceptance of an unconditional benefit, therefore, is generally taken for granted, but not where the acceptance involves a liability, in which event the beneficiary has a choice or election whether to accept or to repudiate the benefit. For example, where the will leaves property to a person on condition that he or she pays a sum of money to another person, or that he or she gives another person some of his or her own property, or that he or she maintains and supports some other person.

The Wills Act provides that if any descendant of a testator, excluding a minor or mentally ill descendant, who together with the surviving spouse of the testator, is entitled a benefit in terms of the will, renounces his or her right to receive such a benefit, such benefit shall vest in the surviving spouse. Where the surviving spouse does not stand to inherit, and unless the will indicates otherwise, the renounced benefit must devolve on the descendants of that descendant per stirpes.

The effect of adiation is that the heir or legatee acquires a vested personal right against the executor for delivery of the asset once the estate has been liquidated.

==== Repudiation ====
The effect of repudiation is enunciated in the relevant provisions of the Wills Act and the Intestate Succession Act. The former provides as follows:

If any descendants of a testator, excluding a minor or a mentally ill descendant, who, together with the surviving spouse of the testator, is entitled to a benefit in terms of a will renounces his right to receive such benefit, such benefit shall vest in the surviving spouse.

If a descendant of the testator, whether as a member of a class or otherwise, would have been entitled to a benefit in terms of the provisions of a will if he had been alive at the time of death of the testator, or had not been disqualified from inheriting, or had not after the testator’s death renounced his right to receive such a benefit, the descendants of that descendant shall, subject to the provisions of subsection (1), per stirpes be entitled to the benefit, unless the context of the will otherwise indicates.

The Intestate Succession Act contains the following provisions:

If a descendant of a deceased, excluding a minor or mentally ill descendant, who, together with the surviving spouse of the deceased, is entitled to a benefit from an intestate estate renounces his right to receive such a benefit, such benefit shall vest in the surviving spouse.

If a person is disqualified from being an heir of the intestate estate of the deceased, or renounces his right to be such an heir, any benefit which he would have received if he had not been so disqualified or had not so renounced his right shall, subject to the provisions of subsection (6), devolve as if he had died immediately before the death of the deceased and, if applicable, as if he was not so disqualified.

== Capacity to inherit ==
The general rule is that all persons, born or unborn, natural or juristic, and regardless of their general legal capacity—minor children, too, therefore—may take validly any benefit conferred on them by will or on intestacy. There are, however, various factors that may influence a beneficiary's capacity to inherit. Persons who have limited legal capacity are still capable of inheriting. However, their ability to enjoy their inheritance as they see fit is affected.

=== Nasciturus fiction ===
A conceived but unborn foetus (the nasciturus) is not a legal subject, but the law takes into account the fact that, in the normal course of events, the foetus will one day become a legal subject. The nasciturus fiction states that, if an advantage accrues whilst a child, later born alive, is a foetus, he is deemed to have the requisite legal personality from the time that the benefit accrues.

The requirements for the nasciturus fiction are

- that the child have been conceived by the time the benefit accrues (the date of the death of the deceased);
- that the child subsequently be born alive; and
- that the fiction work to the advantage of the nasciturus.

Intestate succession and division of assets are postponed until there is certainty as to whether the foetus is born alive or not, to see whether the nasciturus fiction is applied.

Testate succession looks at the intention of the testator:

- If the testator's intention shows specific beneficiaries, the nasciturus fiction will not apply.
- If it shows members of a class of persons, the nasciturus fiction will apply.

The fiction will apply unless it has been specifically excluded from the will.

The fiction has gained statutory recognition in the Wills Act.

=== Adopted and extra-marital children ===
Adopted children are regarded, for all purposes, as the natural children of their adopted parents. The legal link between the child and his actual biological parents is severed, therefore.

Under the common law, extra-marital or illegitimate children were not qualified to inherit from their father's intestate estate, but could inherit from that of their mother. There is no longer any distinction between legitimate and extra-marital children; both are now in the same position.

=== Indignus ===
An indignus (which is to say, an unworthy heir) is precluded from inheriting because his conduct makes him unworthy, in a legal sense, to take a benefit from the deceased's estate. The basis for this ground of disqualification lies in the general principle that no-one may benefit from his own wrongdoing, or from conduct which the law regards as punishable. This principle is expressed by the maxim de bloedige hand neemt geen erf ‘the bloodied hand may not benefit’. Unworthiness is not a general principle; an individual can only be unworthy in respect of a particular person or that person's conjunctissimi (parent, spouse or child).

There are common-law and statutory grounds for disqualification that prevent beneficiaries from inheriting, and the courts have, over time, developed the law relating to these. Although the courts have recognised certain conduct as distasteful, the grounds of unworthiness are not limited. In consequence, and relying on prevailing values of public policy, new grounds of unworthiness may arise in the future. Instances where the courts have rendered a person unworthy to inherit are as follows:

Below are listed various categories of unworthy persons. It is not a closed list.

==== Fraud, duress and undue influence ====
A person may not inherit who, by fraud, duress or undue influence, has induced the testator to make a disposition in his or her favour. The amount of pressure which leads to the invalidity of a disposition on the ground of undue influence depends on various factors, such as the mental state of the testator and the relationship between the persons concerned.

==== Inducing immorality or degradation ====
A person who induces the deceased to lead an immoral or degrading lifestyle may not inherit either.

==== Unlawfully causing or contributing to the death of another ====
This can be either the intentional or negligent unlawful causing of death of another. At common law, somebody who has negligently caused the death of a deceased (of the testator's conjunctissimi) is also unworthy of inheriting from the deceased. It is evident, therefore, that unworthiness is not contingent on a criminal act.

Where, therefore, the deceased does not die immediately, and does not revoke a bequest conferred on the killer, the latter is still precluded from inheriting. It is an open question whether a person who has killed his spouse may claim the survivor's share in terms of the matrimonial property regime governing their marriage.

==== Justifiable homicide ====
A person is only disqualified if he caused the death of the deceased unlawfully and intentionally. If a person has successfully raised a defence of justifiable homicide, this is a full defence, and the accused is entitled to inherit from the deceased.

==== Perpetrator not criminally responsible ====
A person who is incapable of forming the necessary intention will not be regarded as being unworthy to inherit.

==== Forging, hiding or destroying a will ====
Forging, hiding or destroying a will is not only civil wrong (in that a person who does so will not be entitled to inherit); it is also a criminal wrong (in terms of section 102 of the Administration of Estates Act). A person is guilty of a crime, therefore, who steals, wilfully destroys, conceals, falsifies or damages a will, and may not inherit in terms of that will.

==== Pension benefits ====
A pension benefit is not considered to be an asset of a deceased estate. Pension benefits are dealt with outside the estate. The deceased may not bequeath these benefits to an heir or legatee. If pension benefits are due to the deceased, the trustees will decide to whom they are awarded. The bloedige hand principle has been extended to cover pension benefits.

==== Insurance benefits ====
When taking out an insurance policy, one must nominate a beneficiary. The bloedige hand principle has been extended to cover insurance benefits.

==== Persons involved in executing a will ====
Section 4A(1) of the Wills Act disqualifies four categories of people form receiving a benefit from a will:

- a person who signs the will as a witness;
- a person who signs the will as a proxy;
- a person who signs the will in the presence of and by the direction of the testator;
- a person who writes out the will or any part of it in his own handwriting; and
- the spouse of any of the above persons.

For the purposes of this provision, "any benefit" includes nomination as an executor, trustee or guardian. The rationale for such disqualifications is that they prevent fraud.

A beneficiary will not be disqualified, however, in the following circumstances:

- A court may declare a person or spouse competent to receive a benefit if it is satisfied that the testator was not defrauded or unduly influenced.
- If a person would have been entitled to receive a benefit in terms of intestate succession, he will not be disqualified, provided that the value of the benefit in terms of the will does not exceed what would have been received in terms of intestate succession.
- If a person who is entitled to receive a benefit in terms of the will has signed the will as a witness, along with two other competent witness who will not receive a benefit, that first person may inherit.

Section 4A does not apply where a beneficiary under a will witnesses a subsequent codicil made by the testator; similarly, a witness to a will may take a benefit under a subsequent codicil made by the testator.

==== Animals ====
Animals are not legal persons and, therefore, may not be beneficiaries in a will. When receiving a benefit, the heir must sign a receipt; obviously animals are unable to do so. Provision may be made for animals, however: trust funds to care for them, conditions that a person only inherits if they take care of the animal, etc.

=== Who inherits in the case of disqualification? ===
Where an heir who is a descendant of the testator, whether as a member of a class or otherwise, is disqualified from inheriting on any one of the grounds treated above, the benefit that he would have received devolves to his descendants per stirpes. This statutory rule is subject to there being no contrary intention in the will. It is implied that if the heir was NOT a descendant of the testator, then the benefit he/she would have received will NOT devolve upon his/her descendants per stirpes.

=== Customary law ===
Although the customary law of intestate succession has been abolished to a great extent by means of court judgments, there are customary law impediments influencing a beneficiary's capacity to inherit in terms of the customary law of succession. Cognisance must be taken of certain rules if a testator uses the principle of freedom of testation to stipulate in his or her will that the customary law of succession must apply.

== Administration of deceased estates ==
=== Security ===
Any person who has not been nominated as executor in a will, or who has not been exempted from providing security in terms of a will, must furnish security to the Master for the proper performance of their duties. Security is in the form of a bond of security, which is usually obtained from an insurance company against payment of a premium. If the executor later defaults and causes loss to the estate, the Master can enforce the security and recover the loss from the executor or the surety.

The amount of security is determined by the value of the assets in the estate. The cost of furnishing security is a liability against the estate, and is paid as an administration cost. The executor will not be required to furnish security

- where that person is the parent, spouse or child of the deceased; or
- where that person has been exempted from providing security in the deceased's will.

Despite the above, the Master will call for security

- where the executor's estate has been sequestrated;
- where the executor has committed an act of insolvency;
- where the executor resides outside South Africa; or
- for any other good reason which, in the opinion of the Master, necessitates security.

=== Advertising for creditors ===
In terms of section 29 of the Administration of Estates Act, as soon as letters of executorship have been granted, the executor must immediately advertise for creditors to submit claims against the estate within thirty days for publication.

The advertisements are required to be published on the same day in the Government Gazette, and in a newspaper that circulates in the district where the deceased was ordinarily resident at the time of death. If, at any time within twelve months prior to death, the deceased resided in any other district, the advertisement must also appear in a newspaper circulating in that district.

If a creditor does not lodge a claim in terms of the notice, the creditor runs the risk of having that claim excluded from the liquidation and distribution account. It has become customary to call upon debtors to pay their debts to the estate within the same period, even though this is not prescribed.

=== Advertising the liquidation and distribution account to lie for Inspection ===
In terms of section 35 of the Administration of Estates Act, once the account has been submitted to the Master, it is examined by one of the officials of the Master's Office to establish whether or not it is in order. If it is not found to be in order, the executor will be instructed to amend it to the satisfaction of the Master.

Once it has been approved by the Master, the executor advertises the account to lie for inspection. The advertisements are required to be published on the same date in the Government Gazette and a newspaper that circulates in the district where the deceased was ordinarily resident. If, at any time within twelve months prior to death, the deceased resided in any other district, the advertisement must also appear in a newspaper circulating in that district.

The advertisement must state the dates on which the account will lie for inspection, and the places at which it can be inspected. The account will lie for inspection at the relevant Master's Office, and at the offices of the Magistrate in the district where the deceased was ordinarily resident. If the deceased resided in more than one district during the twelve months prior to death, the account lies at that district's Magistrate as well.

The purpose of the account lying for inspection is to enable any interested party to object to the account if that party is of the opinion that it is incorrect. Any objections to the account must be submitted to the Master, who will then forward the objection to the executor for his comments, in terms of the audi alterem partem principle.

On receipt of the executor's comments, the Master makes a ruling. If the Master is of the opinion that the objection is well founded, the executor will be directed to amend the account. The Master may also refuse to sustain an objection.

Any person aggrieved by the Master's decision may approach the court within thirty days. The court may make any order it deems fit.

== Cases ==
=== Ex Parte Dittmarn ===
In Ex Parte Dittmarn NO and another (1919) OPD 103, sometimes called Ex Parte Dittmarn, the testator’s will provided that a farm should be sold by public auction. A sale was advertised, but the highest bid was not considered high enough to be a true reflection of its value. The farm was therefore withdrawn and sold out of hand for a price considerably higher than the bid. The court confirmed this sale to be valid, as sale by public auction would have resulted in serious loss.

==== Notes ====
- Ex Parte Dittmarn NO and another (1919) OPD 103
- "Executor" (1920) 37 South African Law Journal 222
- The Digest of South African Case Law. Consolidated Edition. 1926. Volume 1. p 13.
- The Law of South Africa. Second Edition. LexisNexis. 2003. Volume 31. para 391.
- David Meyerowitz. The Law and Practice of Administration of Estates. Fourth Edition. Juta & Co. 1966. pp 118 & 129.
- Erasmus and De Waal. The South African Law of Succession. Butterworths. 1989. para 214 at p 137.
- Ex Parte Coetzee (1949) 2 SA 533 (O) at 534

=== Ex Parte Douallier ===
In Ex parte De Douallier (1907) 24 SC 282, 17 CTR 147, 17 CTR 391, sometimes called Ex Parte Douallier certain premises had been bequeathed to the petitioner, and after her death to her eldest child, on the condition that she was not to mortgage or alienate the property. The petitioner was too poor to pay the costs of transfer or to repair the premises, which were fast becoming uninhabitable. The eldest child was a minor.

The court, in the interest of the minor, and in order to prevent the bequest from failing altogether, granted leave to mortgage the premises for such sum as would be sufficient to enable the petitioner to obtain transfer and place the premises in a habitable state of repair, and directed that the interest should be paid by her during her life.

==== Notes ====
- Ex parte De Douallier (1907) 24 SC 282, 17 CTR 147 and 391
- The Digest of South African Case Law. Consolidated Edition. Juta & Co. Cape Town and Johannesberg. 1927. Volume 3. pp 869 & 871.
- Scott and Scott. Wille's Law of Mortgage and Pledge in South Africa. Third Edition. Juta & Co. 1987. p 10.
- David Meyerowitz. The Law and Practice of Administration of Estates. Fourth Edition. Juta & Co. 1966. pp 310 & 320.
- Erasmus and De Waal. The South African Law of Succession. Butterworths. 1989. para 214 at p 137.

=== Ex Parte Sidelsky ===
In Ex Parte Sidelsky, the deceased made a provision in his will (executed in 1944) to pay his daughter £55 per month out of his deceased estate. In 1982, the daughter requested the court to increase this amount, as the Consumer Price Index (CPI) had increased by 825% between 1944 and 1982. The court held that the testator could not have envisaged such a large increase. Accordingly, the amount was increased to R1500 per month, and annual increases linked to the CPI were provided for.

==== Notes ====
- Ex parte Sidelsky 1983 (4) SA 598 (C).
- Erasmus and De Waal. The South African Law of Succession. Butterworths. 1989. p 137.
- The Law of South Africa. Butterworths. 1988. Volume 31. p 206.
- Tony Honoré. The South African Law of Trusts. Third Edition. Juta & Co. 1985. p 406.
- Levin v Levin 1984 (2) SA 298 at 304

=== Other cases ===
- Blom and Another v Brown and Others [2011] 3 All SA 223 (SCA).
- Ex Parte Boedel Steenkamp 1962 (3) SA 954 (O).
- Ex Parte Graham 1963 (4) SA 145.
- Ex Parte Meier en Andere 1980 (3) SA 154 (T).
- Gafin NO v Kavin 1980 (3) SA 1104 (W).
- Kidwell v The Master 1983 (1) SA 509 (E).
- Pillay and Others v Nagan and Others 2001 (1) SA 410 (D).
- Theron and Another v Master of the High Court [2001] 3 All SA 507 (NC).

== See also ==
- South African law
- South African law of persons
