= Legal history of wills =

History of a type of legal document

Wills have a lengthy history. The will, if not purely Roman in origin, at least owes to Roman law its complete development, a development which in most European countries was greatly aided at a later period by ecclesiastics versed in Roman law. In India, the will was unknown before English conquest. Eusebius and others have related of Noah's testament, made in writing, and witnessed under his seal, by which he disposed of the whole world. A more authentic instance of the early use of testaments occurs in the sacred writings, (Genesis 48) in which Jacob bequeaths to his son Joseph, a portion of his inheritance, double to that of his brethren.

== Ancient Greece ==
The Ancient Greek practice concerning wills was not the same in all places; some states permitted men to dispose of their estates, others wholly deprived them of that privilege. According to Plutarch, Solon "is much commended for his law concerning wills; for before his time no man was allowed to make any, but all the wealth of deceased persons belonged to their families; but he permitted them to bestow it on whom they pleased, esteeming friendship a stronger tie than kindred, and affection than necessity, and thus put every man's estate in the disposal of the possessor; yet he allowed not all sorts of wills, but required the following conditions in all persons that made them:

1. That they must be citizens of Athens, not slaves, or foreigners, for then their estates were confiscated for the public use.
2. That they must be men who have arrived to twenty years of age, for women and men under that age were not permitted to dispose by will of more than one medimn of barley.
3. That they must not be adopted; for when adopted persons died without issue, the estates they received by adoption returned to the relations of the men who adopted them.
4. That they should have no male children of their own, for then their estate belonged to these. If they had only daughters, the persons to whom the inheritance was bequeathed were obliged to marry them. Yet men were allowed to appoint heirs to succeed their children, in case these happened to die under twenty years of age.
5. That they should be in their right minds, because testaments extorted through the frenzy of a disease, or dotage of old age, were not in reality the wills of the persons that made them.
6. That they should not be under imprisonment, or other constraint, their consent being then only forced, nor in justice to be reputed voluntary.
7. That they should not be induced to it by the charms and insinuations of a wife; for (says Plutarch) the wise lawgiver with good reason thought that no difference was to be put between deceit and necessity, flattery and compulsion, since both are equally powerful to persuade a man from reason.

Wills were usually signed before several witnesses, who put seals to them for confirmation, then placed them in the hands of trustees, who were obliged to see them performed. At Athens, some of the magistrates were very often present at the making of wills. Sometimes the archons were also present. Sometimes the testator declared his will before sufficient witnesses, without committing it to writing. Thus Callias, fearing to be cut off by a wicked conspiracy, is said to have made an open declaration of his will before the popular assembly at Athens. There were several copies of wills in Diogenes Laërtius, as those of Aristotle, Lyco of Troas, and Theophrastus; whence it appears they had a common form, beginning with a wish for life and health."

== Ancient Rome ==
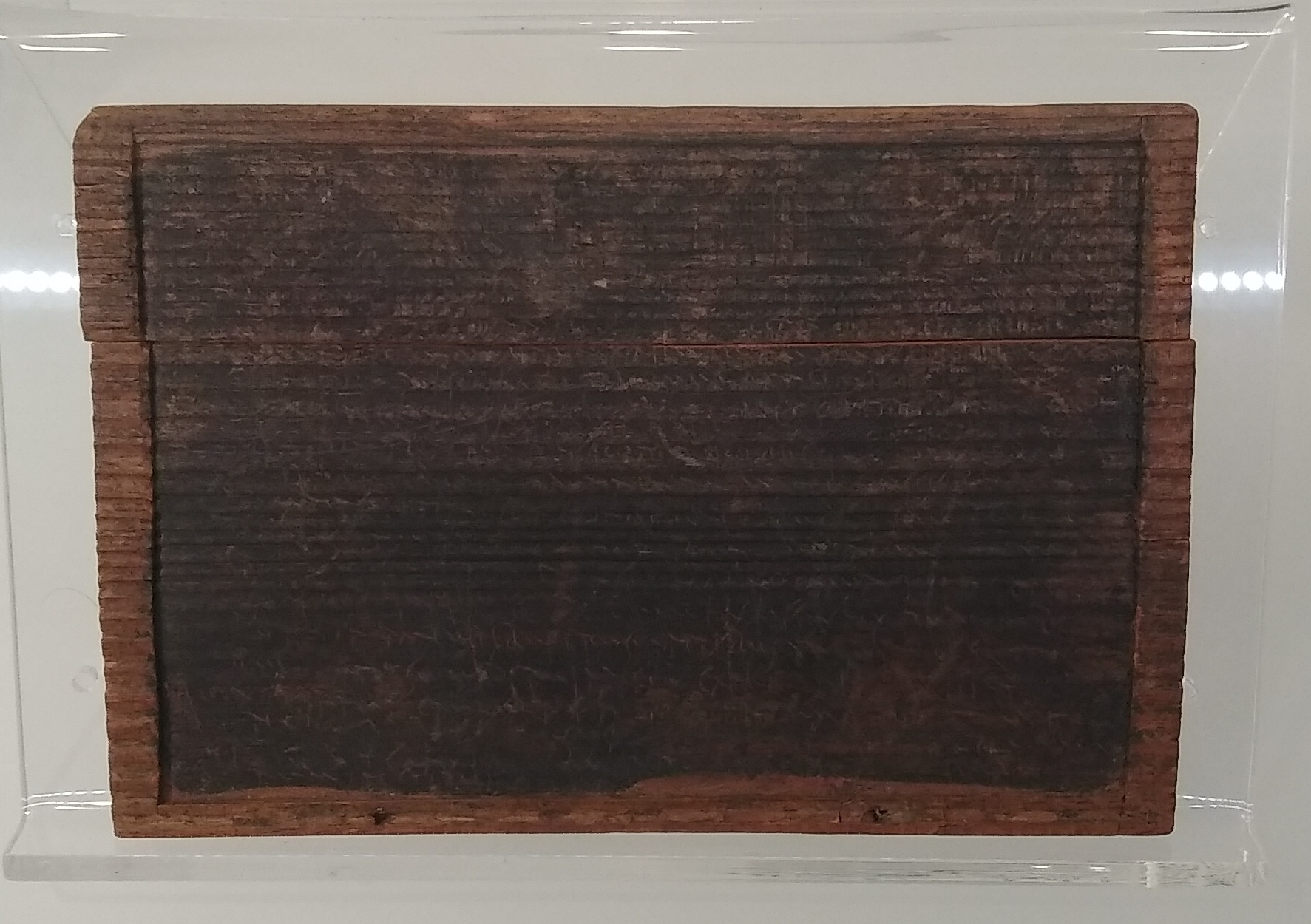
Wax tablet with part of a Roman will, found in Wales

The development of Roman law furthered the modern understanding of wills and serves as the foundation to the inheritance law of many European countries, greatly aided later by canon law.

The early Roman will differed from the modern will in important respects. It was effectual during the lifetime of the person who made it; it was made in public viva voce; all knew of the legator's intentions, the testator declaring his will in the presence of seven witnesses; and it could not be changed – these they called nuncupative wills; but the danger of trusting the will of the deceased to the memory of the living soon abolished these; and all wills were ordered to be in writing.

The objective, as in adoption, was to secure the perpetuation of the family. This was done by securing the due vesting of the breed in a person who could be relied upon to keep up the family rites. There is much probability in the conjecture that a will was only allowed to be made when the testator had no known gentile relatives, unless they had waived their rights. The Romans were wont to set aside wills, as being inofficiosa, deficient in natural duty, if they disinherited or totally passed by (without assigning a true and sufficient reason) any of the children of the testator.

It is certain from the text of Gaius that the earliest forms of will were those made in the comitia calata and those made in procinctu, or on the eve of battle. The former were published before the comitia, as representative of the patrician genies, and were originally a legislative act. These wills were the peculiar privilege of patricians. At a later time the form of plebeian will developed (irs/amentum per aes ci libram), and the law of testamentary succession was further modified by the influence of tile practor, especially in the direction of recognition of fideicommissa similar in some respects to testamentary trusts. Codicilli, or informal wills, also came into use and were sufficient for almost every purpose except for appointing an heir.

In the time of Justinian a will founded partly on the jus civile, partly on the edict of the praetor, partly on imperial constitutions and so called testamentum tripertitum, was generally in use. The main points essential to its validity were that the testator should possess testamentary capacity, and that the will should be signed or acknowledged by the testator in the presence of seven witnesses, or published orally in open court. The witnesses must be idonei, or free from legal disability. For instance, women and slaves were not good witnesses.

The whole property of the testator could not be alienated. The rights of heirs and descendants were protected by enactments which secured to them a legal minimum, the querela inofficiosi testamenti being the remedy of those passed over. The age at which testamentary capacity began was fourteen in the case of males, twelve in the case of females. Up to 439 A.D. a will must have been in Latin; after that date Greek was allowed.

Certain persons, especially soldiers, were privileged from observing the ordinary forms. The liability of the heir to the debts of the testator varied during different periods. At first it was practically unlimited. The law was then gradually modified in favour of the heir, until in the time of Justinian the heir who duly made an inventory of the property of the deceased was liable only for the assets to which he had succeeded. This limitation of liability is generally termed by the civilians beneficium inventarii.

Something like the English probate is to be found in the rules for breaking the seals of a will in presence of the praetor. Closely connected with the will was the donatio mortis causa, the rules of which have been as a whole adopted in England (see below). An immense space in the Corpus juris is occupied with testamentary law. The whole of part v. of the Digest (books xxviii.-xxxvi.) deals with the subject, and so do a large number of constitutions in the Code and Novels.

=== Influence of Christianity ===
In Christian tradition, Eusebius and others have related of Noah's testament, made in writing, and witnessed under his seal, by which he disposed of the whole world. Additionally, wills are spoken of in the Old Testament (in Genesis 48), where Jacob bequeaths to his son Joseph, a portion of his inheritance, double to that of his brethren.

The effect of Christianity upon the will was very marked. For instance, the duty of bequeathing to the Church was inculcated as early as Constantine, and heretics and monks were placed under a disability to make a will or take gifts left by will. A will was often deposited in a church. The Canon law follows the Roman law with a still greater leaning to the advantage of the Church. No Church property could be bequeathed. Manifest usurers were added to the list of those under disability. For the validity of a will it was generally necessary that it should be made in the presence of a priest and two witnesses, unless where it was made in pias causes. The witnesses, as in Roman law, must be done. Gifts to the Church were not subject to the deductions in favour of the heir and the children necessary in ordinary cases. In England, the Church succeeded in holding in its own hands for centuries jurisdiction in testamentary matters.

This is practically in accordance with the definition of Modestinus in Digest xxviu. I, 1, voluntatis nostrae justa sententia de eo quod quis post mortem suam fieri velit. Ancient Law, chap. vi. dii. ioi.

In the Leges barbarorum, where they are unaffected by Roman law, the will, if it existed at all, was of a very rudimentary character. The will is, on the other hand, recognized by Rabbinical and Islamic law.

=== Roman influence on English law ===
The Roman law of wills has had considerable effect upon English law. In the words of Sir Henry Maine, "The English law of testamentary succession to personalty has become a modified English form of the dispensation under which the inheritances of law. Roman citizens were administered." At the same time there are some broad and striking differences which should be borne in mind. The following among others (as of 1911) may be noticed:

1. A Roman testator could not, unless a soldier, die partly testate, and partly intestate. The will must stand or fall as a whole. This is not the case in England.
2. There is no one in English law to whom the universitas furis of the testator descends as it did to the Roman heirs, whose appointment was essential to the validity of a formal will, and who partook of the nature of the English heir, executor, administrator, devisee and legatee.
3. The disabilities of testators differed in the two systems. The disability of a slave or a heretic is peculiar to Roman law, of a youth between fourteen and twenty-one to English law.
4. The whole property may be disposed of in England; but it was not so at Rome, where, except by the wills of soldiers, children could not be disinherited unless for specified acts of misconduct. During the greater part of the period of Roman law the heir must also have had his Falcidian fourth in order to induce him to accept the inheritance.
5. In English law all wills must conform to certain statutory requirements; the Romans recognized from the time of Augustus an informal will called codicilli. The English codicil has little in common with this but the name. It is not an informal will, but an addition to a will, read as a part of it, and needing the same formalities of execution.
6. The Roman testatum applied to both movables and immovables; in England a legacy or bequest is a gift of personalty only, a gift of real estate being called a devise.
7. The Roman will spoke from the time of making; the English speaks from the time of death. This difference becomes very important in case of alteration in the position of the testator between the making of the will and his death. As a rule the Roman will could not, the English can, pass after-acquired property.

== Development of the law of wills in England ==
Liberty of alienation by will is found at an early period in England. To judge from the words of a law of Canute, intestacy appears to have been the exception at that time. How far the liberty extended is uncertain; it is the opinion of some authorities that complete disposition of land and goods was allowed, of others that limited rights of wife and children were recognized. However this may be, after the Conquest a distinction, the result of feudalism, arose between real and personal property. It will be convenient to treat the history of the two kinds of will separately.

=== Land ===
Wills Act 1542
- Act of Parliament
- Parliament of England
- Long title: An Act for the Explanation of the Statute of Wills.
- Citation: 34 & 35 Hen. 8. c. 5
- Territorial extent: England and Wales

Dates
- Royal assent: 12 May 1543
- Commencement: 3 November 1542 (Note: Start of session.)
- Repealed: 1 January 1838
Other legislation
Amends	Wills Act 1540
Repealed by	Wills Act 1837

Status: Repealed

Text of statute as originally enacted

It became the law after the Conquest, according to Sir Edward Coke, that an estate greater than for a term of years could not be disposed of by will, unless in Kent, where the custom of gavelkind prevailed, and in some manors and boroughs (especially the City of London), where the pre-Conquest law was preserved by special indulgence. The reason why devise of land was not acknowledged by law was, no doubt, partly to discourage deathbed gifts in mortmain, a view supported by Glanvill, partly because the testator could not give the devisee that seisin which was the principal element in a feudal conveyance. By means of the doctrine to uses, however, the devise of land was secured by a circuitous method, generally by conveyance to feoffees to uses in the lifetime of the feoffor to such uses as he should appoint by his will. Up to comparatively recent times a will of lands still bore traces of its origin in the conveyance to uses inter vivos. On the passing of the Statute of Uses (27 Hen. 8. c. 10) lands again became non-devisable, with a saving in the statute for the validity of wills made before 1 May 1536. The inconvenience of this state of things soon began to be felt, and was probably aggravated by the large amount of land thrown into the market after the dissolution of the monasteries. As a remedy the Statute of Wills (32 Hen. 8. c. 1) was passed in 1540, and a further explanatory act, the Wills Act 1542 (34 & 35 Hen. 8. c. 5).

Wills Act 1751
- Act of Parliament
- Parliament of Great Britain
- Long title: An Act for avoiding and putting an End to certain Doubts and Questions relating to the Attestation of Wills and Codicils concerning Real Estates, in that Part of Great Britain called England, and in His Majesty's Colonies and Plantations in America.
- Citation: 25 Geo. 2. c. 6
- Territorial extent: England and Wales; British America; (Note: Preamble. Section 10.)

Dates
- Royal assent: 26 March 1752
- Commencement: 24 June 1752 (Note: Section 1.)
- Repealed: 1 January 1838
Other legislation
Repealed by	Wills Act 1837
Relates to	Statute of Frauds; Disposition of Copyhold Estates by Will Act 1815

Status: Repealed

Text of statute as originally enacted

Disposition of Copyhold Estates by Will Act 1815
- Act of Parliament
- Parliament of the United Kingdom
- Long title: An Act to remove certain Difficulties in the Disposition of Copyhold Estates by Will.
- Citation: 55 Geo. 3. c. 192
- Territorial extent: England and Wales; Ireland

Dates
- Royal assent: 12 July 1815
- Commencement: 12 July 1815 (Note: The Acts of Parliament (Commencement) Act 1793.)
- Repealed: 1 January 1838
Other legislation
Repealed by	Wills Act 1837
Relates to	Wills Act 1751

Status: Repealed

Text of statute as originally enacted

The effect of these acts was to make lands held in fee simple devisable by will in writing, to the extent of two-thirds where the tenure was by knight service, and the whole where it was in socage. Corporations were incapacitated to receive, and married women, infants, idiots and lunatics to devise. The Tenures Abolition Act 1660 (12 Cha. 2. c. 24), by abolishing tenure by knight service, made all lands devisable, in the same vein the Statute of Frauds (29 Cha. 2. c. 3) (1677) dealt with the formalities of execution. Up to this time simple notes, even in the handwriting of another person, constituted a sufficient will, if published by the testator as such. The Statute of Frauds required, among other things, that all devises should be in writing, signed by the testator or by some person for him in his presence and by his direction, and should also be subscribed by three or four credible witnesses. The strict interpretation by the courts of the credibility of witnesses led to the passing of the Wills Act 1751 (25 Geo. 2. c. 6), making interested witnesses sufficient for the due execution of the will, but declaring gifts to them void. The will of a man was revoked by marriage and the birth of a child, of a woman by marriage only. A will was also revoked by an alteration in circumstances, and even by a void conveyance inter vivos of land devised by the will made subsequently to the date of the will, which was presumed to be an attempt by the grantor to give legal effect to a change of intention. As in Roman law, a will spoke from the time of the making, so that it could not avail to pass after-acquired property without republication, which was equivalent to making a new will. Copyholds were not devisable before 1815, but were usually surrendered to the use of the will of the copyhold tenant; the Disposition of Copyhold Estates by Will Act 1815 (55 Geo. 3. c. 192) made them devisable simply. Devises of lands have gradually been made liable to the claims of creditors by a series of statutes beginning with the year 1691.

=== Personal property ===
Wills Act 1692
- Act of Parliament
- Parliament of England
- Long title: An Act for that the Inhabitants of the Province of York may dispose of their personal Estates by their Wills notwithstanding the Custom of that province.
- Citation: 4 Will. & Mar. c. 2
- Territorial extent: England and Wales

Dates
- Royal assent: 20 January 1693
- Commencement: 26 March 1693
- Repealed: 15 July 1867
Other legislation
Amended by	Wills Act 1703
Repealed by	Statute Law Revision Act 1867
Relates to	Wills Act 1695

Status: Repealed

Text of statute as originally enacted

Wills Act 1695
- Act of Parliament
- Parliament of England
- Long title: An Act to take away the Custome of Wales which hinders persons from disposeing their Personal Estates by their Wills.
- Citation: 7 & 8 Will. 3. c. 38
- Territorial extent: England and Wales

Dates
- Royal assent: 27 April 1696
- Commencement: 24 June 1696
- Repealed: 15 July 1867
Other legislation
Repealed by	Statute Law Revision Act 1867

Status: Repealed

Text of statute as originally enacted

Wills Act 1703
- Act of Parliament
- Parliament of England
- Long title: An Act to repeal a Proviso in an Act of the Fourth Year of the Reign of King William and Queen Mary, which prevents the Citizens of the City of York from disposing of their Personal Estates by their Wills, as others inhabiting within the Province of York, by that Act, may do.
- Citation: 2 & 3 Ann. c. 5
- Territorial extent: England and Wales

Dates
- Royal assent: 24 February 1704
- Commencement: 26 March 1704
- Repealed: 15 July 1867
Other legislation
Amends	Wills Act 1692
Repealed by	Statute Law Revision Act 1867

Status: Repealed

Text of statute as originally enacted

The history of wills of personalty was considerably different, but to some extent followed parallel lines. In both cases partial preceded complete power of disposition. The general opinion of the best authorities is that by the common law of England a man could only dispose of his whole personal property if he left no wife or children; if he left either wife or children he could only dispose of one-half, and one-third if he left both wife and children. The shares of wife and children were called their pars rationabilis. This pars rationabilis is expressly recognized in Magna Carta and was sued for by the writ de rationabili parte. At what period the right of disposition of the whole personalty superseded the old law is uncertain. That it did so is certain, and the places where the old rule still existed—the province of York, Wales and the City of London—were regarded as exceptions. The right of bequest in these places was not assimilated to the general law until, for York, the passing of the Wills Act 1692 (4 Will. & Mar. c. 2) for the province of York (other than the City of York) and the Wills Act 1703 (2 & 3 Ann. c. 5), for the City of York; for Wales by the Wills Act 1695 (7 & 8 Will. 3. c. 38) with the final assimilation not taking place until 1 June 1725 when the City of London Elections Act 1724 (11 Geo. 1. c. 18) abolished pars rationabilis for unmarried freemen of the City of London. A will of personalty could be made by a male at fourteen, by a female at twelve. The formalities in the case of wills of personalty were not as numerous as in the case of wills of land. Up to 1838 a nuncupative or oral will was sufficient, subject, where the gift was of £30 or more, to the restrictions contained in the Statute of Frauds. The witnesses to a written will need not be "credible," and it was specially enacted by Administration of Justice Act 1705 (4 & 5 Ann. c. 3) that any one who could give evidence in a court of law was a good witness to a will of personalty. A will entirely in the testator's handwriting, called a holographic will, was valid without signature. At one time the executor was entitled to the residue in default of a residuary legatee, but the Executors Act 1830 (11 Geo. 4 & 1 Will. 4. c. 40) made him in such an event trustee for the next of kin.

Jurisdiction over wills of personalty was until 1858 in the ecclesiastical courts, probate being granted by the diocesan court if the goods of the deceased lay in the same diocese, in the provincial court of Canterbury (the prerogative court) or York (the chancery court) if the deceased had bona notabilia, that is, goods to the value of £5 in two dioceses. The ecclesiastical jurisdiction was of a very ancient origin. It was fully established under Henry II, as it is mentioned by Glanvill. In the city of London wills were enrolled in the Court of Hustings from 1258 to 1688 after having been proved before the ordinary. Contested cases before 1858 were tried in the provincial court with an appeal originally to the Court of Delegates, later to the Judicial Committee of the Privy Council. There were also a few special local jurisdictions, courts baron, the university courts, and others, probably for the most part survivals of the pre-Conquest period, when wills seem to have been published in the county court. The ecclesiastical courts had no jurisdiction over wills of land, and the common law courts were careful to keep the ecclesiastical courts within their limits by means of prohibition. No probate of a will of land was necessary, and title to real estate by will might be made by production of the will as a document of title. The liability of the executor and legatee for the debts of the testator has been gradually established by legislation. In general it is limited to the amount of the succession. Personal liability of the executor beyond this can by the Statute of Frauds only be established by contract in writing.

=== Legislation ===
Such were the principal stages in the history of the law as it affected wills made before 1838 or proved before 1858. The principal acts in force in the early twentieth century were the Wills Act 1837 (7 Will. 4 & 1 Vict. c. 26), the Wills Act Amendment Act 1852 (15 & 16 Vict. c 24), the Court of Probate Act 1857 (20 & 21 Vict. c. 77), the Supreme Court of Judicature Act 1873 (36 & 37 Vict. c. 66) the Supreme Court of Judicature Act 1875 (38 & 39 Vict. c. 77), and the Land Transfer Act 1897 (60 & 61 Vict. c. 65). All but the acts of 1837 and 1852 deal mainly with what happens to the will after death, whether under the voluntary or contentious jurisdiction of the Probate Division.

Widow's Bequest of Corn on Her Land Act 1235
- Act of Parliament
- Parliament of England
- Long title: Widows may bequeath the crop of their land.
- Citation: 20 Hen. 3. c. 2
- Territorial extent: England and Wales; Ireland

Dates
- Royal assent: 1235
- Commencement: 1235
- Repealed: 30 July 1948
Other legislation
Repealed by	Statute Law Revision Act 1948
Relates to	Statute of Merton

Status: Repealed

Text of statute as originally enacted

The earliest on the statute roll is an act of Henry III, the Widow's Bequest of Corn on Her Land Act 1235 (20 Hen. 3. c. 2), enabling a widow to bequeath the crops of her lands. Before the Wills Act 1837 uniformity in the law had been urgently recommended by the Real Property Commissioners in 1833. It appears from their report that at the time of its appearance there were ten different ways in which a will might be made under different circumstances.

The Wills Act 1837 affected both the making and the interpretation of wills. Excluding the latter for the present, its main provisions were these:

- All property, real and personal, and of whatever tenure, may be disposed of by will.
- If customary freeholds or copyholds be devised, the will must be entered on the manorial rolls.
- No will made by any person under the age of twenty-one is valid.
- Every will is to be in writing, signed at the foot or end thereof by the testator or by some person in his presence and by his direction, and such signature is to be made or acknowledged by the testator in the presence of two or more witnesses present at the same time, who are to subscribe the will in the presence of the testator. It is usual for the testator and the witnesses to sign every sheet.
- Gifts to a witness or the husband or wife of a witness are void.
- A will is revoked by a later will, or by destruction with the intention of revoking, but not by presumption arising from an alteration in circumstances.
- Alterations in a will must be executed and attested as a will.
- A will speaks from the death of the testator, unless a contrary intention appear.
- An unattested document may be, if properly identified, incorporated in a will.

Rules of interpretation or construction depend chiefly on decisions of the courts, to a smaller extent on statutory enactment. The law was gradually brought into its present condition through precedents extending back for centuries, especially decisions of the court of chancery, the court par excellence of construction, as distinguished from the court of probate. The court of probate did not deal unless incidentally with the meaning of the will; its jurisdiction was confined to seeing that it was duly executed. The present state of the law of interpretation is highly technical. Some phrases have obtained a conventional meaning which the testators who used them probably did not dream of. Many of the judicial doctrines which had gradually become established were altered by the Wills Act 1837.

Rules of interpretation founded on principles of equity independent of statute are very numerous. Some of the more important, stated in as general a form as possible, are these:

- The intention of the testator is to be observed. This rule is called by Sir Edward Coke the pole star to guide the judges.
- There is a presumption against intestacy, against double portions, against constructing merely precatory words to import a trust, etc.
- One part of the will is to be expounded by another.
- Interlineations and alterations are presumed to have been made after, not as in deeds before, execution.
- Words are supposed to be used in their strict and primary sense. Many words and phrases, however, such as "money," "residue," and "issue" and other words of relationship, have become invested with a technical meaning, but there has been a recent tendency to include illegitimate children in a gift to "children."
- Evidence is admissible in certain cases to explain latent ambiguity, and parol evidence of the terms of a lost will may be given as in the famous case of Sugden v. Lord St Leonards (1876), 1 Prob. Div. 154, relating to the lost will of Edward Sugden, 1st Baron St Leonards.

A will may be void, in whole or in part, for many reasons, which may be divided into two great classes, those arising from external circumstances and those arising from the will itself. The main examples of the former class are revocation by burning, tearing, etc., by a later will, or by marriage of the testator (except as below), incapacity of the testator from insanity, infancy or legal disability (such as being a convict), undue influence and fraud, any one of which is ground for the court to refuse or revoke probate of a will. A will being ambulatory is always revocable, unless in one or two exceptional instances. Undue influence is a ground upon which frequent attempts are made to set aside wills. Its nature is well explained in a judgment of Lord Penzance's: "Pressure of whatever character, whether acting on the fears or the hopes, if so exerted as to overpower the volition without convincing the judgment, is a species of restraint under which no valid will can be made." There is nothing corresponding to the querela inofficiosi testamenti, but unnatural provisions may be evidence of mental defect.

The circumstances appearing on the face of the will which make it open to objection may either avoid it altogether or create a partial intestacy, the will remaining good as a whole. Where the will is not duly executed, e.g. if it is a forgery or if it is not signed by the testator or the proper number of witnesses, the will is not admitted to probate at all. Where it contains devises or bequests bad in law, as in general restraint of marriage, or tending to create perpetuities, or contrary to public policy, or to some particular enactment, only the illegal part is void. A remarkable instance is a well-known case in which a condition subsequent in a devise was held void as against public policy, being a gift over of the estate devised in case the first devisee, the eldest son of an earl, did not before his death obtain the lapsed title of Duke of Bridgewater.

At common law there could be no larceny of a will of lands. But by the Larceny Act 1861 (24 & 25 Vict. c. 96) stealing, injuring or concealing a will, whether of real or personal estate, was punishable with penal servitude for life. Forgery of a will (at one time a capital crime) rendered the offender liable to the same penalty. Fraudulent concealment of a will material to the title by a vendor or mortgagor of land or chattels is, by the Law of Property Amendment Act 1859 (22 & 23 Vict. c. 35), a misdemeanour punishable by fine or imprisonment or both.

== History of wills in other jurisdictions ==
=== United States ===
In the 21st century, eighteen is the typical age of testamentary capacity. Full liberty of disposition is not universal. In particular, many states normally grant spouses the right to at least half the estate regardless of what the will says (or if no will can be found). Some require that children cannot be disinherited without good cause. In many case, children omitted in a will may still take their share. Louisiana followed French law, by which the testator can under no circumstances alienate by will more than half his property if he leave issue or ascendants. In 1911, the husband's consent was sometimes required for a married woman's will to be valid, but this is no longer the case. Nuncupative and holographic wills are valid in some states, but are forbidden in others. The former are confined to personality and must generally be reduced to writing within a short time after the words are spoken. In Louisiana the mystic or sealed will still existed in 1911. The number of witnesses necessary for the validity of a will of any kind is usually two. Vermont, the last state to require three witnesses, changed its law in 2006. To be valid, witnesses must not be heirs under the will. In 1911, wills of soldiers and sailors were privileged, as in England.

In modern U.S. law, wills are not required to be registered prior to death in most states, but are registered and put in the public record after the person making the will dies and the estate is probated. However, it is often still a good idea to have the signing and witnessing of a will notarized, to reduce the risk of disputes over the will's validity after death. Wills can be used to nominate guardians for minor children, but because children are not property, the will cannot have the final word on the question. Guardianship is decided by courts, though the usual outcome is that guardianship is awarded to the other surviving parent, or, if no parents survive, to the guardian nominated in the last surviving parent's will.

=== Scotland (in 1911) ===
Up to 1868, wills of immovables were not allowed under Scots law. The usual means of obtaining disposition of heritage after death was a trust disposition and settlement by deed de praesenti, under which the truster disposed the property to trustees according to the trusts of the settlement, reserving a life interest. Thus something very similar to a testamentary disposition was secured by means resembling those employed in England before the Wills Act 1540 (32 Hen. 8. c. 1) of Henry VIII. The main disadvantage of the trust disposition was that it was liable to be overthrown by the heir, who could reduce ex capite lecti all voluntary deeds made to his prejudice within sixty days of the death of his ancestor. The Titles to Land Consolidation (Scotland) Act 1868 (31 & 32 Vict. c. 101) made it competent to any owner of lands to settle the succession to the same in the event of death by testamentary or mortis causa deeds or writings. In 1871 reduction ex capite lecti was abolished by the Reductions Ex Capite Lecti Abolished Act 1871 (34 & 35 Vict. c. 81). A will of immovables must be executed with the formalities of a deed and registered to give title. The disability of a woman as a witness was removed by the Titles to Land Consolidation (Scotland) Act 1868. As to wills of movables, there arc several important points in which they differ from corresponding wills in England, the influence of Roman law being more marked. Males may make a will at fourteen, females at twelve. A nuncupative legacy is good to the amount of £100 Scots (£8, 6s. 8d.), and a holograph testament is good without witnesses, but it must be signed by the testator, differing in this from the old English holograph. By the Conveyancing (Scotland) Act 1874 (37 & 38 Vict. c. 94) such a will is presumed to have been executed on the date which it bears. Not all movables can be left, as in England. The movable property of the deceased is subject to jus relictae and legitime. See McLaren, Wills and Succession, for the law, and Judicial Styles for styles.

=== France (as of 1911) ===
The law is mainly contained in art. 967–1074 of the French Civil Code. Wills in France may be of three kinds:

1. holograph, which must be wholly written, dated and signed by the testator;
2. notarially executed, i.e. drawn up by two notaries and signed in presence of two witnesses or by one notary before four witnesses; this form of will must be dictated by the testator and drafted by the notary, must be read over to the testator in the presence of the witnesses, and must be signed by testator and witnesses;
3. mystic, which are signed by the testator, then closed and sealed and delivered by him to a notary before six witnesses; the notary then draws up an account of the proceedings on the instrument which is signed by the testator, notary and witnesses.

Beneficiaries and their blood relations to the fourth degree may not be witnesses. Nuncupative wills are not recognized. Soldiers' and sailors' wills are subject to special rules as in most other countries. Full freedom of testation only exists when the testator has no ascendants or descendants, otherwise the disposable portion of his estate is constrained by the rules of forced heirship: if the testator has one child he may only dispose of half his estate, if two only one-third, if three or more only one-fourth; if he has no descendants but ascendants in both lines he may dispose of half, if ascendants in one line only he may dispose of three-fourths. The full age of testamentary capacity is 21 years, but minors over the age of 16 may dispose by will of half of the estate of which they could dispose had they been of full age. There is no restriction against married women making wills. Will substitutes such as will contracts or a pactum successorium (a.k.a. contract concerning succession) are invalid (art. 791 FrCC).

The civil codes of southern continental Europe are in general accordance with French law.

=== Germany (in 1911) ===
Most of the law will be found in the German Civil Code, ss. 2064–2273. A holograph will, either single or joint, is allowed. Other wills must be notarially executed, declared before a judge, or (if outside Germany) a consul. Two witnesses are required, unless the witness is a notary or a clerk of court (court registrar), any of whom will suffice. The formalities may be relaxed in certain cases, such as imminent death, a state of siege, a prevailing epidemic, etc. Freedom of testation is constrained by the rules of forced heirship: descendants, ascendants, and the spouse are all entitled to forced shares (a.k.a. legal right shares). Forced heirs may only be disinherited for certain specified kinds of misconduct. Will contracts are invalid; however, a pactum successorium (a.k.a. contract concerning succession) made inter vivos is valid in certain cases and will operate on the death of the deceased. The two main types of pacta successoria are the contractual disclaimer of interest (Erbverzichtvertrag) and deed of variation (Erbauskaufvertrag). Revoking a will works much the same as in England, except with respect to marriage. One particular form of revocation in Germany occurs when a will is found to be inconsistent with a pactum successorium; in such an event the will is wholly or pro tanto revoked.

=== International law ===
There are three main directions which the opinion of jurists and the practice of courts have taken, as of 1911:

1. The whole property of the testator may be subjected to the law of his domicile. To this effect is the opinion of Savigny and the German practice. Certain modifications have been made by modern law, especially by the Einführungsgesetz of 1896.
2. The property may be subjected to the law of the place where it happens to be at the time of the testator's death.
3. The movable property may be subjected to the law of the domicile. The immovable (including leaseholds) to the law of the place where it is situated, the lex loci rei sitae. England and the United States follow this rule.

Wills Act 1861 (Note: The citation of this act by this short title was authorised by section 1 of, and the first schedule to, the Short Titles Act 1896. Due to the repeal of those provisions it is now authorised by section 19(2) of the Interpretation Act 1978.)
- Act of Parliament
- Parliament of the United Kingdom
- Long title: An Act to amend the Law with respect to Wills of Personal Estate made by British Subjects.
- Citation: 24 & 25 Vict. c. 114
- Territorial extent: United Kingdom

Dates
- Royal assent: 6 August 1861
- Commencement: 6 August 1861
- Repealed: 1 January 1964
Other legislation
Repealed by	Wills Act 1963
Relates to	Wills Act 1837; Domicile Act 1861

Status: Repealed

Text of statute as originally enacted

Domicile Act 1861
- Act of Parliament
- Parliament of the United Kingdom
- Long title: An Act to amend the Law in relation to the Wills and Domicile of British Subjects dying whilst resident abroad, and of Foreign Subjects dying whilst resident within Her Majesty’s Dominions.
- Citation: 24 & 25 Vict. c. 121
- Territorial extent: United Kingdom

Dates
- Royal assent: 6 August 1861
- Commencement: 6 August 1861
Other legislation
Amended by	Statute Law (Repeals) Act 1971
Relates to	Wills Act 1837; Wills Act 1861

Status: Partially repealed

Text of statute as originally enacted

Revised text of statute as amended

Text of the Domicile Act 1861 as in force today (including any amendments) within the United Kingdom, from legislation.gov.uk.

Testamentary capacity is generally governed by the law of the testator's domicile at the time of his death, the form of the instrument in most countries either by the law of his domicile or the law of the place where the will was made, at his option. The old rule of English law was to allow the former alternative only. The law was altered for the United Kingdom in 1861 by the Wills Act 1861 (24 & 25 Vict. c. 114) (also known as Lord Kingsdown's Act), by which a will made out of the United Kingdom by a British subject is, as far as regards personal estate, good if made according to the forms required by the law of the place where it was made, or by the law of the testator's domicile at the time of making it, or by the law of the place of his domicile of origin. Subsequent change of domicile does not avoid such a will. Another act passed on the same day, the Domicile Act 1861 (24 & 25 Vict. c. 121), enacted that by convention with any foreign government foreign domicile with regard to wills could not be acquired by a testator without a year's residence and a written declaration of intention to become domiciled. By the same act foreign consuls may by convention have certain authority over the wills and property of subjects of foreign states dying in England.

In the United States some states have adopted the narrow policy of enacting by statute the old common law rule, and providing that no will is valid unless made in the form required by the law of the state of the testator's domicile. The capacity of the testator, revocation and construction of a will, are governed by the law of the domicile of the testator at the time of his death—except in cases affected by Lord Kingsdown's Act, as he must be supposed to have used language in consonance with that law, unless indeed he express himself in technical language of another country. A good instance is Groos' Case (1904), Prob. 269, where it was held that the will of a Dutch woman (at the time of her death domiciled in England) duly made in Holland was not revoked by her marriage, that being no ground of revocation by the law of Holland.

The persons who are to take under a will are decided by different rules according as the property is movable or immovable, the former being governed by the law of the domicile, the latter by the lex loci rei sitae. It was held, however, in 1881 by the court of appeal in England that, under the will of an Englishman domiciled in Holland, leaving personal property to children, children legitimated per subsequens matrimonium could take, as they were legitimate by the law of Holland, though not by the law of England (re Goodman's Trusts, 17 Ch. D. 266). This principle was carried further in re Grey's Trusts (1892), 3 Ch. 88, where it was held that a legitimated child was entitled to share in a devise of English realty. But a person born out of lawful wedlock, though legitimated, could not succeed as heir to real estate in England as of 1911 (Birtwhistle v. Vardill, 2 Cl. and F. 895). A will duly executed abroad is generally required to be clothed with the authority of a court of the country where any property affected by the will is situate.
