= Wills Act =

Stock short title used for legislation

Wills Act is a stock short title used in Australia, Malaysia, New Zealand, South Africa, and the United Kingdom for legislation relating to wills.

== List ==
=== Australia ===
- Wills, Probate and Administration Act 1898
- Wills Act 1997 (Vic)
- Wills Act 1936 (SA)
- Wills Act 2008 (Tas)

=== Malaysia ===
- Wills Act 1959

=== New Zealand ===
- Wills Act 2007]

=== South Africa ===
- Wills Act 7 of 1953

=== United Kingdom ===
- Statute of Wills 1540 (32 Hen. 8. c. 1)
- Statute of Wills 1542 (34 & 35 Hen. 8. c. 5)
- Wills Act 1751 (25 Geo. 2. c. 6)
- Wills Act 1837 (7 Will. 4 & 1 Vict. c. 26)
- Wills Act Amendment Act 1852 (15 & 16 Vict. c. 24)
- Wills Act 1861 or Lord Kingsdown's Act (24 & 25 Vict. c. 114)
- Wills (Soldiers and Sailors) Act 1918 (8 & 9 Geo. 5. c. 58)
- Wills Act 1963 (c. 44)
- Wills Act 1968 (c. 28)

== See also ==
- List of short titles
