= Joint wills and mutual wills =

Joint wills and mutual wills are closely related terms used in the law of wills to describe two types of testamentary writing that may be executed by a married couple to ensure that their property is disposed of identically. Neither should be confused with mirror wills which means two separate, identical wills, which may or may not also be mutual wills.

== Joint wills ==
A joint will is a single document executed by more than one person (typically between spouses), making which has effect in relation to each signatory's property upon death (unless the will is revoked (cancels) the will during the signatory's lifetime). Although a single document, the joint will is a separate distribution of property by each executor (signatory) and will be treated as such on admission to probate. Mutual wills are any two (or more) wills which are mutually binding, such that following the first death the survivor is constrained in the ability to dispose of the property by the agreement the survivor made with the deceased. Historically such wills had an important role in ensuring property passed to children of a marriage rather than a spouse of a widow or widower on a remarriage.

The recognition of these forms varies widely from one jurisdiction to the next. Some permit both, some will not recognize joint wills, and many have established a presumption that one or both of these forms creates a will contract.

A joint will differs substantively from a mutual will in that the former is not intended to be irrevocable or to express a mutual intention; it is merely an administrative convenience. A will may be both joint (on one document) and mutual (see below).

== Mutual wills ==
Mutual wills have four basic requirements and a strict standard for enforceability:

1. The agreement must be made in a particular form.
2. The agreement must be contractual in effect. (Contrast Goodchild v Goodchild [1997] 1 WLR 1216. and Lewis v Cotton [2001] 2 NZLR)
3. The agreement must be intended to be irrevocable.
4. The surviving party must have intended the will to reflect the agreement.

Mutual wills are rare, and often another form of constructive trust is imposed (See Healey v Browne [2002] 2 WTLR 849). It is also noted (see Carnwath J in Re Goodchild ibid) that a mutual will is a technical legal device requiring an intention to form a binding agreement and that this often differs from the "loose moral obligation" presupposed as binding by the layman.

== Common law authority ==
The major common law authority in this area is Re Oldham [1925] Ch. 75. This discussed the 18th-century case of Dufour v Pereira which first evinced the doctrine, in which Lord Camden remarked "he, that dies first, does by his death carry the agreement on his part into execution". Astbury J in Oldham distinguished mutual wills from mirror wills - that they are made in identical terms "does not go nearly far enough". There must be "an arrangement proved to the satisfaction of the court" and this must be a binding, irrevocable agreement.

In Re Cleaver [1981] 1 WLR Nourse J took a less strict approach in finding that identical wills went towards proving the existence of an agreement, however, this approach was rejected in Re Goodchild [1996] 1 WLR where Carnwath J stated the importance of having specific evidence as to the testator's mutual intentions at the time of execution of the wills. Carnwath J approved the "floating trust" analogy, first proposed by Dixon J in Birmingham v Renfrew [1937] CLR, which holds that the law will give effect to the intention (to create a mutually binding will) by imposing a floating trust which becomes irrevocable after the death of the first testator and crystallises after the death of the survivor.

In the Court of Appeal decision in Goodchild Legatt LJ approved the dicta of Carnwath J and added that "for the doctrine to apply there must be a contract". This approach raises problems as will be seen below. However, the contractual requirement has been rejected in other decisions or at least diluted. Dixon J in Birmingham, commenting on Dufour v Pereira, noted that it is the trust arising from the course of conduct which is enforced, not the contract itself. This approach has received further credence in the decision of Blanchard J in Lewis v Cotton. "A formal legal contract is not needed. A contract made without formality is enough...The crucial factor must be that the terms of the mutual engagement... are sufficiently certain that the Court can see its way to enforce them." The importance of this approach is, as Blanchard J notes, that the focus is on the obligation not to deal with property contrary to the agreement rather than on non-revocation. This, therefore, covers situations such as that in Healey v Browne where there has been an inter vivos transfer to avoid the will.

In Healey v Browne a husband transferred assets jointly to himself and his son after the death of his wife. Although there was found to be no mutual will (Donaldson QC adopted the contractual requirement), he considered that where there was a valid mutual will the second testator is free to use the assets for his own beneficial interest as long as it is not calculated to defeat the agreement: "Where the fiduciary duty is breached by such a voluntary disposition inter vivos of the property in question, the "crystallisation" of the floating obligation must occur at the moment of that disposition." (Note that Donaldson QC imposed a secret trust in the circumstances which reduced the son's interest to 50%, that being the interest held by the husband)

In Olins v Walters [2009] 2 WLR 1 C.A. the Court of Appeal has held that although it is a necessary condition for mutual wills that there is clear and satisfactory evidence of a contract between the testators, it is a legally sufficient condition that the contract provides, in return for one testator agreeing to make a will in a particular form and not to revoke it without notice to the other testator, the latter would also make a will in a particular form and agree not to revoke it without notice to the first testator. Once a contract of that kind is established, equity will impose on the surviving testator a constructive trust not to dispose of the property in any other way. There did not have to be more detailed terms of the contract because the remedy was not founded on specific performance of contractual obligations but upon implementation of the trust, and the intentions of the parties had only to be expressed sufficiently to lay the foundations for that equitable obligation. The case also held that, where established, the equitable obligation under the trust became immediately binding upon the surviving testator upon the death of the first and was not postponed to take effect only after the death of the second or last testator when the property, or what was left of it, came into the hands of his personal representatives.

== Revocability ==
Another issue as regards mutual wills is the question of revocability. In Re Hobley Charles Aldous QC held that there could be either unilateral or mutual revocation provided it occurred during the lifetime of both testators. However, the problem with this approach is that unilateral revocation is against the general principle of contract. Several explanations for this could be proffered. Firstly, there could be an implicit term that the agreement is revocable. Secondly, it could be conceptually viewed that the agreement takes on the revocable nature of the will to which it relates. Thirdly, as the doctrine is based on detrimental reliance, the agreement only concretized the death of the other party. Fourthly, one could apply the unconscionability rationale that unjust enrichment could only be complete when one party takes a benefit under the will of the other party.

Re Hobley adopts the unconscionability rationale such that the imposition of a constructive trust is only justified by unconscionability, therefore there must be detrimental reliance. This would appear to be analogous to the doctrine of estoppel. Another consequence of this approach is that the trust must come into existence before the death of the first testator as otherwise the subject matter of the trust would be uncertain and could possibly be avoided by inter vivos dispositions.

Another point of controversy was whether or not the second testator had to benefit from the initial disposition. Commentators had argued that this was the case as if the second testator did not benefit the unjust enrichment argument would be untenable. However, Re Dale [1994] Ch held that no benefit was necessary. Morritt J reasoned that although the aim of the doctrine was to prevent fraud on the first testator this did not require a corresponding benefit for the second testator. Friel (1996 1 CPLJ) argued against this saying that the trust should not be imposed on the property but rather on the implementation of the contract between the parties. An excellent rebuke to this approach and support for the view in Re Dale is to be found in the judgment of Rowles JA in the Court of Appeal (British Columbia) decision in University of Manitoba v Sanderson [1998]. Rowles contended that the doctrine imposes a constructive trust on the survivor because the first to die is considered to have carried out the agreement by her death in reliance on the survivor's promise to act in accordance with the agreement. It is also important to note that these cases do not use the fraud rationale in the conventional sense of deceptive receipt of property. Instead, an estoppel argument based on representation, reliance, detriment and irrevocability is utilised.

Re Hagger [1930] 2 Ch held that the constructive trust comes into existence on the death of the first testator, however, this approach was revised in Re Hobley which decided that it must come into existence before the death of the first testator to satisfy the requirement of certainty of subject matter.

In the case of Ottaway v Norman [1972] Ch., Brightman J held that a floating obligation attaches to secret trusts: "A valid trust is created in favour of the secondary donee which is in suspense during the lifetime of the donee, but attaches to the estate of the primary donee at the moment of the latter's death." Edward Nugee QC sitting as deputy High Court judge in Re Basham [1986] 1 WLR applied a comparable test in relation to proprietary estoppel. He held that the belief, for detrimental reliance, need not relate to a clearly identified piece of property. Following Cleaver and Birmingham, if it is established by cogent evidence that the intention was to leave the entire estate, proprietary estoppel will enforce that intention. (It is interesting to recall that Edward Nugee was counsel in Ottaway v Norman and that Brightman J adopted his floating obligation theory)

== See also ==
- English trust law
