= Failure of issue =

Inheritance law concept

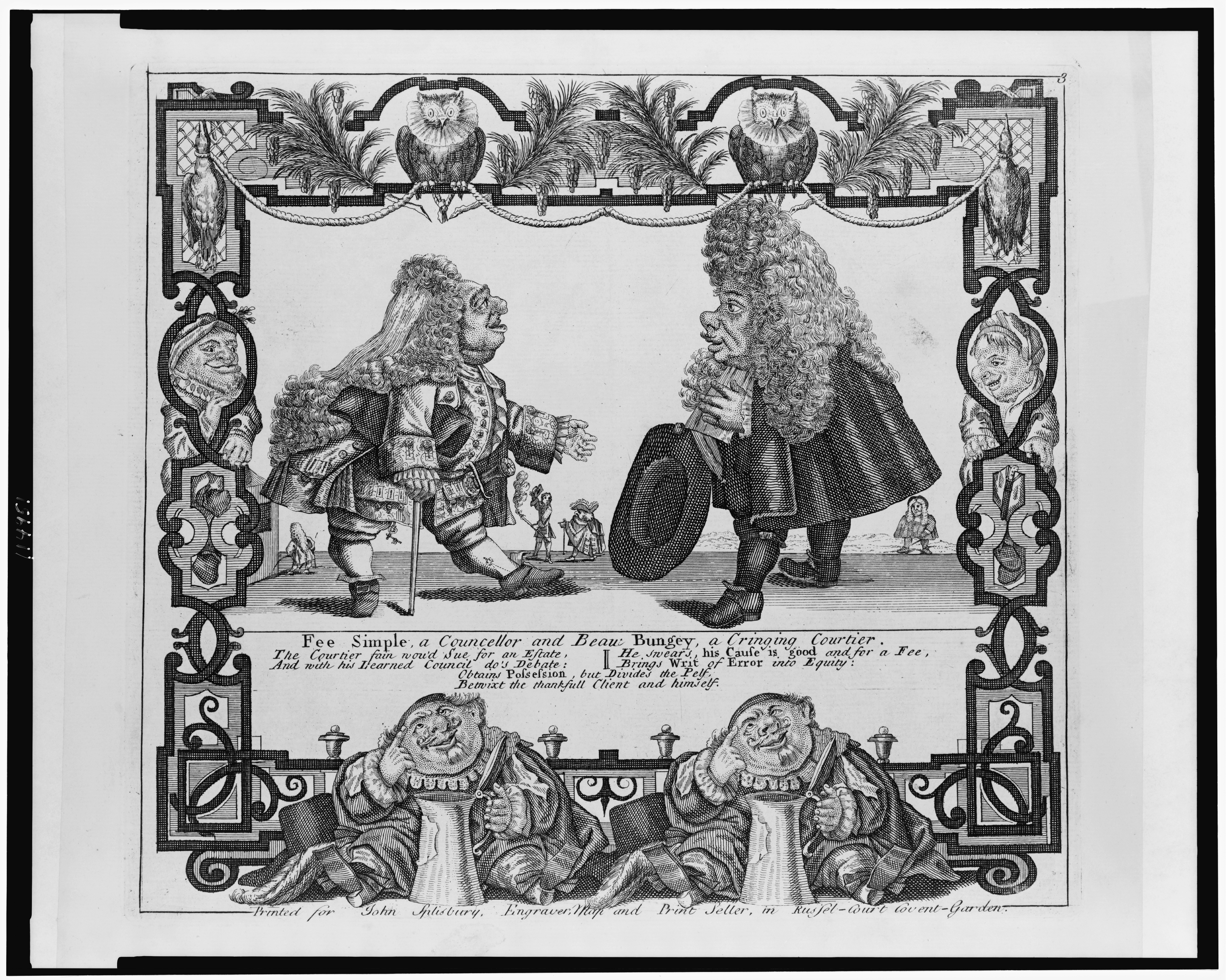
An illustration of a courtier and a landholder settling an estate: historically, fee tails were used to preserve the status of the landed gentry.

In property law, a failure of issue is a situation in which a property-holder dies without leaving children who could have inherited their property. Before the nineteenth century, common law courts recognized a system of property laws where title would revert to the original grantor upon the failure of issue, but modern laws now permit property to pass to third parties when grantees no longer have living heirs to inherit the property.

== Historical understanding ==
Between the thirteenth and seventeenth centuries, the ruling class in England was concerned with preserving the status of the landed gentry. Consequently, a system of property laws developed where estates would revert to the grantor once the tenant no longer had any living descendants (also known as a fee tail). Courts have traditionally described the reversion of property interests upon the extinction of descendants as the indefinite failure of issue. By the seventeenth century, English courts had extended this system beyond real property and also applied it to other personal property. However, by the early nineteenth century, American courts began to favor a system of definite failure of issue, where grantors could convey a property interest to a third party if a grantee no longer had any living heirs. This system was codified in England in the Wills Act 1837.

== Modern application ==
Today, most jurisdictions recognize a system of definite failure of issue where property can be conveyed to a third party upon the death of a grantees heirs. Additionally, most jurisdictions have abolished fee tails. In jurisdictions that do recognize fee tails, most courts will recognize a "fee upon indefinite failure of issue" where the property returns to the original grantor if the tenant dies without issue.

== See also ==
- Fee tail
- Property law
