= List of acts of the Parliament of Great Britain from 1751 =

This is a complete list of acts of the Parliament of Great Britain for the year 1751.

For acts passed until 1707, see the list of acts of the Parliament of England and the list of acts of the Parliament of Scotland. See also the list of acts of the Parliament of Ireland.

For acts passed from 1801 onwards, see the list of acts of the Parliament of the United Kingdom. For acts of the devolved parliaments and assemblies in the United Kingdom, see the list of acts of the Scottish Parliament, the list of acts of the Northern Ireland Assembly, and the list of acts and measures of Senedd Cymru; see also the list of acts of the Parliament of Northern Ireland.

The number shown after each act's title is its chapter number. Acts are cited using this number, preceded by the year(s) of the reign during which the relevant parliamentary session was held; thus the Union with Ireland Act 1800 is cited as "39 & 40 Geo. 3. c. 67", meaning the 67th act passed during the session that started in the 39th year of the reign of George III and which finished in the 40th year of that reign. Note that the modern convention is to use Arabic numerals in citations (thus "41 Geo. 3" rather than "41 Geo. III"). Acts of the last session of the Parliament of Great Britain and the first session of the Parliament of the United Kingdom are both cited as "41 Geo. 3".

Acts passed by the Parliament of Great Britain did not have a short title; however, some of these acts have subsequently been given a short title by acts of the Parliament of the United Kingdom (such as the Short Titles Act 1896).

Before the Acts of Parliament (Commencement) Act 1793 came into force on 8 April 1793, acts passed by the Parliament of Great Britain were deemed to have come into effect on the first day of the session in which they were passed. Because of this, the years given in the list below may in fact be the year before a particular act was passed.

== 25 Geo. 2 ==
The fifth session of the 10th Parliament of Great Britain, which met from 14 November 1751 until 26 March 1752.

This session was also traditionally cited as 25 G. 2.

=== Public acts ===
Short title	Citation	Royal assent
Long title
Taxation Act 1751 (repealed)	25 Geo. 2. c. 1	19 December 1751
An Act for continuing and granting certain Duties upon Malt, Mum, Cyder, and Perry, for the Service of the Year One Thousand Seven Hundred and Fifty-two. (Repealed by Statute Law Revision Act 1867 (30 & 31 Vict. c. 59))
Mutiny Act 1751 (repealed)	25 Geo. 2. c. 2	19 December 1751
An Act for punishing Mutiny and Desertion, and for the better Payment of the Army and their Quarters. (Repealed by Statute Law Revision Act 1867 (30 & 31 Vict. c. 59))
Land Tax Act 1751 (repealed)	25 Geo. 2. c. 3	19 December 1751
An Act for granting an Aid to His Majesty, by a Land Tax, to be raised in Great Britain, within the Space of One Year, from the Twenty fifth Day of March One Thousand Seven Hundred and Fifty-two. (Repealed by Statute Law Revision Act 1867 (30 & 31 Vict. c. 59))
Middlesex (Registry of Deeds) Act 1751 (repealed)	25 Geo. 2. c. 4	19 December 1751
An Act for appointing the Deputy or Secondary of the Chief Clerk to enrol Pleas in the King's Bench, called the Master of the King's Bench Office, One of the Registers or Masters for the Enrolment of Deeds, Wills, and other Conveyances, in the County of Middlesex, in the Place and Stead of such Chief Clerk. (Repealed by Land Registry (Middlesex Deeds) Act 1891 (54 & 55 Vict. c. 64))
Wiltshire Roads Act 1751 (repealed)	25 Geo. 2. c. 5	26 March 1752
An Act to continue and make more effectual an Act passed in the Second Year of the Reign of His present Majesty, (Note: Wiltshire Highway Act 1728 (2 Geo. 2. c. 12)) for repairing the Highways between Sheppards Shord and Hersley Upright Gate, leading down Bagdown Hill, in the County of Wilts, and other ruinous Parts of the Highways thereunto adjacent. (Repealed by Wiltshire Roads (No. 2) Act 1790 (30 Geo. 3. c. 98))
Wills Act 1751 (repealed)	25 Geo. 2. c. 6	26 March 1752
An Act for avoiding and putting an End to certain Doubts and Questions relating to the Attestation of Wills and Codicils concerning Real Estates, in that Part of Great Britain called England, and in His Majesty's Colonies and Plantations in America. (Repealed by Wills Act 1837 (7 Will. 4 & 1 Vict. c. 26))
Mercers Company, London Act 1751	25 Geo. 2. c. 7	26 March 1752
An Act to rectify a Mistake in an Act passed in the Twenty fourth Year of the Reign of His present Majesty, (Note: Mercers Company, London Act 1750 (24 Geo. 2. c. 14)) intituled, "An Act for explaining and amending an Act passed in the Twenty-first Year of His present Majesty, (Note: Mercers Company, London Act 1747 (21 Geo. 2. c. 32)) intituled, An Act for the Relief of the Annuitants of the Wardens and Commonalty of the Mystery of Mercers, in the City of London, and for other Purposes therein mentioned."
Kent Roads Act 1751 (repealed)	25 Geo. 2. c. 8	26 March 1752
An Act for repairing the Road leading from The Royal Oak on Wrotham Heath, to the Town of Wrotham, in the County of Kent, and from thence to the Village of Foot's Cray, in the said County. (Repealed by Kent Roads Act 1773 (13 Geo. 3. c. 98))
Edinburgh Beer Duties Act 1751 (repealed)	25 Geo. 2. c. 9	26 March 1752
An Act for enlarging the Term granted by Two several Acts of the Third (Note: Edinburgh Beer Duties Act 1716 (3 Geo. 1. c. 5)) and Ninth (Note: Edinburgh Beer Duties Act 1722 (9 Geo. 1. c. 14)) Years of His late Majesty's Reign, for continuing the Duty of Two Pennies Scots upon every Pint of Ale and Beer sold in the City of Edinburgh, for the Purposes therein mentioned, and for discontinuing Payment of the Petty Port Customs there. (Repealed by Statute Law Revision Act 1948 (11 & 12 Geo. 6. c. 62))
Stealing from Blacklead Mines Act 1751 (repealed)	25 Geo. 2. c. 10	26 March 1752
An Act for the more effectual securing Mines of Black Lead from Theft and Robbery. (Repealed for England and Wales by Criminal Statutes Repeal Act 1827 (7 & 8 Geo. 4. c. 27) and for India by Criminal Law (India) Act 1828 (9 Geo. 4. c. 74))
East Greenwich Church (Burial) Act 1751	25 Geo. 2. c. 11	26 March 1752
An Act to enable the Parishioners of the Parish of East Greenwich, in the County of Kent, to deposite Corpse in the Vaults or Arches under the Church in the said Parish, and to ascertain the Fees that shall be paid for the same.
Wiltshire Roads (No. 2) Act 1751 (repealed)	25 Geo. 2. c. 12	26 March 1752
An Act for repairing and widening the Road from the Town of Warminster, in the County of Wilts, to the City of Bath, in the County of Somerset, and also the Road from the Town of Frome, in the said County of Somerset, to the Town of Beckington, in the same County, and for repairing the Road from Heytesbury to Anstrow Hill, in the County of Wilts. (Repealed by Wilts and Somerset Roads (No. 2) Act 1777 (17 Geo. 3. c. 99))
Gloucester Roads Act 1751 (repealed)	25 Geo. 2. c. 13	26 March 1752
An Act for repairing the Road from the Town of Cirencester, to the Town of Stroud, and that Part of Rodborough Hill which leads to Dudbridge, and also the Road leading from Cirencester towards Bisley, so far as the Bottom of Gulph Hill, all in the County of Gloucester. (Repealed by Cirencester Roads Act 1825 (6 Geo. 4. c. cxliii))
Importation Act 1751 (repealed)	25 Geo. 2. c. 14	26 March 1752
An Act to open the Port of Lancaster for the Importation of Wool and Woollen Yarn from Ireland. (Repealed by Statute Law Revision Act 1867 (30 & 31 Vict. c. 59))
Indemnity Act 1751 (repealed)	25 Geo. 2. c. 15	26 March 1752
An Act to indemnify Persons who have omitted to qualify themselves for Offices and Employments, and also Persons who have omitted to make and file Affidavits of the Execution of Articles of Clerkship, within the Time limited by Law, and for allowing further Time for those Purposes. (Repealed by Statute Law Revision Act 1867 (30 & 31 Vict. c. 59))
Tittensor Turnpike Act 1751 (repealed)	25 Geo. 2. c. 16	26 March 1752
An Act for enlarging the Term and Powers granted by Two Acts of Parliament, (Note: Tittensor Turnpike Act 1713 (13 Ann. c. 31)) (Note: Tittensor Turnpike Act 1734 (8 Geo. 2. c. 5)) for repairing and amending the Highways between the Town or Village of Tittensor and the most Northern Part of Talk on the Hill, in Butt-Lane, in the County of Stafford. (Repealed by Darlaston Turnpike Act 1779 (19 Geo. 3. c. 119))
Wiltshire and Somerset Roads Act 1751 (repealed)	25 Geo. 2. c. 17	26 March 1752
An Act for repairing the Road leading from The Green Man, in the Chapelry of Seend, in the County of Wilts, through Trowbridge, to a Place called White Trough, in the Parish of Trowbridge, in the same County, and from thence, by Road Church, to Beckington, in the County of Somerset. (Repealed by Wilts and Somerset Roads Act 1768 (8 Geo. 3. c. 49))
Northumberland Roads Act 1751 (repealed)	25 Geo. 2. c. 18	26 March 1752
An Act for repairing the Road leading from Long Horsley Bar, or Gate, on the Post Road near the Town of Morpeth, by or through Long Horsley, Weldon Bridge, and Whittingham, to the River Breamish, and from thence to Piercy's Cross, in the County of Northumberland. (Repealed by Morpeth and Piercy's Cross Road (Northumberland) Act 1799 (39 Geo. 3. c. xliii))
Importation (No. 2) Act 1751 (repealed)	25 Geo. 2. c. 19	26 March 1752
An Act to open the Port of Great Yarmouth, for the Importation of Wool and Woollen Yarn from Ireland. (Repealed by Statute Law Revision Act 1867 (30 & 31 Vict. c. 59))
Admission of Vassals (Scotland) Act 1751 (repealed)	25 Geo. 2. c. 20	26 March 1752
An Act to obviate Doubts that have arisen, with regard to the Admission of the Vassals of the Principality of Scotland, and Payment of their Rents and Duties. (Repealed by Statute Law Revision Act 1948 (11 & 12 Geo. 6. c. 62))
Berkshire Roads Act 1751 (repealed)	25 Geo. 2. c. 21	26 March 1752
An Act for repairing the Roads from Wallingford, in the County of Berks, to Wantage and from thence to Farringdon, and also from Wantage to Idson, in the said County. (Repealed by Nuffield and Faringdon Road Act 1799 (39 Geo. 3. c. xxxvii) and Nuffield and Faringdon Road Act 1841 (5 Vict. c. cvii))
Shrewsbury and Wrexham Road Act 1751 (repealed)	25 Geo. 2. c. 22	26 March 1752
An Act for repairing the Roads from the Town of Shrewsbury, through Ellesmere in the County of Salop, and Overton in the County of Flint, to Wrexham in the County of Denbigh. (Repealed by Shrewsbury to Wrexham Road Act 1813 (53 Geo. 3. c. cxxxii), Broughton and Mold Roads Act 1822 (3 Geo. 4. c. l), Road from Chester to Northop Act 1828 (9 Geo. 4. c. lxxiv), Road from Chester to Wrexham Act 1828 (9 Geo. 4. c. lxxvii) and Sevenoaks, Tunbridge Wells and Woodsgate Roads Amendment Act 1837 (1 & 2 Vict. c. xvii))
Saint Margaret and Saint John the Evangelist, Westminster (Poor Relief, etc.) Act 1751 (repealed)	25 Geo. 2. c. 23	26 March 1752
An Act for the better Relief and Employment of the Poor of the Parishes of St. Margaret and St. John the Evangelist, in the City of Westminster, and for cleansing the Streets, and repairing the Highways, within the said Parishes. (Repealed by London Government (City of Westminster) Order in Council 1901 (SR&O 1901/278))
Wiltshire and Somerset Roads (No. 2) Act 1751	25 Geo. 2. c. 24	26 March 1752
An Act for repairing and widening the Roads from Tinhead Hill to the Round Stone in Trowbridge, and from Flinty Nap to Western Down, in the Parish of Edington, in the County of Wilts, and other Roads in the Counties of Wilts and Somerset, leading towards the Cities of Bristol and Bath.
National Debt Act 1751 (repealed)	25 Geo. 2. c. 25	26 March 1752
An Act for granting to His Majesty a certain Sum of Money, therein mentioned, out of the Sinking Fund, and for enabling His Majesty to raise a further Sum of Money, therein also mentioned, by Exchequer Bills, to be charged on the said Sinking Fund, for the Service of the Year One Thousand Seven Hundred and Fifty-two, and for the further appropriating the Supplies granted in this Session of Parliament. (Repealed by Statute Law Revision Act 1870 (33 & 34 Vict. c. 69))
Insurances on Foreign Ships Act 1751 (repealed)	25 Geo. 2. c. 26	26 March 1752
An Act to restrain the making Insurances on Foreign Ships bound to or from The East Indies. (Repealed by Insurances on Foreign Ships Act 1757 (31 Geo. 2. c. 27))
National Debt (No. 2) Act 1751 (repealed)	25 Geo. 2. c. 27	26 March 1752
An Act for converting the several Annuities therein mentioned into several Joint Stocks of Annuities transferrable at the Bank of England, to be charged on the Sinking Fund, and also for consolidating the several other Annuities therein mentioned into several Joint Stocks of Annuities transferrable at the South Sea House. (Repealed by Statute Law Revision Act 1870 (33 & 34 Vict. c. 69))
Post Roads in Scotland Act 1751 (repealed)	25 Geo. 2. c. 28	26 March 1752
An Act for repairing the Post Road from the City of Edinburgh, through the Counties of Linlithgow and Sterling, from the Boathouse Ford on Almond Water, and from thence to the Town of Linlithgow, and from the said Town to Falkirk, and from thence to Sterling, and also from Falkirk to Kilsyth, and to Inch Bellie Bridge, on the Post Road to the City of Glasgow. (Repealed by Linlithgow Roads Act 1790 (30 Geo. 3. c. 105))
Coroners Act 1751 (repealed)	25 Geo. 2. c. 29	26 March 1752
An Act for giving a proper Reward to Coroners, for the due Execution of then Office, and for the Amoval of Coroners, upon a lawful Conviction, for certain Misdemeanors. (Repealed by Liberty of Ely Act 1837 (7 Will. 4 & 1 Vict. c. 53), Statute Law Revision Act 1867 (30 & 31 Vict. c. 59) and Coroners Act 1887 (50 & 51 Vict. c. 71))
Calendar Act 1751	25 Geo. 2. c. 30	26 March 1752
An Act to amend an Act made in the last Session of Parliament, intituled, "An Act for regulating the Commencement of the Year, and for correcting the Calendar now in Use." (Note: Calendar (New Style) Act 1750 (24 Geo. 2. c. 23))
Distemper Amongst Cattle Act 1751 (repealed)	25 Geo. 2. c. 31	26 March 1752
An Act to continue, explain, and amend, several Laws, more effectually to prevent the spreading of the Distemper which now rages amongst the Horned Cattle in this Kingdom. (Repealed by Statute Law Revision Act 1867 (30 & 31 Vict. c. 59))
Importation, etc. Act 1751 (repealed)	25 Geo. 2. c. 32	26 March 1752
An Act to allow the Importation of Gum Senega into this Kingdom, from any Part of Europe, upon the Payment of a Duty, and for Relief of James Guthrie, with respect to the Duties paid and secured upon a Quantity of Tobacco burnt at the Port of Kircudbright, and for giving further Time for Payment of Duties omitted to be paid for the Indentures or Contracts of Clerks and Apprentices. (Repealed by Statute Law Revision Act 1867 (30 & 31 Vict. c. 59))
Morpeth and Elsdon Road Act 1751	25 Geo. 2. c. 33	26 March 1752
An Act for repairing the Road leading from the Town of Morpeth, by or through Mitford, Thropple, Long Witton, and by the North Side of Rothley Park Wall, to Sting Cross, and to the High Cross in Elsdon, in the County of Northumberland.
Small Debts, Birmingham Act 1751 (repealed)	25 Geo. 2. c. 34	26 March 1752
An Act for the more easy and speedy Recovery of small Debts, within the Town of Birmingham and Hamlet of Deritend, thereto adjoining, in the County of Warwick. (Repealed by County Courts Act 1846 (9 & 10 Vict. c. 95))
Growth of Coffee, etc. Act 1751 (repealed)	25 Geo. 2. c. 35	26 March 1752
An Act for continuing the Act for encouraging the Growth of Coffee in His Majesty's Plantations in America, and also for continuing, under certain Regulations, so much of an Act as relates to the Premiums upon the Importation of Masts, Yards, and Bowsprits, Tar, Pitch, and Turpentine. (Repealed by Statute Law Revision Act 1867 (30 & 31 Vict. c. 59))
Disorderly Houses Act 1751 (repealed)	25 Geo. 2. c. 36	26 March 1752
An Act for the better preventing Thefts and Roberries, and for regulating Places of publick Entertainment, and punishing Persons keeping disorderly Houses. (Repealed by Statute Law (Repeals) Act 2008 (c. 12))
Murder Act 1751 (repealed)	25 Geo. 2. c. 37	26 March 1752
An Act for better preventing the horrid Crime of Murder. (Repealed by Statute Law (Repeals) Act 1973 (c. 39))
Small Debts, Saint Albans Act 1751 (repealed)	25 Geo. 2. c. 38	26 March 1752
An Act for the more easy and speedy Recovery of small Debts, within the Borough of Saint Albans, in the County of Hertford, and the several Towns, Parishes, Wards, Hamlets, and Places, within the Liberty of Saint Albans. (Repealed by County Courts Act 1846 (9 & 10 Vict. c. 95))
British Subjects Act 1751 (repealed)	25 Geo. 2. c. 39	26 March 1752
An Act to obviate Doubts that may arise upon an Act made and passed in the Eleventh and Twelfth Years of the Reign of His late Majesty King William the Third, intituled, "An Act to enable His Majesty's natural-born Subjects to inherit the Estate of their Ancestors, either Lineal or Collateral, notwithstanding their Father or Mother were Aliens." (Note: Aliens Act 1698 (11 Will. 3. c. 6)) (Repealed by Law of Property (Amendment) Act 1924 (15 & 16 Geo. 5. c. 5))
African Company Act 1751 (repealed)	25 Geo. 2. c. 40	26 March 1752
An Act for the Application of a Sum of Money therein mentioned, granted to His Majesty, for making Compensation and Satisfaction to the Royal African Company of England, for their Charter Lands, Forts, Castles, Slaves, Military Stores, and all other their Effects whatsoever, and to vest the Lands, Forts, Castles, Slaves, and Military Stores, and all other their Effects, in the Company of Merchants trading to Africa, and for other Purposes in the Act mentioned. (Repealed by Statute Law Revision Act 1867 (30 & 31 Vict. c. 59))
Crown Lands (Forfeited Estates) Act 1751 (repealed)	25 Geo. 2. c. 41	26 March 1752
An Act for annexing certain Forfeited Estates in Scotland to the Crown unalienably, and for making Satisfaction to the lawful Creditors thereupon, and to establish a Method of managing the same, and applying the Rents and Profits thereof for the better civilizing and improving The Highlands of Scotland, and preventing Disorders there for the future. (Repealed by Crown Lands (Forfeited Estates) Act 1784 (24 Geo. 3. Sess. 2. c. 57))
Greenwich Hospital Act 1751	25 Geo. 2. c. 42	26 March 1752
An Act to render valid and effectual all Contracts and Agreements, which shall be made by the Commissioners or Governors of the Royal Hospital for Seamen at Greenwich, for the Purchase of Lands, Tenements, and Hereditaments, for the finishing and completing the said Hospital, and for ascertaining the Recompense that shall be made for the same.
Small Debts, Liverpool Act 1751 (repealed)	25 Geo. 2. c. 43	26 March 1752
An Act for the more easy and speedy Recovery of small Debts, in the Town and Port of Liverpoole and Liberties thereof, in the County Palatine of Lancaster. (Repealed by Liverpool Court of Passage Act 1834 (4 & 5 Will. 4. c. xcii) and Liverpool Court of Requests Act 1836 (6 & 7 Will. 4. c. cxxxv))
Scarborough Harbour Act 1751 (repealed)	25 Geo. 2. c. 44	26 March 1752
An Act to explain and amend an Act passed in the Fifth Year of His present Majesty's Reign, intituled, "An Act to enlarge the Pier and Harbour of Scarborough, in the County of York," (Note: Scarborough Harbour Act 1731 (5 Geo. 2. c. 11)) and for making the said Act more effectual. (Repealed by Scarborough Harbour Act 1843 (6 & 7 Vict. c. xl))
Small Debts, Canterbury Act 1751 (repealed)	25 Geo. 2. c. 45	26 March 1752
An Act for the more easy and speedy Recovery of small Debts, within the City and County of the City of Canterbury and the Liberties and Precincts of the same. (Repealed by County Courts Act 1846 (9 & 10 Vict. c. 95) and Local Government Board's Provisional Orders Confirmation (No. 9) Act 1890 (53 & 54 Vict. c. clxxviii))
Northumberland Roads (No. 2) Act 1751 (repealed)	25 Geo. 2. c. 46	26 March 1752
An Act for repairing and widening the Road from Alemouth through the Town of Alnwick, to Rothbury, and from thence to the Town of Hexham, and also the Road leading out of the aforesaid Road, between Alnwick and Rothbury, to Jockey's Dike Bridge, in the County of Northumberland. (Repealed by Northumberland Roads Act 1779 (19 Geo. 3. c. 95))
Yorkshire Roads Act 1751 (repealed)	25 Geo. 2. c. 47	26 March 1752
An Act for repairing and widening the Roads from the East End of Monk Bridge, (Note: Monk Bridge takes the A1036 road across the River Foss to the east of York city centre. 53°57′55″N 1°04′28″W) near the Suburbs of the City of York, to New Malton, and from thence to Scarborough, in the North Riding of the County of York, and also from Spittlehouse, in the East Riding of the said County, to Scarborough aforesaid. (Repealed by York and Scarborough Roads Act 1798 (38 Geo. 3. c. xxxvii))
Northumberland Roads (No. 3) Act 1751 (repealed)	25 Geo. 2. c. 48	26 March 1752
An Act for repairing and widening the Road leading from a Part of the Road directed to be repaired by an Act passed in the last Session of Parliament, (Note: Carlisle and Newcastle Road Act 1750 (24 Geo. 2. c. 25)) from Carlisle to Newcastle upon Tyne, near Glenwelt, to another Part of the Road so making from Carlisle to Newcastle, upon Shildon Common, in the County of Northumberland. (Repealed by Northumberland Roads (No. 2) Act 1778 (18 Geo. 3. c. 115))
Shropshire Roads Act 1751 (repealed)	25 Geo. 2. c. 49	26 March 1752
An Act for repairing the High Road from the Town of Shrewsbury, through Cressage, Harley, Much Wenlock, by Muckley Cross, and through Morville, to Bridgenorth, in the County of Salop. (Repealed by Shrewsbury, Wenlock and Bridgnorth Turnpike Roads Act 1851 (14 & 15 Vict. c. xxiv))
Sussex Roads Act 1751 (repealed)	25 Geo. 2. c. 50	26 March 1752
An Act for repairing the Roads from the North End of Malling Street, near the Town of Lewes, to Witch Cross, and from the North End of Malling Street aforesaid to The Broil Park Gate, and from Offham to Witch Cross aforesaid, all lying within the County of Sussex. (Repealed by Lewes Roads Act 1821 (1 & 2 Geo. 4. c. xiv) and Roads from Lewes Act 1830 (11 Geo. 4 & 1 Will. 4. c. lxxxii))
South London Roads Act 1751 (repealed)	25 Geo. 2. c. 51	26 March 1752
An Act for amending and making more effectual several Acts, for amending the Roads from the City of London to East Grinstead in the County of Sussex, and to the Towns of Sutton and Kingston in the County of Surrey, and for more effectually repairing the Road from Newington, through Camberwell, in the said County, to New Cross in the County of Kent, and for repairing and widening the Road from Camberwell Green to The Fox under the Hill in the Parish of Camberwell. (Repealed by Statute Law (Repeals) Act 2013 (c. 2))
Wiltshire and Somerset Roads (No. 3) Act 1751 (repealed)	25 Geo. 2. c. 52	26 March 1752
An Act for widening and repairing the Road from Combe Bridge in the County of Somerset, to Bradford in the County of Wilts, and from thence through Hilperton, and so far over Ashton Common as to join the Road which leads from Steeple Ashton to Trowbridge, and also the Road leading from Bradford aforesaid to Cockhill Gate, in the said County of Wilts. (Repealed by Wiltshire and Somerset Roads and Stokeford Bridge Act 1798 (38 Geo. 3. c. viii))
Knaresborough and Green Hammerton Road Act 1751 (repealed)	25 Geo. 2. c. 53	26 March 1752
An Act for repairing the Road from Knaresborough, in the County of York, by Longflat Lane, Gouldsborough Fields, (Note: Gouldsborough Fields, off the A59 east of Knaresborough. 54°00′33″N 1°24′41″W) Flaxby, (Note: Flaxby, Yorkshire. 54°00′56″N 1°23′51″W) Allerton Maulenerer, (Note: Allerton Mauleverer, Yorkshire.) and Scate Moor, (Note: Scate Moor, off the A59, west of Green Hammerton.54°00′10″N 1°19′39″W) to Green Hammerton, (Note: Green Hammerton, Yorkshire. 54°00′20″N 1°18′06″W) in the same County, and for making the same a High Carriage Road. (Repealed by Knaresborough and Green Hammerton Turnpike Road Act 1856 (19 & 20 Vict. c. xlix))
Taunton Roads Act 1751 (repealed)	25 Geo. 2. c. 54	26 March 1752
An Act for amending the several Roads leading from the Town of Taunton, in the County of Somerset. (Repealed by Taunton Roads Act 1778 (18 Geo. 3. c. 97))
Leeds and Halifax Roads Act 1751 (repealed)	25 Geo. 2. c. 55	26 March 1752
An Act for explaining and amending so much of an Act passed in the Fourteenth Year of the Reign of His present Majesty, (Note: Leeds and Halifax Roads Act 1740 (14 Geo. 2. c. 32)) for the repairing and enlarging the Roads from the Town of Selby, in the West Riding of the County of York, to the Town of Leeds, and from thence, in Two several Branches, one through Bradford and Horton, and the other through Bowling and Wibsey, to the Town of Halifax, in the same Riding, as relates to that Part of the said Roads which lies between Leeds and Halifax. (Repealed by Leeds and Halifax Turnpike Roads and Branches Act 1825 (6 Geo. 4. c. cxlix))
Hereford Roads Act 1751 (repealed)	25 Geo. 2. c. 56	26 March 1752
An Act for repairing the several Roads leading from the Town of Bromyard in the County of Hereford, to the several Places called The Halfway Ash in the Parish of Docklow, Herefordshire Lake in the Parish of Whitburne, Perry Bridge in the Parish of Stoke Bliss, leading through the several Parishes of Edwin, Ralph, Collington, and the Hamlet of Little Kyre, Sapey Wood in the Parish of Upper Sapey, Bishop's Froome, Wooferwood Gate, and Herefordshire Lake, in the said Parish of Bromyard, in the Counties of Hereford and Worcester. (Repealed by Hereford Roads Act 1791 (31 Geo. 3. c. 130))
Market Harborough and Brampton Road Act 1751 (repealed)	25 Geo. 2. c. 57	26 March 1752
An Act for repairing and widening the Road leading from Market Harborough, in the County of Leicester, through Desborough, Rowell, Kettering, Barton, Seagrave, and Thrapston, in the County of Northampton, and through Bythorne, Spaldwick, and Ellington, to the Pound in the Parish of Brampton, in the County of Huntingdon. (Repealed by Market Harborough and Brampton Road Act 1820 (1 Geo. 4. c. lxxx) and Road from Market Harborough to Brampton (Huntingdonshire) Road Act 1841 (4 & 5 Vict. c. xxxv))
Yorkshire Roads (No. 3) Act 1751 (repealed)	25 Geo. 2. c. 58	26 March 1752
An Act for repairing the Roads from the Town of Leeds, through Harwood, to the South West Corner of the Enclosures of Harrogate, and from thence, in Two Branches, one through Ripley over Burage Green, and the other through Knaresborough and Borough Bridge, to Ripon, and from thence to the First Rill of Water, or Water-course, on Hutton Moor, in the County of York, and for repairing the Sloughs or Ruts on the said Moor. (Repealed by Leeds to Harrogate Road Act 1819 (59 Geo. 3. c. i) and Road from Leeds to Harrogate Act 1839 (2 & 3 Vict. c. xxxii))
Wiltshire and Gloucester Roads Act 1751 (repealed)	25 Geo. 2. c. 59	26 March 1752
An Act for repairing and widening the Roads leading from Chippenham Bridge in the County of Wilts, to the Top of Togg Hill in the County of Gloucester, and from Chippenham Bridge aforesaid to the Top of Old Sodbury Hill, in the said County of Gloucester. (Repealed by Wilts Roads Act 1768 (8 Geo. 3. c. 48))
Worcestershire Roads Act 1751 (repealed)	25 Geo. 2. c. 60	26 March 1752
An Act for repairing and amending the several Roads leading from the West End of Upon Bridge in the County of Worcester, to the Parish of Tirley in the County of Gloucester, and to the Parish of Colwall in the County of Hereford, and to the further Side of a Place called The Rid Green in the Road to the City of Worcester, and through a Place called Roberts End Street to Malvern Chace in the said County of Worcester. (Repealed by Upton-upon-Severn Roads Act 1825 (6 Geo. 4. c. cliii))

=== Private acts ===
Short title	Citation	Royal assent
Long title
Oxenden's Name Act 1751	25 Geo. 2. c. 1 Pr.	19 December 1751
An Act for enabling George Oxenden Esquire and his Heirs to use the Surname, Arms, and Crest, of Dixwell, pursuant to the Will of Sir Basill Dixwell Baronet, deceased.
Duke of Devonshire's Estate Act 1751	25 Geo. 2. c. 2 Pr.	26 March 1752
An Act for enabling William Duke of Devonshire to make Provision for his Younger Sons, out of his Estate in the County of Huntingdon.
Correcting a settlement concerning Peregrine Duke of Ancaster and Kesteven's family estates and enabling the raising of his daughter's portions.	25 Geo. 2. c. 3 Pr.	26 March 1752
An Act for supplying certain Defects and Omissions in a Settlement of the Family Estates of Peregrine Duke of Ancaster and Kesteven, by enabling him to raise Portions thereout for his Daughters, in the Manner therein mentioned.
Marquis of Powis' Estate Act 1751	25 Geo. 2. c. 4 Pr.	26 March 1752
An Act for empowering the Trustees of the Will of William late Marquis of Powis to make Sales, Exchanges, and Leases, of divers Parts of his Estate, for the Purposes therein mentioned, and for making the Exemplification of the same Will, and attested Copies of the Enrolment thereof, Evidence in all Courts in Great Britain.
Lord Blantyre's Estate Act 1751	25 Geo. 2. c. 5 Pr.	26 March 1752
An Act to enable the Right Honourable William Lord Blantyre, and the Heirs of Entail for the Time being, to alienate, by Way of Exchange or Excambion, certain Lands in the Constabulary of Hadington, and Shire of Edinburgh.
Lord Mansel's Estate Act 1751	25 Geo. 2. c. 6 Pr.	26 March 1752
An Act for confirming a Lease, or Grant, made by the Devisees of the Real Estate late of the Right Honourable Bussy late Lord Mansel, in the County of Glamorgan, to Rowland Pytt Iron-master, for certain Purposes therein expressed.
Harbord's Estates Act 1751	25 Geo. 2. c. 7 Pr.	26 March 1752
An Act for Sale of certain Estates, in the Counties of Norfolk and Suffolk, comprized in the Marriage Settlements of Sir William Harbord Baronet, and Knight of the most Honourable Order of the Bath; and for purchasing other Estates, to be settled to the like Uses, in Lieu thereof.
Heathcote's Estate Act 1751	25 Geo. 2. c. 8 Pr.	26 March 1752
An Act for providing and securing Portions and Maintenance for the Younger Sons and Daughter of Sir Thomas Heathcote Baronet.
Bland's Estate Act 1751	25 Geo. 2. c. 9 Pr.	26 March 1752
An Act for vesting divers Manors and Lands, in the Counties of Lancaster and Chester, devised by the Will of the late Sir John Bland Baronet, deceased, in the present Sir John Bland, in Fee Simple, discharged of the Trust of the said Will, and for settling an Estate in the County of York, in Lieu thereof, and in Exchange for the same.
Mackinzie's Estate Act 1751	25 Geo. 2. c. 10 Pr.	26 March 1752
An Act for Sale of Part of the entailed Estate of Sir George Mackinzie Knight, deceased, lying in that Part of Great Britain called Scotland, and for purchasing other Estates, to be settled to the same Uses, and for other Purposes therein mentioned.
Bacon's Estate Act 1751	25 Geo. 2. c. 11 Pr.	26 March 1752
An Act for vesting divers Lands and Hereditaments, in the County of Oxford, devised by the Will and Codicil of Nathaniel Bacon Esquire, deceased, in Edward Bacon Esquire, in Fee Simple, and for settling an Estate in the County of Norfolk, of greater Value, to the Uses limited by the same Will and Codicil.
Wyndham's Estates Act 1751	25 Geo. 2. c. 12 Pr.	26 March 1752
An Act to empower the Guardians of William Wyndham Esquire, an Infant, to make Leases and Copyhold Grants of his Estates, in the Manor of Uphaven, and in Lyfton and Odcombe, in the Counties of Wilts and Somerset, during his Minority.
Hopton's Estate Act 1751	25 Geo. 2. c. 13 Pr.	26 March 1752
An Act for Sale of the Moiety of the Manor of Icombe, Part of the settled Estate of Richard Hopton Esquire and others, and laying out the Money arising thereby in the Purchase of an entire Estate, to be settled to the same Uses.
Southcote's Estate Act 1751	25 Geo. 2. c. 14 Pr.	26 March 1752
An Act to empower the Committee or Committees of Thomas Southcote Esquire, a Lunatick, for the Time being, to make Leases and Copyhold Grants of his Estates, in the Counties of Berks, Essex, and Surrey, and for other Purposes therein mentioned.
Barnesley's Estate Act 1751	25 Geo. 2. c. 15 Pr.	26 March 1752
An Act for vesting the Real Estate of William Barnesley Esquire, deceased, in Trustees, for the Benefit of William Barnesley Esquire, his only Son and Heir, who is a Lunatick, and for raising Money, to pay the Costs of several Suits and Proceedings at Law and in Equity, brought for Recovery of the said Estate.
Wicker's Estate Act 1751	25 Geo. 2. c. 16 Pr.	26 March 1752
An Act for vesting the Manor of Stepney, and divers Lands and Hereditaments, in the Parish of Stepney, in the County of Middlesex, comprized in the Marriage Settlement of John Wicker Esquire, in him and his Heirs, and for settling Lands, in the Counties of Sussex, Surrey, and Kent, in Lieu thereof, to the Uses of that Settlement.
Preston's Estate Act 1751	25 Geo. 2. c. 17 Pr.	26 March 1752
An Act to empower John Preston Merchant to make a Jointure on any future Marriage.
Enabling the Treasury to compound with George Whitehead and his sureties, John and Thomas Whitehead, for a debt due to the Crown for tobacco customs.	25 Geo. 2. c. 18 Pr.	26 March 1752
An Act to enable the Commissioners for executing the Office of Treasurer of His Majesty's Exchequer, or the Lord High Treasurer, for the Time being, to compound with George Whitehead of Bristol Merchant, and his Sureties John Whitehead and Thomas Whitehead, a Debt due to the Crown, for Customs for Tobacco.
Lascelles' Divorce Act 1751	25 Geo. 2. c. 19 Pr.	26 March 1752
An Act to dissolve the Marriage of Daniel Lascelles of London Merchant with Elizabeth Southwicke, his now Wife, and to enable him to marry again, and for other Purposes therein mentioned.
Benson's Divorce Act 1751	25 Geo. 2. c. 20 Pr.	26 March 1752
An Act to dissolve the Marriage of Thomas Benson Gentlemen with Jane Board, his now Wife, and to enable him to marry again, and for other Purposes therein mentioned.
Enabling the King to grant the inheritance of the manor of Crowland (Lincolnshire) to trustees, for Thomas Orby Hunter and his heirs, upon a full and valuable consideration to be paid for the same.	25 Geo. 2. c. 21 Pr.	26 March 1752
An Act to enable His Majesty to grant the Inheritance of the Manor of Crowland, in the County of Lincoln, to Trustees, in Trust for Thomas Orby Hunter Esquire and his Heirs, upon a full and valuable Consideration to be paid for the same.
Extinguishing the right of the Lord of the manor of Ombersley (Worcestershire) of keeping a warren for conies on Linall Common, Birchin Valley and the Lyth, securing for him the rent now paid for the same and annexing and uniting said Birchin Valley to several ancient copyholds and customary tenements within said manor.	25 Geo. 2. c. 22 Pr.	26 March 1752
An Act to extinguish the Right of the Lord of the Manor of Ombersley, in the County of Worcester, of keeping a Warren for Conies, on Linall Common, The Birchin Valley, and The Lyth, and for securing to the said Lord the Rent now paid for the same, and for annexing and uniting the said Birchin Valley to several ancient Copyholds, or Customary Tenements, within the said Manor.
Narborough Inclosure Act 1751	25 Geo. 2. c. 23 Pr.	26 March 1752
An Act for dividing and enclosing the Common Fields and Common Meadows of Norborow, otherwise Narborough, in the County of Leicester.
Ridley Inclosure Act 1751	25 Geo. 2. c. 24 Pr.	26 March 1752
An Act for confirming Articles of Agreement and an Award, for enclosing and dividing certain Wastes and Commons, in the Manor of Ridley, in the County of Northumberland.
Drayton Inclosure Act 1751	25 Geo. 2. c. 25 Pr.	26 March 1752
An Act for dividing and enclosing the Common Fields, Common Pastures, Common Meadows, Common Grounds, and Waste Grounds, in the Hamlet of Drayton, within the Parish of Daventry, in the County of Northampton.
Snaith, Cowick and Rawcliffe (Yorkshire) Inclosures Act 1751	25 Geo. 2. c. 26 Pr.	26 March 1752
An Act for establishing and rendering effectual certain Articles of Agreement, for the enclosing and dividing the Commons and Waste Grounds in the Townships of Snaith, Cowick, and Rawcliffe, in the County of York.
Witham on the Hill Infield Inclosure etc. Act 1751	25 Geo. 2. c. 27 Pr.	26 March 1752
An Act for enclosing and dividing Wytham on the Hill In Field, in the County of Lincoln, and for settling a Stipend on the Vicar, in Lieu of Glebe and Tithes.
Chandler's Name Act 1751	25 Geo. 2. c. 28 Pr.	26 March 1752
An Act to empower Richard Chandler Esquire and Elizabeth his Wife, and their Issue, to take and use the Surname of Cavendish.
Cave's Name Act 1751	25 Geo. 2. c. 29 Pr.	26 March 1752
An Act to enable John Cive, now called John Browne, and his Issue, to take and use the Surname of Browne.
Archer's Name Act 1751	25 Geo. 2. c. 30 Pr.	26 March 1752
An Act to enable Michael Archer Esquire and his Issue Male to take and use the Surname of Newton only, and to take and use the Coat of Arms of the Family of Newton.
Naturalization of Jane Magdalen Robelon Act 1751	25 Geo. 2. c. 31 Pr.	26 March 1752
An Act for naturalizing Jane Magdolen Robelon.
Degen's Naturalization Act 1751	25 Geo. 2. c. 32 Pr.	26 March 1752
An Act for naturalizing Francis Degen.
Miller's Naturalization Act 1751	25 Geo. 2. c. 33 Pr.	26 March 1752
An Act for naturalizing John Matthias Miller.
Naturalization of Frederick Commerell, John Toopken and Christian Moser Act 1751	25 Geo. 2. c. 34 Pr.	26 March 1752
An Act for naturalizing Frederick William Commerell, John Anthony Toopken, and Christian Gottlieb Moser.
Geledneks' Naturalization Act 1751	25 Geo. 2. c. 35 Pr.	26 March 1752
An Act for naturalizing Christian Samuel Geledneks.
Denoyer's Naturalization Act 1751	25 Geo. 2. c. 36 Pr.	26 March 1752
An Act for naturalizing Philip Denoyer.
Fremeaux's Naturalization Act 1751	25 Geo. 2. c. 37 Pr.	26 March 1752
An Act for naturalizing James Fremeaux Merchant.
Girardot's Naturalization Act 1751	25 Geo. 2. c. 38 Pr.	26 March 1752
An Act for naturalizing Andrew Girardot.
Naturalization of Peter Auriol and David Pratviel Act 1751	25 Geo. 2. c. 39 Pr.	26 March 1752
An Act for naturalizing Peter Auriol and David Pratviel, of London, Merchants.
Naturalization of Andrew Leques and Frederick Blomberg Act 1751	25 Geo. 2. c. 40 Pr.	26 March 1752
An Act for naturalizing Andrew Annibal Leques and Frederick Charles Augustus Blomberg.
Meybohm's Naturalization Act 1751	25 Geo. 2. c. 41 Pr.	26 March 1752
An Act for naturalizing Johan Meijbohm.

=== Sources ===
- Pickering, Danby, ed. (1765). "Anno vicesimo quinto Georgii II.". The Statutes at Large. Vol. 20: From the 23rd to the 26th Year of King George II. Printed by J. Bentham. pp. 321–424 – via Internet Archive.
- Pickering, Danby, ed. (1765). "Anno vicesimo quinto Georgii II.". The Statutes at Large. Vol. 20: From the 23rd to the 26th Year of King George II. Printed by J. Bentham. pp. 321–424 – via Google Books.
- Pickering, Danby, ed. (1765). "Anno vicesimo quinto Georgii II.". The Statutes at Large. Vol. 20: From the 23rd to the 26th Year of King George II. C. Eyre and A. Strahan. pp. 321–424 – via Internet Archive.
- Journals of the House of Commons. Vol. 26. London: His Majesty's Stationery Office. 1803. pp. 298–518 – via Google Books.
- Chronological Table of and Index to the Statutes. Vol. 1: To the End of the Session 59 Vict. Sess. 2 (1895) (13th ed.). London: Her Majesty's Stationery Office. 1896. pp. 114–115 – via Google Books.
- "Acts of the Parliament of Great Britain from 1751". legislation.gov.uk. The National Archives.

== See also ==
- List of acts of the Parliament of Great Britain
