= Beneficium inventarii =

Beneficium inventarii (literally benefit of the inventory) is a legal doctrine introduced into Roman law by Justinian I to limit the liability of heirs resulting from an insolvent estate.

The beneficium inventarii (French: bénéfice d'invenataire) also occurred in article 793 of the Napoleonic Code (1804), which became the basis of most of the following civil codes, in force in countries such as France and Italy.

The doctrine, which is in force today in many civil law systems, applies to both wills and intestate successions. An heir may accept a succession under beneficium inventarii without being liable for the debts attaching to the estate or to the claims of legatees beyond the estate's value as previously determined by inventory.
