= Law Reform (Succession) Act 1995 =

Act of the Parliament of the United Kingdom

Law Reform (Succession) Act 1995 (Note: Section 6(1).)
- Act of Parliament
- Parliament of the United Kingdom
- Long title: An Act to amend the law relating to the distribution of the estates of deceased persons and to make provision about the effect of the dissolution or annulment of marriages on wills and appointments of guardians.
- Citation: 1995 c. 41
- Territorial extent: England and Wales (Note: Section 6(2).)

Dates
- Royal assent: 8 November 1995
- Commencement: 8 November 1995 (Note: Section 4(b) of the Interpretation Act 1978.)
Other legislation
Amends	Wills Act 1837; Administration of Estates Act 1925; Inheritance (Provision for Family and Dependants) Act 1975; Children Act 1989; See § Repealed enactments

Status: Current legislation

Text of statute as originally enacted

Revised text of statute as amended

Text of the Law Reform (Succession) Act 1995 as in force today (including any amendments) within the United Kingdom, from legislation.gov.uk.

The Law Reform (Succession) Act 1995 (c. 41) is an act of the Parliament of the United Kingdom that amended the law relating to the distribution of the estates of deceased persons and made provision about the effect of the dissolution or annulment of marriages on wills and appointments of guardians in England and Wales.

== Provisions ==
=== Repealed enactments ===
Section 5 of the act repealed 3 enactments, listed in the schedule to the act.

Citation	Short title	Extent of repeal
7 Will. 4 & 1 Vict. c. 26	Wills Act 1837	Section 18A(3).
15 & 16 Geo. 5. c. 23	Administration of Estates Act 1925	Section 47(1)(iii).
15 & 16 Geo. 5. c. 23	Administration of Estates Act 1925	In section 49, in subsection (1) paragraphs (aa) and (a), and subsections (2) and (3).
15 & 16 Geo. 6 & 1 Eliz. 2. c. 64	Intestates' Estates Act 1952	Section 3(2).
