= Per capita =

Latin phrase; "by heads"/"for each head"

Agricultural land use per capita, 1961-2018

Per capita is a Latin phrase literally meaning "by heads" or "for each head", and idiomatically used to mean "per person".

== Social statistics ==
The term is used in a wide variety of social sciences and statistical research contexts, including government statistics, economic indicators, and built environment studies.

It is commonly used in the field of statistics in place of saying "per person" (although per caput is the Latin for "per head").

It is also used in wills to indicate that each of the named beneficiaries should receive, by bequest or devise, equal shares of the estate. This is in contrast to a per stirpes division, in which each branch (Latin: stirps, pl.: stirpes) of the inheriting family inherits an equal share of the estate. This is often used with the '2-0 rule', a statistical principle that determines which group is larger per capita. Under the 2-0 rule, a group is the largest per capita if it has both the biggest total size and size of the group of the objects in question, therefore resulting in a 2-0 score.

== See also ==
- List of countries by GDP (nominal) per capita
- List of countries by GNI (nominal) per capita
