= Wills Act 1963 =

Act of the Parliament of the United Kingdom

Wills Act 1963 (Note: Section 7(1).)
- Act of Parliament
- Parliament of the United Kingdom
- Long title: An Act to repeal the Wills Act 1861 and make new provision in lieu thereof; and to provide that certain testamentary instruments shall be probative for the purpose of the conveyance of heritable property in Scotland.
- Citation: 1963 c. 44
- Territorial extent: England and Wales; Scotland; Northern Ireland; (Note: Section 7(5).)

Dates
- Royal assent: 31 July 1963
- Commencement: 1 January 1964 (Note: Section 7(2).)

Other legislation
- Repeals/revokes: Wills Act 1861
- Amended by: Succession (Scotland) Act 1964; Northern Ireland Constitution Act 1973
- Relates to: Wills Act 1837

Status: Amended

Text of statute as originally enacted

Revised text of statute as amended

Text of the Wills Act 1963 as in force today (including any amendments) within the United Kingdom, from legislation.gov.uk.

The Wills Act 1963 (c. 44) is an act of the Parliament of the United Kingdom that repealed the Wills Act 1861 (24 & 25 Vict. c. 114) and brought United Kingdom law in line with the suggestions of the Ninth Hague Conference on Private International Law, completed on 5 October 1961. Along with the Wills Act 1837 (7 Will. 4 & 1 Vict. c. 26), the 1963 act is the principal act dealing with wills in the United Kingdom. The act allows a will to be considered "properly executed" if it was executed in line with local law in the state where it was executed, the state where the testator lived or the state the testator was a citizen of, rather than applying United Kingdom law to all wills.

== Background ==
The Wills Act 1861 (24 & 25 Vict. c. 114), known as Lord Kingsdown's Act, was a frequently used example of the conflict between various national laws because of the different standards it set between subjects and wills from the United Kingdom and from other nations. In addition it failed to distinguish between movable and immovable property, and immovable property had to be compatible with the law of the state it was in, with no consideration for the nationality of the testator or any other factors.

The meeting of the produced a Draft Convention on the Formal Validity of Wills, and combined with the Fourth Report of the Lord Chancellor's Private International Law Committee this provided enough incentive for the government to introduce a bill repealing the 1861 act and replacing it with something that meshed with the law of other states. The bill was introduced to the House of Commons on 21 November 1962, given its second reading on 22 February 1963, and received royal assent on 31 July 1963.

== Provisions ==
The act is divided into seven sections. Section 1 of the act allows a will to be considered "properly executed" if it was executed in line with the laws in the state where it was executed, the state the testator lived in up to his death or the state the testator was a citizen of. This gets rid of the problem with the 1861 Act which meant that wills could be declared formally invalid if not executed in a very narrow way - wills of British citizens had to be executed in line with British law, regardless of where the citizen lived. It has been suggested that "will" should include similar things in nations with different types of inheritance, such as the "contracts of inheritance" in German and Swiss law. Section 1 deliberately makes no distinction between wills of real property and wills of personal property.

Section 2 of the act allows a will to be considered executed if it is executed on board an aircraft or ship in a fashion which follows the law of the state in which the aircraft is registered. If a will disposes of real property it is considered executed if it conforms to the law in the state the property was in, and a will overturning a previous will is considered executed if its purpose is to overturn a previous will valid under the act, or terms of a previous will which would not be considered valid under the act. A will to appoint executors is considered similarly executed.

Section 3 of the act takes into account the laws of other states on the make-up of a will, and says that the way a will is constructed does not have to be changed if the testator moves state after the will is executed. Section 5 took into account the Scottish system of property transfer, but was repealed by the Succession (Scotland) Act 1964. Sections 6 and 7 are procedural ones, which define certain terms and indicate that the act comes into force on 1 January 1964.

== See also ==
- Wills Act

== Bibliography ==
Primary sources

- "Wills Act 1963 (c.44) - Statute Law Database". UK Statute Law Database.

Secondary sources

- F, O.K. (January 1964). "Wills Act 1963". Modern Law Review. 27 (1). Blackwell Publishing.
- Morris, J. H. C. (April 1964). "The Wills Act, 1963". The International and Comparative Law Quarterly. 13 (2). Cambridge University Press.
