= Forced heirship =

Form of testate partible inheritance

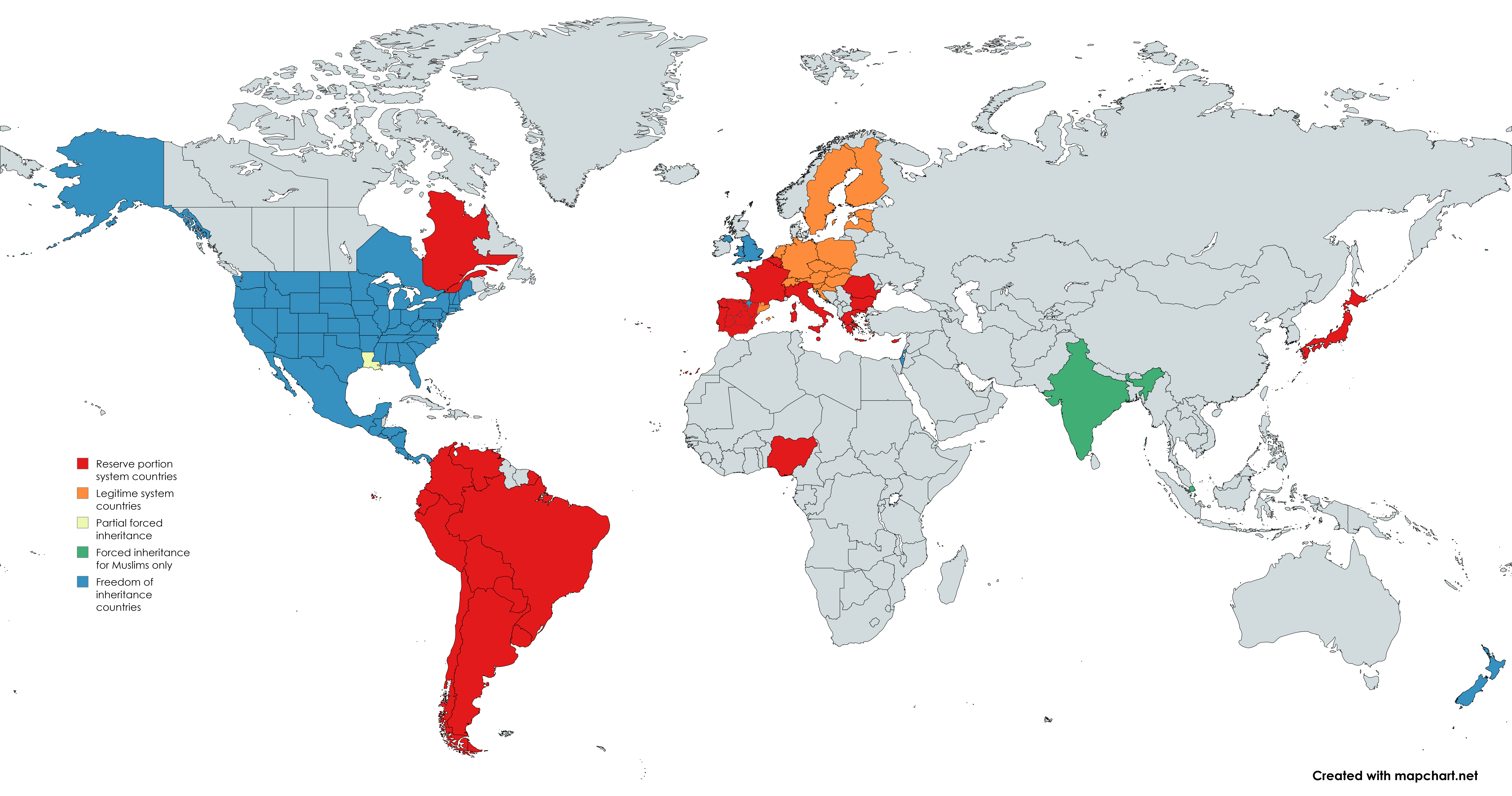
Forced heirship rules by country

Forced heirship is a form of testate partible inheritance which mandates how the deceased's estate is to be disposed and which tends to guarantee an inheritance for family of the deceased.

In forced heirship, the estate of a deceased (de cujus) is separated into two portions.

1. An indefeasible portion, the forced estate, (Note: (German: Pflichtteil, Fr réserve, It, legittima, Sp and Pt legítima)) passing to the deceased's next-of-kin (Note: Persons closely related to the deceased, namely parents, spouse, or children.) (conjunctissimi).
2. A discretionary portion, or free estate, (Note: (German: frei verfügbare Quote, Fr quotité disponible, It quota disponible, Sp tercio de libre disposición, Pt quota disponível)) to be freely disposed of by will.

Forced heirship is generally a feature of civil-law legal systems which do not recognize total freedom of testation, in contrast with common law jurisdictions.

Normally in forced heirship, the deceased's estate is in-gathered and wound up without discharging liabilities, which means accepting inheritance includes accepting the liabilities attached to inherited property. The forced estate is divided into shares which include the share of issue (legitime or child's share) and the spousal share. This provides a minimum protection that cannot be defeated by will. The free estate, on the other hand, is at the discretion of a testator to be distributed by will on death to whomever he or she chooses. Takers in the forced estate are known as forced heirs. (Note: (German: Pflichtteilserben, Noterben, French: héritiers réservataires, Italian: legittimari, Spanish: herederos forzosos, Portuguese: herdeiros legitimários))

The expression comes from Louisianan legal language and is ultimately a calque of Spanish sucesión forzosa.

== Overview ==
Forced heirship laws are prevalent among civil law jurisdictions; these include major countries such as Brazil, France, Germany, Italy, Spain, Switzerland, and Japan. Reckoning shares in instances of multiple or no children and lack of surviving spouse vary from country to country. In Germany, for example, a forced heir receives at least half of what they would have received in the absence of a testament.

In Islamic law, as practiced for example in Saudi Arabia, forced heirship is the rule and testaments are fairly rare. A testator may distribute at most a third of their legacy and only to persons outside the circle of regular heirs (meaning for example that one son can never inherit more than another).

Advocates of forced heirship contend that it is perfectly proper for testators to be required to make adequate provision for their dependants, and that most countries in the world permit wills to be varied where they would leave dependants destitute. Critics suggest that there is a great difference between varying wills to the minimum degree to provide sufficient financial support for dependants, and prohibiting the testator from distributing the estate or a proportion of the estate to any female children, or younger male children, and that it cannot be any less repugnant to force a deceased person to distribute their assets in a certain manner on their death than it would be to tell them how they may do so during their lifetime.

In Poland, the corresponding institution, known as zachowek, generally gives eligible descendants, spouses and parents a monetary claim rather than an automatic ownership share in the estate. Under Article 991 of the Polish Civil Code, the claim normally amounts to one-half of the beneficiary's statutory inheritance share, increased to two-thirds for minors or persons permanently unable to work.

== History ==
The institution began as a Germanic custom for intestate inheritance (which was the norm) under which all of a deceased's personal property was divided into thirds—the widow's part, bairns' part, and dead's part (Note: Scots law terms. Also known as the customary share, orphanage share, and dead man's share in the custom of London, or alternatively as the customary share, portion natural, and legatory share in the custom of York.)—the last of which, consisting of clothes, weapons, farm animals and implements, was usually buried with the deceased. With the adoption of Christian funerary practices, it became common to gift away the dead's part, and after the revival of the will, and consequently of testation, the dead's part came to be freely disposable.

Realty, or heritable property, on the other hand, was originally inherited in joint tenancy, termed gavelkind, and passed on to the kin group as a whole. However, after the household superseded the kin group in importance in the late Middle Ages, preference was given to the deceased's immediate family, specifically any surviving sons, and none could be favored over his siblings. However, gavelkind inheritance gave rise to inter-family rivalries, so primogeniture laws arose in some areas of feudal Europe giving preference to the eldest son in order to stem feuding. Nevertheless, under medieval communal society, family land could not be sold except for cause, and the family essentially had a right of first refusal (laudatio parentum) in any such sale; in some places, this restriction also applied to gifts.

The family was so favored that in order to keep property within the same family, women—who on marriage in effect joined another family—were accorded very few property rights. Therefore, widows were universally disinherited, though they were varyingly entitled to a dower and/or a terce (or curtesy in the case of widowers), that is, one third of the heritable marital estate. The terce was earliest known as tertia collaborationis and first appears in the Ripuarian law code, making it also a localized Germanic custom. In the customs of York and London, for example, a widow was entitled both to her widow's part (customary share) and terce (widow's chamber), the last of which was half—not a third—of the marital estate.

Eventually, these elements were all consolidated into the modern form of forced heirship most notably in Revolutionary France, which treated personalty and realty in the same way and applied gavelkind inheritance and the system of thirds to both forms of property. After abandoning dowries and dowers in the 20th century, many European countries created or increased the spousal share to be on par with the share of issue (legitime); Spain is an exception.

== Louisiana ==
In Louisiana, Civil Code article 1493 stipulates that "Forced heirs are descendants of the first degree who, at the time of the death of the decedent, are twenty-three years of age or younger or descendants of the first degree of any age who, because of mental incapacity or physical infirmity, are permanently incapable of taking care of their persons or administering their estates at the time of the death of the decedent". If they are not disinherited (LCC art. 1494) they qualify as forced heirs. The disinherison must be made expressly and for one of eight just causes; otherwise, it is null (LCC art. 1621). The legitime is equal to 25% of the patrimony (if one forced heir); or 50% (if more than one); and each forced heir will receive the lesser of an equal proportion of the legitime or what they would have received through intestacy (LCC art. 1495, Succession of Greenlaw). If a person who would have otherwise qualified as a forced heir dies before the parent, rights to that share may pass to that person's children, although how that share is distributed among them if one or more is an interdict remains unsettled law. Forced heirs may demand collation, whereby certain gifts received by any successor in the three years before the death of the parent may be subtracted from their share. In 1991 Louisiana abolished the forced heirship provision for spouses; however, at death the spouse's interest in any community property is converted to his or her separate property; and a usufruct is granted over the remaining community (with the forced heirs as naked owners of their respective shares). That usufruct terminates at death or remarriage.

Wealthy individuals in the U.S. sometimes seek to circumvent forced heirship laws by transferring assets into an offshore company and seeking to settle the shares in the offshore company in a trust governed by the laws of a jurisdiction outside their domicile.

Succession of Lauga (1993) 624 So.2d 1156 say Art 1493 is unconstitutional so the 23 year age limit does not apply. The Louisiana Constitution was subsequently amended to overcome the Lauga decision.

== See also ==
- Legitime
