= Will contract =

A will contract is a term used in the law of wills describing a contract to exchange a current performance for a future bequest. In such an agreement, one party (the promisee) will provide some performance in exchange for a promise by the other party (the testator, because they must draft a will) to make a specific bequest to the promisee party in the testator's will. Most jurisdictions recognize such contracts as valid, although a few hold them as void against public policy. Some jurisdictions will not recognize an oral contract for such a purpose, requiring instead that the contract be executed in writing and signed by both parties. Some jurisdictions require full compliance with the Statute of Wills to be effective, i.e., in writing and signed in the presence of two witnesses.

The general rule, where such contracts are recognized, is that the promisee can not specifically enforce the contract if the testator later revokes or supersedes the will making the promised bequest, but can only sue the testator's estate for breach of contract. This protects the testator's very strong freedom to dispose of his property however he sees fit. For example, suppose Joey agrees to execute a will bequeathing his house to Rachel in exchange for services provided by Rachel. If Joey later revokes that will, Rachel can not force Joey's estate to convey the house to her, but can only sue for the value of the house.

Typically, will contracts are made between people who have different heirs to whom they wish to leave their property at death, but they may wish for the other person to have the use of until all of their combined assets until the death of the second to die. A married couple with children from an earlier marriage is a good example. The husband may leave his separate estate to his wife at his death, instead of directly to his children from his earlier marriage and in exchange, she may agree to combine his separate estate with her separate estate at her death and split the combined estate up between all of their children. It would work the same if she died first. A will contract only becomes irrevocable only at the first party's death. Because of differences in state laws regarding will contracts, an estate planning attorney should be consulted before use of this planning device.

The law behind wills becomes tedious when many parties are not present, typically in cases with limited family members. This mainly occurred after World War Two where many wills had no possible recipients so the assets went to the government. Wills are often confused with trust funds, but wills are only present at death whereas trust funds can be accessed during the time that the creator of the fund is still alive.
