= Per stirpes =

Legal term pertaining to inheritance

Per stirpes (/pɜːr ˈstɜːrpiːz/; "by roots" or "by stock") (Note: Historically, the Wills Act 1837 in England and Wales described this concept with the language according to their stock.) is a legal term from Latin, used in the law of inheritance and estates. An estate of a decedent is distributed per stirpes if each branch of the family is to receive an equal share of an estate in accordance with their deceased ancestor's share. When an heir in the first generation of a branch predeceased the decedent, the share that would have been given to that heir would be distributed among that heir's issue in equal shares.

Historically, per stirpes distribution occurred at the level of the generation closest to the deceased person, whether or not there were surviving heirs within that generation. That could result in an uneven distribution of an inheritance. For example, if two first cousins represent the first generation, one having three children and the other having one child, and they are deceased at the time of the distribution, the children of the first cousin would each receive one sixth of the inheritance (one third of their deceased parent's half) while the child of the other cousin would receive half. The modern approach looks instead to the first generation with surviving heirs, which would mean that all four surviving children would each receive one quarter of the inheritance, a per capita distribution. The historic rule, where members of the same generation may inherit different amounts, is now often described as strict per stirpes, or the old English approach.

== Examples ==
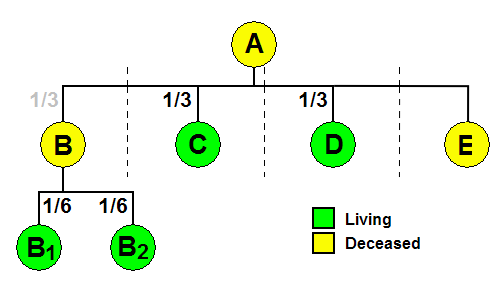
Figure 1. A's estate is divided equally between each of the three branches. B, C, and D each receive one-third. As B pre-deceased A, B's two children – B1 and B2 – each receive one-half of B's share, equivalent to one-sixth of the estate. E is pre-deceased with no descendants to receive a share of the estate.

Example 1A: The testator A, specifies in their will that their estate is to be divided among their descendants in equal shares per stirpes. A has three children: B, C, and D. B is already dead, but has left two children (grandchildren of A), B1 and B2. When A's will is executed, under a distribution per stirpes, C and D each receive one-third of the estate, and B1 and B2 each receive one-sixth. B1 and B2 constitute one "branch" of the family, and collectively receive a share equal to the shares received by C and D as branches (figure 1).

Example 1B: If grandchild B1 had predeceased A, leaving two children B1a and B1b, and grandchild B2 had also died leaving three children B2a, B2b, and B2c, then distribution per stirpes would give one-third each to C and D; one-twelfth each to B1a and B1b, who would constitute a branch; and one-eighteenth each to B2a, B2b, and B2c. Thus, the B, C, and D branches receive equal shares of the whole estate, the B1 and B2 branches receive equal shares of the B branch's share, B1a and B1b receive equal shares of the B1 branch's share, and B2a, B2b, and B2c receive equal shares of the B2 branch's share.

== Per capita at each generation ==
Per capita at each generation is an alternative way of distribution, where heirs of the same generation will each receive the same amount. The estate is divided into equal shares at the generation closest to the deceased with surviving heirs. The number of shares is equal to the number of original members either surviving or with surviving descendants. Each surviving heir of that generation gets a share. The remainder is then equally divided among the next-generation descendants of the deceased descendants in the same manner. This is the approach proposed by the American 1990 Uniform Probate Code.

Example 2A: In the first example, children C and D survive, so the estate is divided at their generation. There were three children, so each surviving child receives one-third. The remainder – B's share – is then divided in the same manner among B's surviving descendants. The result is the same as under per stirpes because B's one-third is distributed to B1 and B2 (one-sixth to each).

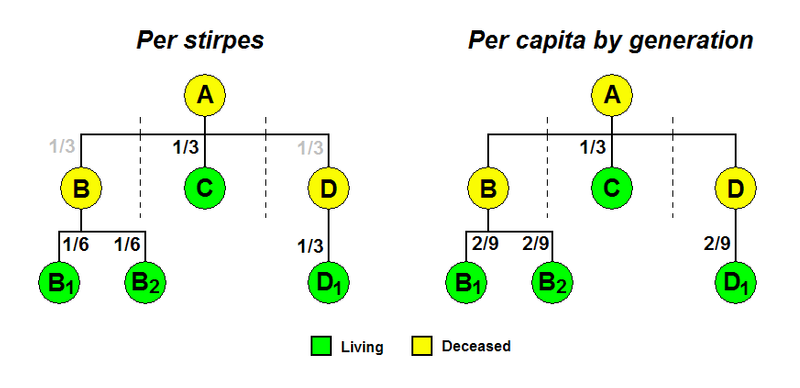
Figure 2. Comparison between per stirpes inheritance and per capita by generation inheritance. On the left, each branch receives one third of the estate. On the right, A's only surviving child, C, receives one third of the estate. The remaining two thirds are divided among the descendants in the next generation.

Example 2B: The per capita and per stirpes results would differ if D also pre-deceased with one child, D1 (figure 2). Under per stirpes, B1 and B2 would each receive one-sixth (half of B's one-third share), and D1 would receive one-third (all of D's one-third share). Under per capita, the two-thirds remaining after C's one-third share was taken would be divided equally among all three children of B and D. (Two-thirds = six-ninths) Each would receive two-ninths: B1, B2, and D1 would all receive two-ninths.

Notes:

- To give the effect indicated in these examples the clause should also include a provision that no beneficiary being a grandchild or more remote descendant will take a share if his or her parent is alive and takes a share.
- The spouses of the children (that is, spouses of B, C, and D) are not considered. Spouses are not a part of the branch. Therefore, even if B, C, or, D died leaving a spouse as well as children, all (100%) of the assets pass to the children and (0%) nothing passes to the spouses of A's children B, C, and D. From the example above, if A's child B died before A's death, A's grandchildren B1 and B2 would each receive half of B's share. Even if B had a living spouse at the time of A's death, that person would receive nothing from A's estate.

== Per capita with representation ==
In many US states, a statute has modified the per stirpes approach and uses instead a per capita with representation approach (also known as modern American per stirpes). Under this approach, the number of branches is determined by reference to the generation nearest the testator which has a surviving descendant. Thus, in the first example, if C and D also are already dead, and each left one child, C1 and D1 respectively, then each of B1, B2, C1 and D1 would receive one quarter of the estate. This method is used in the states of Alaska, Arizona, California, Colorado, Hawaii, Maine, Michigan, New Jersey, New Mexico, New York, Ohio, Oklahoma, Pennsylvania, Utah, and West Virginia.

Summary of distribution of issue
	Per stirpes	Per capita with representation	Per capita at each generation
Where is the estate divided first?	First generation always	First generation live taker	
How many shares is the estate divided into at that generation?	One share each party alive; one share each party dead but survived by issue		
How to treat dropping shares?	Drop by bloodline		Drop by pooling

== See also ==
- Stirpes
