= Legitime =

Inheritance law

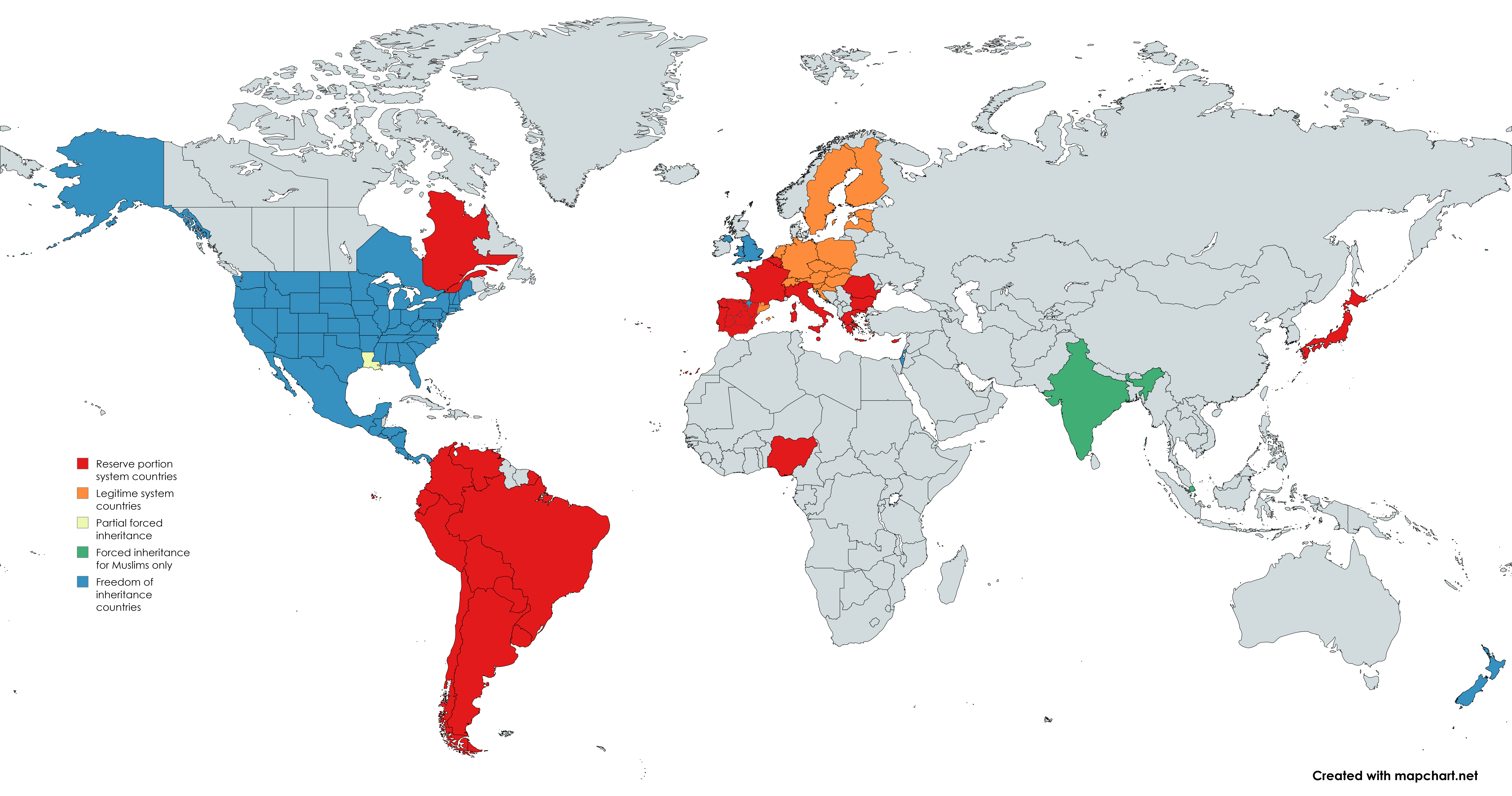
Forced heirship rules by country

In civil law and Roman law, the legitime (legitima portio), also known as a forced share or legal right share, of a decedent's estate is that portion of the estate from which they cannot disinherit their children, or their parents, without sufficient legal cause. The word comes from French héritier légitime, meaning "rightful heir." Scholars have noted that the concept was probably borrowed by the Romans from Greek law.

The legitime is usually a statutory fraction of the decedent's gross estate and passes as joint property to the decedent's next-of-kin in equal undivided shares. The legitime cannot be infringed in order to give a spouse or other beneficiary a greater share of the estate. Therefore, when a decedent has children and leaves a will, it is unlawful for the testator to override the legitime by special gift which exhausts the estate or by designating his spouse or other person as sole beneficiary. This is known as preterition when arising by omission and disinheritance when heirs are expressly deprived.

== English common law ==
In English common law, there is no legitime; the Statute of Wills (32 Hen. 8. c. 1), provided for the unfettered distribution of a decedent's entire estate; a testator is entitled to disinherit any and all of their children, for any reason and for no reason. However, the concept of legitime was recognized in England till the 13th Century. Most jurisdictions in the United States have enacted statutes that prohibit a testator from disinheriting a spouse, or provided that in the event of such a will the spouse may elect to "take against the will" and claim a statutory share of a decedent's estate. This is done as a substitute for the common law rights of dower and curtesy.

It is generally not possible to disinherit a minor dependent child.

== In certain jurisdictions ==
=== Brazil ===
In Brazil, it is mandatory that half of the testator's assets be distributed to necessary heirs.

=== Czech Republic ===
In the Czech Republic, the nearest descendants can require 1/4 of their intestacy portion if they are of age or 3/4 of their intestacy portion if they are under age. (If a child of the deceased died before him, their children can claim forced share instead from them, etc.)

=== Greece ===
In Greece, the descendants and the spouse must receive at least 50% of the share that they would have received if the decedent died intestate, that is half of what they would receive under default rules.

=== India ===
In India, the concept of legitime applies only to Muslims. Muslim men cannot give away more than one-third of their property by will.

=== Louisiana ===
In Louisiana, until the passage of Act No. 788 of 1989, the situation was different. Formerly, in Louisiana, the legitime operated to prevent parents from wholly disinheriting their children, who were and are still called forced heirs. If the decedent left issue in the form of one child, that issue must receive at least 25% of the decedent's estate. If there were two or more children, they must receive at least 50% of it among themselves. Similar provisions prevented a decedent with living parents from disinheriting them.

Post-1989 Louisiana law provides for a forced share only if the decedent's children are under 24 years of age, or are permanently unable to take care of themselves, referred to as interdicted or subject to interdiction. Otherwise, a decedent's issue may be wholly disinherited. This change is essentially the importation of the common law doctrine of freedom of testation, but stops short of fully abolishing forced heirship because that is expressly forbidden by Louisiana Constitution Article XII, Section 5.

=== Scotland ===
In Scotland, legitim is the right of the issue (including adult issue) to not less than a defined share of the value of the moveable estate of the deceased. The share is one half, if the deceased left no relict (widow or widower), or one third if there was a relict. For example, if a testator has two children, and no spouse, and in their testament leaves everything to one of them, the other would be entitled to half of the legitim fund, which means a half of a half of the total net value of the moveable estate. (Or half of a third if there were a spouse.) Legitim is also called the bairn's pairt or part of gear (Scots: bairn "child").

=== Philippines ===
Under the Civil Code of the Philippines, the legitime is given to and/or shared by the compulsory heirs of the decedent. This is also called compulsory succession because the law has reserved it for the compulsory heirs and thus, the testator has no power to give it away to anyone of his liking. The compulsory heirs include the children, or descendants (this class includes the adopted children and legitimated children), legitimate or illegitimate; in their default, the legitimate parents, or legitimate ascendants; the surviving spouse, which concurs with the foregoing classes; and the illegitimate parents.

Thus, legitimate children always get one half of the estate, divided equally between them. The surviving spouse gets a share equal to that of a legitimate child, except when there is only one legitimate child, in which case the spouse gets one fourth of the estate. Illegitimate children get one half of the share given to legitimate children.

The legitimate parents or ascendants are excluded by legitimate children or descendants, but not by illegitimate children, and get one half of the estate in such cases. The surviving spouse or illegitimate children, when either concur with the parents or ascendants, get one fourth of the estate. If all concur, the share of the surviving spouse is reduced to one eighth of the estate.

The surviving spouse gets one half of the estate when there are no other heirs, and in certain cases, when the marriage is in articulo mortis, they get one third. The surviving spouse also gets one third of the estate when concurring with illegitimate children, who also get the same share. However, the surviving spouse gets one fourth when concurring with illegitimate parents, who also get one fourth of the estate.

The illegitimate children, in default of everyone, get one half of the estate. The illegitimate parents, who are excluded by everyone except the surviving spouse, also get one half in default of everyone.
