= Wills Act 1837 =

Act of the Parliament of the United Kingdom

Wills Act 1837 (Note: The citation of this act by this short title was authorised by section 1 of, and the first schedule to, the Short Titles Act 1896. Due to the repeal of those provisions it is now authorised by section 19(2) of the Interpretation Act 1978.)
- Act of Parliament
- Parliament of the United Kingdom
- Long title: An Act for the Amendment of the Laws with respect to Wills.
- Citation: 7 Will. 4 & 1 Vict. c. 26
- Introduced by: Attorney General Sir John Campbell
- Territorial extent: England and Wales; Ireland; (Note: Section 35.)

Dates
- Royal assent: 3 July 1837
- Commencement: 1 January 1838 (Note: Section 34.)
- Repealed: New Zealand: 28 August 2007
Other legislation
Amends	Statute of Frauds
Repeals/revokes	Wills Act 1540; Wills Act 1542; Wills Act 1751; Disposition of Copyhold Estates by Will Act 1815
Amended by	Admiralty, &c. Acts Repeal Act 1865; Statute Law Revision Act 1874; Married Women's Property Act 1893; Law of Property Act 1922; Family Law Reform Act 1969; Statute Law (Repeals) Act 1969; Administration of Justice Act 1982; Family Law Act 1986; Law Reform (Succession) Act 1995; Trusts of Land and Appointment of Trustees Act 1996; Human Tissue Act 2004
Repealed by	New Zealand: Wills Act 2007
Relates to	Statute of Wills; Statute of Frauds; Wills Act 1861; Wills (Soldiers and Sailors) Act 1918; Wills Act 1963

Status: Amended

Text of statute as originally enacted

Text of the Wills Act 1837 as in force today (including any amendments) within the United Kingdom, from legislation.gov.uk.

The Wills Act 1837 (7 Will. 4 & 1 Vict. c. 26) is an act of the Parliament of the United Kingdom that confirms the power of every adult to dispose of their real and personal property, whether they are the outright owner or a beneficiary under a trust, by will on their death (s.3). The act extends to all testamentary dispositions or gifts, where "a person makes a disposition of his property to take effect after his decease, and which is in its own nature ambulatory and revocable during his life." As of 2012, much of it remains in force in England and Wales.

== Background ==
Under ecclesiastical law, common law and equity, various customary rules had long existed for disposing of personal property by will. However, the power to gift real property by will had been first granted by the Statute of Wills (32 Hen. 8. c. 1). Various rules grew up around the formalities necessary to create a valid will and the Statute of Frauds (29 Cha. 2. c. 3) created the requirement that a will of real property must be in writing. By the early nineteenth century, the rules had become complex, with different rules for formalising wills of real and personal property. The 4th report of the Commissioners for Inquiring into the Law of Real Property recommended a simplified and unified scheme. As the Commissioners observed "Any scrap of paper, or memorandum in ink or in pencil, mentioning an intended disposition of his property, is admitted as a will and will be valid, although written by another person, and not read over to the testator, or even seen by him, if proved to be made in his lifetime according to his instructions." A bill was introduced by the Attorney General Sir John Campbell, one of the Commissioners, in 1834 though it was much delayed for want of parliamentary time. The bill was introduced in the House of Lords by Lord Langdale.

Though the requirement that a will be in writing stems from an attempt to frustrate fraud, an apparent exception to the requirements for the formal execution of the Act under section 9 is a secret trust.

== Provisions of the act currently in force ==
=== Capacity ===
The general age to write a will aligns with the age of majority, in any case, a person aged 16 or over may write a will if they are a member of the armed forces on active service or a mariner at sea (s.11). These provisions were clarified by the Wills (Soldiers and Sailors) Act 1918 (7 & 8 Geo. 5. c. 58) (see below).

=== Requirements of a valid will ===
A will is only valid if (s.9):

- It is made in writing;
- It is signed by the testator, or at his direction and in his presence;
- The testator intends that the signature give effect to the will;
- The will is made or acknowledged in the presence of two or more witnesses, present at the same time; and
- Each witness attests and signs, or acknowledges, his signature in the presence of the testator.

There is no requirement to publish a will (s.13). If any of the witnesses was, or subsequently becomes, incapable of proving the will, that alone will not make it invalid (s.14). Alterations must be executed in the same manner as a will (s.21).

Prior to 1982, the witnesses were required to "subscribe" rather than "sign" the will , and standard forms existed that did not include space for witnesses' signatures. In Payne vs Payne [2018] EWCA Civ 985, Lord Justice Henderson ruled that despite the change of wording, it was still sufficient for a witness to write their name with the intention of attesting the will, rather than a literal signature being required.

=== Revocation of a will ===
Section 18 of the act revokes the will in the event of the marriage of the testator. However, this section was amended in 1982 so that where the testator makes the will in the expectation of marriage to a particular person, the will is not revoked by such a marriage. Section 18A was added in 1982 to the effect that divorce and annulment have the same effect as the death of a spouse.

A will or codicil cannot be revoked by any presumption of the intention of the testator or on the grounds of any alteration in his circumstances (s.19). A will can only be revoked by (s.20):

- Another properly executed will or codicil;
- A document executed under the same formalities as a will, declaring an intention to revoke the will; or
- Destruction of the will by the testator, or some person in his presence, with the intention of revoking the will.

A revoked will or codicil cannot be revived other than by its re-execution or by a formally executed codicil (s.22).

=== Gifts to witnesses ===
Gifts under the will to an attesting witness, or their spouse, are null and void. However, such a witness can still prove the will (s.15). There is no bar on a creditor of the testator or the executor of the will being a witness (ss.16–17).

=== Gifts to children ===
Where the testator makes a gift to one of his children or a remoter descendant, and that child dies before the testator, the gift will not lapse so long as the deceased descendant himself leaves children surviving at the death of the testator. The surviving descendants receive the gift (s.33) "according to their stock", i.e. per stirpes. The rule also applies to illegitimate children (s.33(4)(a)) and a person conceived before the death of the testator is deemed to have been living at the testator's death (s.33(4)(b)).

== Interpretation ==
The will is interpreted in respect of the testator's property immediately before his death (s.24). Where the testator makes a gift of all his real property, it is deemed to include property over which he has a power of appointment (s.27).

== Ireland and Northern Ireland ==
The act was in force in Ireland until partition. It consequently became the law of the Irish Free State on 6 December 1922, and then of its successor states. When Ireland was partitioned and the statelet of Northern Ireland created on 7 December 1922, the Act became the law of Northern Ireland. However, all save sections 1 and 11 were repealed and re-enacted, with amendments, in Northern Ireland in 1995 following the recommendations of the Land Law Working Group.

== Provisions repealed by the act ==
- Statute of Wills

== Provisions of the act, since repealed ==
Sections 4 to 6 addressed various technicalities of land law since rendered obsolete. The Act did not extend to estates pur autre vie and various manorial rights were preserved over the land devised. Where land was held subject to a Lord of the manor, for example under a copyhold, the Act required that the will was recorded in the Court Roll of the manor and that various fees and duties were paid. These provisions became irrelevant following the demise of the manorial system with the Law of Property Act 1925.

Section 8 maintained the earlier incapacity of a feme covert to make a will. This was reformed in the late 19th century and formally repealed in 1969.

== Wills (Soldiers and Sailors) Act 1918 ==
Wills (Soldiers and Sailors) Act 1918 (Note: Section 5(1).)
- Act of Parliament
- Parliament of the United Kingdom
- Long title: An Act to amend the Law with respect to Testamentary Dispositions by Soldiers and Sailors.
- Citation: 7 & 8 Geo. 5. c. 58
- Territorial extent: United Kingdom

Dates
- Royal assent: 6 February 1918
- Commencement: 6 February 1918 (Note: The Acts of Parliament (Commencement) Act 1793.)
Other legislation
Amended by	Succession (Scotland) Act 1964; Family Law Reform Act 1969
Relates to	Wills Act 1837

Status: Amended

Text of statute as originally enacted

Text of the Wills (Soldiers and Sailors) Act 1918 as in force today (including any amendments) within the United Kingdom, from legislation.gov.uk.

The Wills (Soldiers and Sailors) Act 1918 (7 & 8 Geo. 5. c. 58) clarifies and extends the Wills Act 1837. Section 1 makes if clear that a soldier on active service or sailor at sea, can make, and always could have made, a valid will, even though under 18 years of age. Section 2 extends the provision to sailors not at sea but who are employed in similar service to a soldier on active service. "Soldier" include a member of the Air Force (s.5). This act is in force in Scotland, but this may be to no effect as it acts only by reference to the Wills Act 1837, which is not in effect there; the Wills Act 1837 is in effect, in modified form, in Northern Ireland.

== Subsequent developments ==
The following provisions were repealed by section 1 of, and part III of the schedule to, the Statute Law (Repeals) Act 1969, which came into force on 1 January 1970.

- In section 1, in the definition of " will " the words from " by virtue of an Act", where first occurring to " knights service" where last occurring; and in the definition of " real estate " the words from " whether freehold" to " tenure, and ".
- In section 3 the words from " upon the heir" to "ancestor or"; and the words from " to all real estate " to " hereditament; and also ". Sections 4 to 6. Section 8. In section 26 the words " customary, copyhold or " and the words " customary, copyhold and" in both places.

== See also ==
- Wills Act

== Bibliography ==
- Critchley, P. (1999). "Instruments of fraud, testamentary dispositions, and the doctrine of secret trusts". Law Quarterly Review. 115: 631–654.
- Jarman, T. (1844). A Treatise on Wills. London: Sweet – via Internet Archive.
- Jarman, T. (1951). Jennings, R. (ed.). A Treatise on Wills. Vol. I (8th ed.). London: Sweet & Maxwell. p. 26.
- Mirow, M. C. (1994). "Last wills and testaments in England 1500–1800". In Vanderlinden, J. (ed.). Actes à cause de mort [Acts of last will]. Brussels: De Boeck Université. pp. 47–84. ISBN 2-8041-1561-5.
- Wilde, D. (1995). "Secret and semi-secret trusts: justifying distinctions between the two". Conveyancer and Property Lawyer (Sep–Oct): 366–378.
