= Statute of Wills =

Act of the Parliament of England

- Act of Parliament
- Parliament of England
- Long title: The Act of Wills, Wards, and Primer Seisins, whereby a Man may devise Two Parts of his Land.
- Citation: 32 Hen. 8. c. 1
- Territorial extent: England and Wales

Dates
- Royal assent: 24 July 1540
- Commencement: 12 April 1540 (Note: Start of session.)
- Repealed: 1 January 1838
Other legislation
Amended by	Wills Act 1542
Repealed by	Wills Act 1837
Relates to	Statute of Uses

Status: Repealed

Text of statute as originally enacted

The Statute of Wills or Wills Act 1540 (32 Hen. 8. c. 1) was an act of the Parliament of England. The act made it possible, for the first time in post-Conquest English history, for landholders to determine who would inherit their land upon their death by permitting devise by will. Prior to the enactment of this statute, land could be passed by descent only if and when the landholder had competent living relatives who survived him, and it was subject to the rules of primogeniture. When a landholder died without any living relatives, his land would escheat to the Crown. The statute was something of a political compromise between Henry VIII and English landowners, who were growing increasingly frustrated with primogeniture and royal control of land.

== Subsequent developments ==
The whole act was repealed by section 2 of the Wills Act 1837 (7 Will. 4 & 1 Vict. c. 26), which superseded the act.

The Statute of Wills created a number of requirements for the form of a will, many of which, as of 2023, survive in common law jurisdictions. Specifically, most jurisdictions still require that a will must be in writing, signed by the testator (the person making the will) and witnessed by at least two other persons. The Uniform Probate Code in the United States carries forward the two witness requirement of the Statute of Wills, at Section 2-502, except that a document is valid as a holographic will, whether or not witnessed, if the signature and material portions of the document are in the testator's handwriting.

== Bibliography ==
- Dukeminier, Jesse and Krier, James E. Property, Fifth Edition, pp. 284, 637. Aspen Publishers, 2002. ISBN 0-7355-2437-8

== See also ==
- Statute of Uses
- Cestui que
- Legal history of wills
