= Inheritance =

Practice of passing on property upon the death of individuals

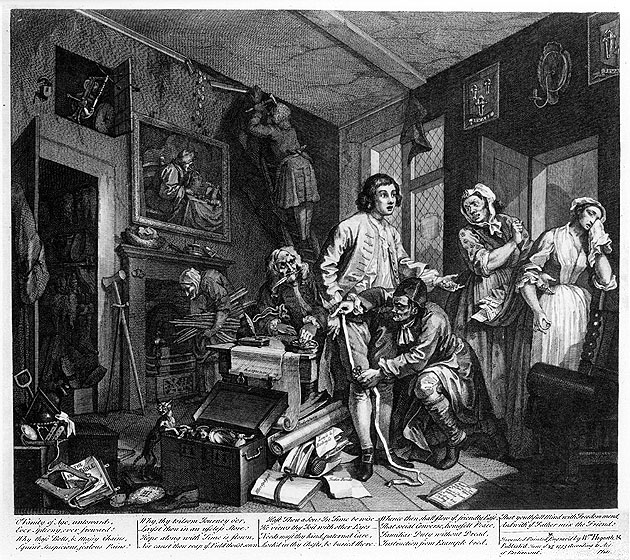
From William Hogarth's A Rake's Progress. "The Young Heir Takes Possession Of The Miser's Effects".

Inheritance is the practice of receiving private property, titles, debts, entitlements, privileges, rights, and obligations upon the death of an individual. The rules of inheritance differ among societies and have changed over time. In legal terms, succession is the process by which a deceased person's rights and property are transferred to their heirs, while inheritance is the property or assets those heirs receive.

Succession may occur either under the generally applicable statutory rules, referred to as intestate succession, or in accordance with the provisions outlined in a valid will. A will often must be attested by a notary or by other lawful means to be valid.

Legal systems can differ significantly in how property passes from a deceased person to their heirs, with common law jurisdictions typically requiring formal probate procedures, while civil law systems often allow heirs to acquire ownership automatically by operation of law - the principle of saisine or seizin (Quebec).

== Terminology ==
In law, an heir (fem (obs): heiress) is a person who is entitled to receive a share of property from a decedent (a person who died), subject to the rules of inheritance in the jurisdiction where the decedent was a citizen, or where the decedent died or owned property at the time of death.

The inheritance may be either under the terms of a will or by intestacy laws if the deceased had no will. However, the will must comply with the laws of the jurisdiction at the time it was created, or it will be declared invalid - for example, some states do not recognise handwritten wills as valid, or only in specific circumstances - and the intestacy laws then apply.

The exclusion from inheritance of a person who was an heir in a previous will, or would be expected to inherit under the laws of intestate succession, is termed disinheritance.

A person does not become an heir before the death of the deceased, since the exact identity of the persons entitled to inherit is determined only then. Members of ruling noble or royal houses who are expected to become heirs are called heirs apparent if first in line and incapable of being displaced from inheriting by another claim; otherwise, they are heirs presumptive. There is a further concept of joint inheritance, pending renunciation by all but one, which is called coparceny.

In modern law, the terms ‘'inheritance'’ and '‘heir’' apply only to property passed by intestate succession – that is, from a person who dies without a will. Property distributed under a will passes to beneficiaries, who may be called (Note: precise terminology depends on jurisdiction) devisees for real property, legatees for money, and recipients of bequests for other personal property.

Except in some jurisdictions where a person cannot be legally disinherited (such as the US state of Louisiana, which allows disinheritance only under specifically enumerated circumstances), a person who would otherwise be an heir (Note: as would be the case if were there no will and distribution if the estate according to the relevant intestacy laws would apply) may be disinherited completely under the terms of a will (an example is that of the will of comedian Jerry Lewis; his will specifically disinherited his six children by his first wife, and their descendants, leaving his entire estate to his second wife).

Inheritance has been compared to nepotism.

== History ==
Detailed anthropological and sociological studies have been conducted on customs of patrimonial inheritance, in which only male children can inherit. Some cultures also employ matrilineal succession, where property can only pass along the female line, most commonly to the decedent's sister's sons, but also, in some societies, to the mother and her daughters. Some ancient societies and most modern states employ egalitarian inheritance, without discrimination based on gender and/or birth order.

== Religious laws about inheritance ==
=== Jewish laws ===
The inheritance is patrimonial. The father —that is, the owner of the land— bequeaths only to his male descendants. According to the Law of Moses, the firstborn son was entitled to receive twice as much of his father's inheritance as the other sons (Deuteronomy 21:15–17).

If there were no living sons and no descendants of any previously living sons, daughters inherit. In Numbers 27, the five daughters of Zelophehad come to Moses and ask for their father's inheritance, as they have no brothers. The order of inheritance is set out: a man's sons inherit first, daughters if no sons, brothers if he has no children, and so on.

Later, in Numbers 36, some of the heads of the families of the tribe of Manasseh come to Moses and point out that if a daughter inherits and then marries a man not from her paternal tribe, her land will pass from her birth tribe's inheritance into her marriage tribe's. So a further rule is laid down: if a daughter inherits land, she must marry someone within her father's tribe. (The daughters of Zelophehad marry the sons of their father's brothers. There is no indication that this was not their choice.)

The laws of Jewish inheritance are discussed in the Talmud, in the Mishneh Torah and by Saadiah ben Joseph among other sources.

Philo of Alexandria and Josephus also comment on the Jewish laws of inheritance, praising them above other law codes of their time. They also agreed that the firstborn son must receive a double portion of his father's estate.

=== Christian laws ===
At first, Christianity did not have its own inheritance traditions distinct from Judaism. With the accession of Emperor Constantine in 306, Christians began to distance themselves from Judaism and to exert influence over the laws and practices of secular institutions. From the beginning, this included inheritance. The Roman practice of adoption was a specific target because it was perceived as in conflict with the Judeo-Christian doctrine of primogeniture. As Stephanie Coontz documents in Marriage, a History (Penguin, 2006), not only succession but the whole constellation of rights and practices that included marriage, adoption, legitimacy, consanguinity, and inheritance changed in Western Europe from a Greco-Roman model to a Judeo-Christian pattern, based on Biblical and traditional Judeo-Christian principles. The transformation was essentially complete in the Middle Ages, although in English-speaking countries there was additional development under the influence of Protestantism. Even when Europe became secularized and Christianity faded into the background, the legal foundation Christendom had laid remained. Only in the era of modern jurisprudence have there been significant changes.

=== Islamic laws ===
The Quran introduced some rights and restrictions regarding inheritance, including general improvements in the treatment of women and family life compared to the pre-Islamic societies of the Arabian Peninsula. Furthermore, the Quran introduced additional heirs that were not entitled to inheritance in pre-Islamic times, mentioning nine relatives specifically of which six were female and three were male. However, the inheritance rights of women remained different from those of men because in Islam, someone always has the responsibility of looking after a woman's expenses. According to 4:11, for example, a son is entitled to twice as much inheritance as a daughter. The Quran also presented efforts to fix the laws of inheritance, and thus forming a complete legal system. This development was in contrast to pre-Islamic societies, where rules of inheritance varied considerably. In addition to the above changes, the Quran imposed restrictions on testamentary powers of a Muslim in disposing their property.

Three verses of the Quran, 4:11, 4:12, and 4:176, give specific details on inheritance and shares, in addition to a few other verses dealing with testamentary matters. But this information was used as a starting point by Muslim jurists who expounded the laws of inheritance even further using Hadith, as well as methods of juristic reasoning like Qiyas. Nowadays, inheritance is considered an integral part of Sharia law and its application for Muslims is mandatory. However, many Muslim people (see Historical inheritance systems) follow other inheritance customs.

== Inequality ==
Over time, wealth passes from generation to generation through inheritance. In 2024, the Silent Generation and baby boomers represented 25% of the population, but held 65% of all wealth in the US.

Older generations have accumulated more average wealth per person (vertical axis), but baby boomers as a group have the largest amount of wealth (areas within each rectangle). An estimated 73.9% of inheritors are already in the top ten percentiles of net worth.

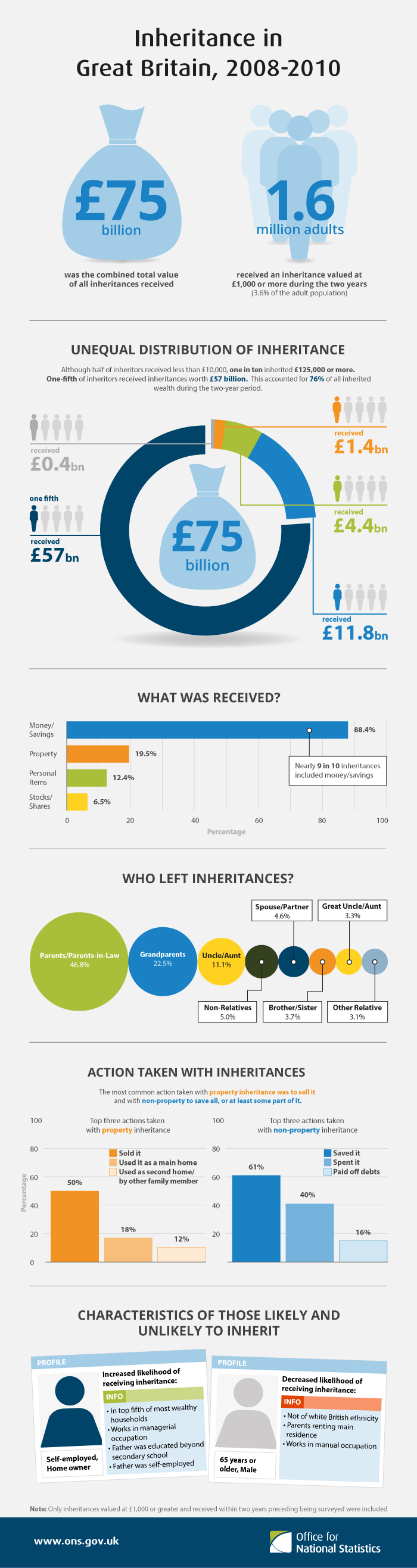
Inheritance by amount and distribution received and action taken with inheritances in Great Britain between 2008 and 2010

The distribution of inherited wealth has varied greatly across cultures and legal traditions. In nations using civil law, for example, the right of children to inherit wealth from their parents in predefined ratios is enshrined in law. as far back as the Code of Hammurabi (ca. 1750 BC). In the US State of Louisiana, the only US state where the legal system is derived from the Napoleonic Code, this system is known as "forced heirship" which prohibits disinheritance of adult children except for a few narrowly defined reasons that a parent is obligated to prove. Other legal traditions, particularly in nations using common law, allow inheritances to be divided however one wishes, or to disinherit any child for any reason.

In cases of unequal inheritance, the majority might receive a small share while the minority receives a larger share. The amount of inheritance is often far less than the value of a business initially given to the son, especially when a son takes over a thriving multimillion-dollar business. Yet the daughter is given the balance of the actual inheritance, which amounts to far less than the value of the business initially given to the son. This is especially seen in old-world cultures, but continues in many families to this day.

Arguments for eliminating forced heirship include the right to property and the merit of individual allocation of capital over government wealth confiscation and redistribution, but this does not resolve what some describe as the problem of unequal inheritance. In terms of inheritance inequality, some economists and sociologists focus on the intergenerational transmission of income or wealth, which is said to directly affect one's mobility (or immobility) and class position in society. Nations differ on the political structure and policy options that govern the transfer of wealth.

According to the American federal government statistics compiled by Mark Zandi in 1985, the average US inheritance was $39,000. In subsequent years, the total annual inheritance more than doubled, reaching nearly $200 billion. By 2050, an estimated $25 trillion in inheritance will be transmitted across generations.

Some researchers have attributed this rise to the baby boomers generation. Historically, the baby boomers were the largest influx of children conceived after World War II. For this reason, Thomas Shapiro suggests that this generation "is in the midst of benefiting from the greatest inheritance of wealth in history". Inherited wealth may help explain why many Americans who have become rich may have had a "substantial head start". In September 2012, according to the Institute for Policy Studies, "over 60 percent" of the Forbes richest 400 Americans "grew up in substantial privilege", and often (but not always) received substantial inheritances.

Other research has shown that many inheritances, large or small, are rapidly squandered. Similarly, analysis shows that over two-thirds of high-wealth families lose their wealth within two generations; almost 80% of high-wealth parents "feel the next generation is not financially responsible [and/or competent] enough to handle inheritance".

=== Social stratification ===
It has been argued that inheritance significantly affects social stratification. Inheritance is an integral component of family, economic, and legal institutions, and a basic mechanism of class stratification. It also affects the distribution of wealth at the societal level. The total cumulative effect of inheritance on stratification outcomes takes three forms, according to scholars who have examined the subject.

The first form of inheritance is the inheritance of cultural capital (i.e., linguistic styles, higher status social circles, and aesthetic preferences). The second form of inheritance is through familial interventions in the form of inter vivos transfers (i.e., gifts between the living), especially at crucial junctures in the life courses. Examples include milestones such as going to college, getting married, getting a job, and purchasing a home. The third form of inheritance is the transfer of bulk estates at the time of death of the testators, thus resulting in significant economic advantage accruing to their children. The average age of receiving an inheritance has been estimated at around 60 years. The origin of the stability of inequalities is material (personal possessions one can obtain) and is also cultural, rooted either in varying child-rearing practices that are geared to socialization according to social class and economic position. Child-rearing practices among those who inherit wealth may center around favoring some groups at the expense of others at the bottom of the social hierarchy.

=== Sociological and economic effects of inheritance inequality ===
It is further argued that the degree to which economic status and inheritance are transmitted across generations determines one's life chances in society. Although many have linked one's social origins and educational attainment to life chances and opportunities, education is not the most influential predictor of economic mobility. In fact, children of well-off parents generally receive better schooling and benefit from material, cultural, and genetic inheritances. Likewise, schooling attainment is often persistent across generations, and families with higher amounts of inheritance can acquire and transmit higher amounts of human capital. Lower amounts of human capital and inheritance can perpetuate inequality in the housing market and higher education. Research reveals that inheritance plays an important role in the accumulation of housing wealth. Those who receive an inheritance are more likely to own a home than those who do not, regardless of the size of the inheritance.

Often, racial or religious minorities and individuals from socially disadvantaged backgrounds receive less inheritance and wealth. As a result, mixed races might be excluded in inheritance privilege and are more likely to rent homes or live in poorer neighborhoods, as well as achieve lower educational attainment compared with whites in America.

Nations with the highest income and wealth inequalities often have the highest rates of homicide and disease (such as obesity, diabetes, and hypertension), which results in high mortality rates. A New York Times article reveals that the U.S. is the world's wealthiest nation, but "ranks twenty-ninth in life expectancy, right behind Jordan and Bosnia" and "has the second highest mortality rate of the comparable OECD countries". This has been attributed to the significant gap of inheritance inequality in the country, although there are clearly other factors, such as the affordability of healthcare.

When social and economic inequalities centered on inheritance are perpetuated by major social institutions such as the family, education, and religion, these differing life opportunities are argued to be transmitted across generations. As a result, this inequality is believed to become part of the overall social structure.

Women's unequal inheritance rights refer to the disparities and discriminatory practices that women face in inheriting property and assets compared to men. These inequalities stem from a combination of legal, cultural, and religious practices that often prioritize male heirs over female ones, resulting in significant socio-economic consequences for women.

=== Dynastic wealth ===
Dynastic wealth is monetary inheritance passed down to generations that did not earn it. Dynastic wealth is linked to the term Plutocracy. Much has been written about the rise and influence of dynastic wealth, including the bestselling book Capital in the Twenty-First Century by the French economist Thomas Piketty.

Bill Gates uses the term in his article "Why Inequality Matters".

=== Soviet response to inheritance ===
As Communism is founded on the Marxist Labor Theory of Value, any money collected in the course of a lifetime is justified if it was based on the fruits of the person's own labor and not from exploiting others. The first communist government installed after the Russian Revolution resolved to abolish the right of inheritance regardless of being the result of someone's work or exploitation, with some exceptions.

== Taxation ==
Many states have inheritance taxes or estate taxes, under which a portion of any inheritance or estate becomes government revenue.

== Inheritance and pensions ==
=== United Arab Emirates ===
In the United Arab Emirates, government pensions can, under specific conditions, be transferred to heirs upon a pensioner's death. This reflects a broader approach in some countries to support families of deceased retirees.

== See also ==
- Beneficiary – Person or other legal entity who receives money or other benefits from a benefactor
- Civil law – Legal system originating in Western Europe
- Common law – Law created by judicial precedent
- Digital inheritance – Passing down of digital assets after a person's death
- Inheritance laws by jurisdiction
  - Inheritance law in ancient Rome
  - Inheritance law in Bulgaria
  - Inheritance law in Canada
  - Inheritance law in Switzerland
- Smart contract – Contractual transaction on a decentralized platform
- Transformative asset – Concept devised by Thomas Shapiro
- Estate planning – Process of planning for inheritance of property
- Family law – Area of the law that deals with family matters and domestic relations
