= Inheritance law in Canada =

Inheritance law in Canada is constitutionally a provincial matter. Therefore, the laws governing inheritance in Canada is legislated by each individual province.

== Provincial and territorial estate laws ==
=== Ontario ===
Inheritance law in Ontario is governed by the Succession Law Reform Act (SLRA). The SLRA sets out the rules for how property is distributed when someone dies without a will (intestate) and how to probate a will.

==== Wills ====
In order to have a valid will in Ontario, it must meet the following requirements:

- The will must be in writing and signed by the testator (the person making the will)
- The testator must be of legal age (18 years old) and have mental capacity to make a will
- The will must be signed in the presence of two witnesses who must also sign the will in the presence of the testator and each other. The witnesses cannot be beneficiaries of the will.
- If the will is not a holographic will, it must also be attested to by an affidavit of execution before it can be submitted for probate.
- The executors of the will can be beneficiaries, but the witnesses cannot.

It also allows for the creation of holographic will, which is a will written entirely in the testator's handwriting and signed by the testator; no witnesses or formalities are required.Accordingly, there can be no affidavit of execution. As part of the probate application, when being challenged, the executor may instead be asked to provide the Court with evidence that the signature and the handwriting on the Will are those of the deceased.

==== Probate ====
The process of probate in Ontario is a legal process where a court approves the validity of a will and grants authority to the executor named in the will to distribute the deceased person's assets according to the instructions in the will. The process involves several steps.

== Intestate Succession ==
Where a person dies intestate, the following general rules apply:

- Where the spouse survives, all the estate goes to the spouse.
- Where there is a spouse and a child or children, the estate is divided as follows:

First however a matrimonial home will generally pass directly to the spouse.

Province	Preferential share to spouse (after debts are paid)	Remaining assets (spouse + 1 child)	Remaining assets (spouse + >1 child)	Notes
British Columbia	$300,000 if both the deceased and the spouse are parents of the descendants. $150,000 if the spouse is not parent to all the descendants.	1/2 to spouse, 1/2 to child	1/2 to spouse, 1/2 to children	"Spouse": Were married or in a marriage-like relationship for 2 years up until the death.; Spouses aren't considered to have separated if they reconcile and live together again within one year of separation, and they continue to live together for one or more periods totalling 90 days.
Alberta	nil	All to spouse, where all of the children are also children of the surviving spouse. Otherwise, prescribed amount or 1/2 (whichever is greater) to spouse, and remainder to child.	All to spouse, where all of the children are also children of the surviving spouse. Otherwise, prescribed amount or 1/2 (whichever is greater) to spouse, and remainder to children.	"Spouse": Includes an adult interdependent partner; Excludes those separated for more than two years, or who had previously executed a separation agreement; Special rules where there is both a surviving spouse and a surviving adult interdependent partner Where adult interdependent partner is also related to the deceased, there is exclusion from any further allocation from the estate
Saskatchewan	$100,000	1/2 to spouse, 1/2 to child	1/3 to spouse, 2/3 to children	"Spouse": Includes common-law partners; Excludes legally married spouses who were cohabiting with someone else at the date of death
Manitoba	$50,000 or 1/2 (whichever is greater)	All to spouse, where all of the children are also children of the surviving spouse. Otherwise, 1/2 to spouse, 1/2 to child.	All to spouse, where all of the children are also children of the surviving spouse. Otherwise, 1/2 to spouse, 1/2 to children.	"Spouse": Includes common-law partners; Includes separated spouses and common-law partners who had not previously divided their assets under a separation agreement
Ontario	$350,000	1/2 to spouse, 1/2 to child	1/3 to spouse, 2/3 to children	Extends only to legally married spouses; Spouse may opt for equalization payment under s. 5 of the Family Law Act, if it results in a greater share; Intestacy benefit is in addition to any separation payment received previously or upon death
Quebec	nil	1/3 to spouse, 2/3 to child	1/3 to spouse, 2/3 to children	"Spouse": Includes those joined in a civil union; Where a marriage contract or a notarial civil union contract exists, any relevant provisions in it will supersede the rules on intestate succession
New Brunswick	Marital property	1/2 to spouse, 1/2 to child	1/3 to spouse, 2/3 to children	Extends only to legally married spouses; "Child" does not include a stepchild
Nova Scotia	$50,000	1/2 to spouse, 1/2 to child	1/3 to spouse, 2/3 to children	Extends only to legally married spouses; Excludes spouses "living in adultery", i.e. in another conjugal relationship whether registered or not; Spouse may claim "matrimonial home" instead of share, regardless of value; "Child" does not include a stepchild or a child raised by a non-biological parent that has not been legally adopted
Prince Edward Island	nil	1/2 to spouse, 1/2 to child	1/3 to spouse, 2/3 to children	Extends only to legally married spouses; "Child" does not include a stepchild
Newfoundland and Labrador	nil	1/2 to spouse, 1/2 to child	1/3 to spouse, 2/3 to children	Extends only to legally married spouses; "Child" does not include a stepchild; Spouse may opt for equalization payment under the Family Law Act, if it results in a greater share
Yukon	$75,000	1/2 to spouse, 1/2 to child	1/3 to spouse, 2/3 to children	Common-law spouses may apply to the court for a share of the estate; "Child" does not include a stepchild
Northwest Territories	$50,000	1/2 to spouse, 1/2 to child	1/3 to spouse, 2/3 to children	"Spouse": Includes common-law partners; Excludes legally married spouses who were cohabiting with someone else at the date of death, had initiated divorce proceedings and had not reconciled, or had previously divided their assets on separation; Excludes a legally married spouse where the intestate had entered into a spousal relationship with another person; "Child" does not include a stepchild
Nunavut	$50,000	1/2 to spouse, 1/2 to child	1/3 to spouse, 2/3 to children	As for NWT

- Where there is no surviving spouse but there are surviving children, the estate is divided equally among the children.
- Where there is no surviving spouse or children, the estate devolves according to the rules of consanguinity.
- Where no heir can be determined, the estate is declared bona vacantia and escheats to the Crown.

== See also ==
- Estate planning
- Will and testament
- Ethical will
- Holographic will
- Will Aid
- Will contest
- Power of attorney
- Segregated_fund#Probate_protection
