= Saadia (given name) =

Arabic, Hebrew and Berber masculine proper name

Saadia (Arabic: سعدية, Hebrew: סעדיה) or Saadiya is an Arabic, Hebrew and Berber masculine and feminine proper name. It is used as a forename and more rarely as a surname. According to some classical rabbinical sources, the name derives from the Hebrew verb Sa'ad (Hebrew: סעד, support), and means "God has supported". According to researchers at the Wissenschaft des Judentums, however, it is an artificially Hebrewised form of the Arabic name Sa'id (Happy سعيد). It is common that in Arabic-speaking countries, people called Saadia are also known as Sa'id.

Saadia Gaon seems to have been the first to have borne this forename, and is often just referred to as "Saadia," without further explanation; signing himself 'Sa'id ben Yosef' at the beginning of his career, he went on, in his work 'Sefer haGalouï' to call himself "Saadyahou" (סעדיהו). Moses ibn Ezra also uses the form Sa'adel (סעדאל).

== People with the given name ==
- Saadia Gaon (892–942), rabbi, Jewish philosopher, and exegete of the Geonic period
- Saadia Ibn Danan (died 1493), rabbi, poet, and Dayan in Grenada
- Saadiah ben Joseph ha-Levi (16th century), rabbi in Yemen
- Saadia Marciano (1950–2007), Israeli social activist, politician, and founder of the Black Panthers
- Saadia Himi (born 1984), Dutch model and beauty queen
- Saadia Kobashi (1904–1990), leader of Yemenite Jews in Israel and one of the signatories to Israel's declaration of independence
- Saadiya Kochar, Indian photographer and solo traveller
- Rabbi Saadia "Mercado" Halevi

== See also ==
- Saadia (disambiguation)
