= Insane delusion =

Insane delusion is the legal term of art in the common law tradition used to describe a false conception of reality that a testator of a will adheres to against all reason and evidence to the contrary. A will made by a testator suffering from an insane delusion that affects the provisions made in the will may fail in whole or in part. Only the portion of the will caused by the insane delusion fails, including potentially the entire will. Will contests often involve claims that the testator was suffering from an insane delusion.

An insane delusion is distinct from testamentary capacity. A testator might be suffering from an insane delusion but otherwise possess the requisite capacity to make a will. Similarly, an insane delusion is distinct from a mere mistake. If suffering from an insane delusion, a testator is not subject to change their mind regarding the delusion if presented with contrary evidence, whereas a mistake is capable of being corrected if the testator is told the truth. Additionally, while an insane delusion may cause portions of a will to fail, most courts will not reform or invalidate a will because of a mistake unless it was the result of fraud.

== Origin ==
The insane delusion concept was created in the 1826 British case Dew v. Clark. In that case, a father believed that his daughter was "the devil incarnate" and disinherited her in his will of 1818. After her father's death, evidence presented by the daughter showed that she was well known for her good disposition and that her father had falsely told others that he lavished his daughter with praise and wealth. The probate court found that the father's mindset when he made the 1818 will was normal in all respects except toward his daughter. The court found that his thoughts about her, "did and could only proceed from, and be founded in, insanity," a "partial insanity" that only extended to his thoughts about his daughter and caused him to disinherit her. The court said that this delusion caused the will to fail.

== Examples ==
In the 1854 case Addington v. Wilson, the Indiana Supreme Court held that a testator who disinherited his daughters because he believed them to be witches was not for that reason alone so insane as to deem him incapable of making a valid will. The court justified its decision by pointing to distinguished jurists and religious figures who affirmed the possibility of witchcraft; if these people's beliefs did not render them insane, neither did the testator's.

In In re Robertson's Estate (1948), the Supreme Court of Oklahoma held that a testator who declared that he had "no children" and "no deceased children" in his will, when he actually had two living children, was suffering from an insane delusion, as the testator had "no rational basis whatsoever" to declare that he had no children.
