= Specific devise =

A specific devise is a devise of a distinct piece of real estate to a certain person or persons. It is analogous to a specific legacy, but is limited (by the word "devise") to real estate. Furthermore, the testator intends for that very particular property and only that property to satisfy the devise. For example, a specific devise might be "my house on 2006 Fake Street."
