= Laner V'livsamim (song) =

Laner V'livsamim is a Jewish Yemenite acrostic poem and popular melody, traditionally sung upon the completion of Shabbat alongside other traditional melodies. The first letters of lines 2–6 spell the name Saadiah, referring to its author Saadiah ben Joseph.

== Lyrics ==
Laner V'livsamim
לַנֵּר וְלִבְשָׂמִים נַפְשִׁי מְיַחֵלָה, אִם תִּתְּנוּ לִי כּוֹס יַיִן לְהַבְדָּלָה

סֹלּוּ דְּרָכִים לִי פַּנּוּ לְנָבוֹכָה, פִּתְחוּ שְׁעָרִים לִי כָּל מַלְאֲכֵי מַעְלָה
עֵינַי אֲנִי אֶשָּׂא אֶל אֵל בְּלֵב כּוֹסֵף, מַמְצִיא צְרָכַי לִי בַּיּוֹם וּבַלַּיְלָה
דֵּי מַחְסוֹר תֶּן לִי מֵאוֹצְרוֹת טוּבָךְ, כִּי לַחֲסָדֶיךָ אֵין קֵץ וְאֵין תִּכְלָה
יִתְחַדְּשָּׁה גִּילִי טַרְפִי וְטוֹבָתִי, תָּסִיר יְגוֹנוֹתַי מַכְאוֹב וּמַאְפֵלָה

הִנֵּה יְמֵי מַעְשֶׂה מִתְחַדְּשִׁים תָּמִיד, יִתְחַדְּשָׁה בָּהֶם שָׁלוֹם וְטוֹב סֶלָה

== See also ==
- Havdalah
