= Testamentary capacity =

Ability to make or alter valid wills

In the common law tradition, testamentary capacity is the legal term of art used to describe a person's legal and mental ability to make or alter a valid will. This concept has also been called sound mind and memory or disposing mind and memory.

== Presumption of capacity ==
Adults are presumed to have the ability to make a will. Litigation about testamentary capacity typically revolves around charges that the testator, by virtue of senility, dementia, insanity, or other unsoundness of mind, lacked the mental capacity to make a will. In essence, the doctrine requires those who would challenge a validly executed will to demonstrate that the testator did not know the consequence of their conduct when they executed the will.

Certain people, such as minors, are usually deemed to be conclusively incapable of making a will by the common law; however, minors who serve in the military are conceded the right to make a will by statute in many jurisdictions. In South Africa, however, one acquires testamentary capacity at the age of 16 years.

== Requirements ==
The requirements for testamentary capacity are minimal. Some courts have held that a person who lacked the capacity to make a contract can nevertheless make a valid will. While the wording of statutes or judicial rulings will vary from one jurisdiction to another, the test generally requires that the testator was aware of:

1. The extent and value of their property.
2. The persons who are the natural beneficiaries
3. The disposition they are making
4. How these elements relate to form an orderly plan of distribution of property.

The legal test implies that a typical claimant in a will contest is a disgruntled heir who believes they should have received a larger share than they did under the will. Once the challenging party meets the burden of proof that the testator did not possess the capacity, the burden subsequently shifts to the party propounding the will to show by clear and convincing evidence that the testator did have the requisite capacity.

== Proof of testamentary capacity ==
Those who contest a will for lack of testamentary capacity must typically show that the decedent suffered from mental unsoundness that left them unable to remember family members or caused them to hold insane delusions about them. Dead Man's Statutes sometimes restrict evidence which can be admitted concerning transactions with the decedent.

Lawyers for people whose testamentary capacity might be called into question often arrange for a will execution to be video taped. On video, they ask the testator about his property and about his family, and go over the contents of the testator's will.

The testamentary capacity matter is most frequently raised posthumously, when an aggrieved heir contests the will entered into probate. For this reason, in the absence of the ability to interview the testator directly, a forensic psychiatrist or forensic psychologist may evaluate a testator's capacity by reviewing videotape of the drafting of the will, emails or letters, medical records, and other records. Along with resolving an examinee's testamentary capacity, a forensic specialist may observe for signs of undue influence, particularly susceptibility to undue influence.

Even when a testator is found to have lacked testamentary capacity due to senility, loss of memory due to the aging process, infirmity or insanity, courts will sometimes rule that the testator had a "temporary period of lucidity" or a "lucid moment" at the time of the execution of the testamentary instrument. Such finding will validate a will that would otherwise be denied probate.

A way to forestall a will contest would be to have a self-proving will, in which an affidavit of the witnesses to the will specifically swear or affirm that the will was prepared under the supervision of an attorney.

=== Testamentary capacity in England and Wales ===
Where a will is rational, professionally drawn, seemingly regular in form and is made by a person whose capacity is not in doubt, there is a presumption that the will is valid. This presumption can be rebutted by a challenger to the will showing that there is a real doubt about capacity. At this point the burden of proving capacity moves to the propounder of the will to then show that there was testamentary capacity at the time the will was executed.

The current test comes from the decision in Banks v Goodfellow (1870). This case concerned the validity of the will of John Banks. In modern terms he would most likely be described as a paranoid schizophrenic. He suffered from delusions that he was being persecuted by devils (they were sometimes visible to him) and also by a deceased local grocer. His will was challenged on the basis that he was insane and therefore unable to make a will. The will was found to be valid after trial by jury, before Brett J, at Cumberland Spring Assizes in 1869. On appeal, this judgment was confirmed unanimously by a panel of four appeal judges in Queen's Bench. The will was found to be valid, not influenced by his delusions, and deemed rational, being in favour of his only close relative (who also lived with him). In his judgment, Cockburn CJ set out a test of the capacity to make a valid will, which is still applied in many Anglophone jurisdictions today. It is now considered as being composed of four distinct elements: (1) understanding the nature of the act of making a will and its effect, (2) understanding the extent of the property that is to be disposed of, (3) understanding the claims of family or friendship to which ought to be given effect and as a separate element, (4) that no mental disorder or delusion shall influence his will in way that would not have occurred otherwise. This remains the test today, notwithstanding the Mental Capacity Act 2005.

In addition, in the original wording, [1], [2] and [3] are all approached as not requiring actual understanding, but instead being capable of understanding. As this is a common law test created by judges, it is capable of being modified by judges, as they see fit in the light of modern circumstances. Modern psychiatric knowledge has allowed the test to be developed by having a further element added and that is for the testator to be capable of exercising his decision-making powers.

This test is focussed on the ability of the particular individual and his particular estate. The outcome is always unique to the particular facts. Where the circumstances and assets of a testator are simple or straightforward the level of capacity required will be lower than that for the testator with complex circumstances and assets. Additionally, this test is expressly designed for the capability of a person to make a will. It is not, therefore, a test that has an application to any other transactions, save one – the capacity to make substantial lifetime gifts. The leading English decision in this area is Re Beaney (deceased).

The test in Banks v Goodfellow has proved to be long lasting as it was not a definition in medical terms, but a plain English definition of what a person should be capable of understanding in order to make a will. The test is still applied by a court. A medical opinion, while being potentially valuable evidence, is not determinative of capacity unless accepted as such by the court. The evidence of the will draftsman has considerable value to the court, if he has carried out his work to an acceptable standard. The will draftsman is required to have knowledge of the legal test of capacity and what its implications are, in order to record his relevant observations of the testator and form an opinion of his client's capacity. This, coupled with much greater prominence of negligence claims against will draftsmen, means that a careful understanding of what the draftsman should be doing becomes vital.

== See also ==
- Capacity (law)
- Memory
- Memory and aging

== Case Law ==
- Addington v. Wilson, 5 Blackf. (Ind.) 137, 61 Am.Dec. 81 (Sup. Ct. Ind. 1854)
- Allman v. Malsbury, 224 Ind. 177, 65 N.E.2d 106 (Sup. Ct. Ind. 1946)
- Hays v. Harmon, 809 N.E.2d 460 (Ind. Ct. App., 2004)
