= Saadia (disambiguation) =

Saadia may refer to:

- Saadia (given name)
- Dany Saadia (born 1969), Mexican entrepreneur, screenwriter, and filmmaker
- Nouara Saadia (born 1950), Algerian politician
- Saadia (film), a 1953 adventure film

== See also ==
- Saadiyat Island, a natural island and a tourism-cultural project for nature and Emirati heritage and culture that is located in Abu Dhabi, United Arab Emirates
