= Contractors Bonding v Snee =

- Court: Court of Appeal of New Zealand
- Full case name: Contractors Bonding v Snee
- Decided: 6 November 1991
- Citation: [1992] 2 NZLR 157

Court membership
- Judges sitting: Richardson J, Gault J, McKay J

Keywords
- undue influence

Contractors Bonding v Snee [1992] 2 NZLR 157 is a leading New Zealand case regarding undue influence.

== Background ==
Snee's son, Mr Savage, purchased a travel agency. In order to be a travel agent, it needed to pay a bond of $50,000 to the Travel Agents Association. To satisfy this requirement, they arranged for Contractors Bonding to issue the bond, but they required suitable security before this bond was given.

To satisfy this requirement, Savage approached his mother, convincing her to guarantee this bond, supported by a mortgage over her house. She gave this guarantee, despite the fact her lawyer had advised her not once, but twice, to not give the guarantee.

Savage received her guarantee documents from his lawyers, and took them to his mother to sign.

Two years later, after customer funds disappeared, resulting in Contractors Bonding seeking reimbursement of the bond from Mrs Snee, and started mortgagee proceedings against her house, although she managed to obtain an injunction from the High Court to stop this, pleading duress, undue influence, and unconscionable bargain, as amongst other things, it was held that she suffered a significant mental impairment due to her alcoholism.

Contractors Bonding appealed.

== Held ==
The Court ruled that whilst Savage exercised undue influence over his mother, however as Savage was not acting as the agent of Contractors Bonding, no undue influence could be imputed against them. Accordingly, the guarantee and the mortgage were both ruled to be legally enforceable against Mrs Snee.
