= Specific legacy =

A specific legacy (or specific bequest) is a testamentary gift of a precisely identifiable object, distinguished from all other things of the same kind — such as, a gift of a particular piece of jewelry.

== See also ==
- Specific devise
- Testator
- Will (law)
