= The Testament (Grisham novel) =

Novel by John Grisham

- First edition cover
- Author: John Grisham
- Language: English
- Genre: Adventure Story
- Publisher: Doubleday
- Publication date: 2 February 1999
- Publication place: United States
- Media type: Hardcover Paperback
- Pages: 448
- ISBN: 0-09-924502-7

The Testament is an adventure story by American author John Grisham. It was published in hardcover by Doubleday on February 2, 1999.

== Plot ==
Troy Phelan, an eccentric elderly billionaire, writes a final, holographic will before leaping from a balcony to his death. He leaves his vast fortune to an illegitimate daughter, Rachel Lane, instead of his six children by three marriages. Her existence comes as a total surprise to everyone. Troy's reason is revulsion over years of fighting with, and embarrassment from, his family, as well as their greed — much of which was due to his neglect and mistreatment of each family.

Troy's lawyers are now tasked with protecting his wishes, as well as finding the heiress. Nate O'Riley, a high-powered litigation lawyer and recovering alcoholic, is sent to Brazil, where Rachel is believed to be living as a missionary. Back in Virginia, Troy's family does everything in their power to contest the new will. They argue that although Troy was examined by three psychiatrists just prior to his death, he was lacking sanity at the time of the new will.

Nate's journey into the Pantanal by way of Corumbá nearly kills Nate, but finally he and his guide locate the tribe with which Rachel is living. She refuses her inheritance or anything connected with it; Nate is unable to convince her otherwise. Incidentally, he falls in love with her and is influenced by her to seek a relationship with God. Contracting dengue fever, when lying delirious in the hospital he seems to see Rachel standing by his bed and saying, "Nate, don't die, God has plans for you".

Meanwhile, Troy's ex-wives, children and respective lawyers continue attempting to destroy and disprove all evidence of his sanity and even the will itself. They finally decide not to contest the will in court, fearing that their testimony during the deposition will hurt their case. They also realize that two witnesses for the families are lying and would be torn to shreds by Nate should a trial ever take place. To settle the matter, Nate agrees that Troy's families will be paid $50 million each (minus lawyers' fees) to stop turning the will contest into a legal quagmire.

When all is over, Nate returns to the jungle in order to get Rachel to sign off on the settlement. But when he arrives, he learns that Rachel has died from malaria. She has, however, left instructions that the money be put into a trust for the benefit of indigenous peoples and that Nate will have control of the trust. The end of the book shows Nate riding off in a boat into the Pantanal, not caring if it takes a month to get back to civilization.

== Characters ==
Troy Phelan, an eccentric, reclusive, ruthless billionaire businessman, commits suicide. In order to cut his family out of his will, he makes a fake will a few hours before his suicide, putting his family into that will. Minutes before his suicide, he shows his lawyer a new will that he would like carried out. This will leave only enough money to each of his heirs to pay off their debts up until the day of his death, and leaves everything else to Rachel Lane, an illegitimate daughter that none of his family and associates know about.

Josh Stafford, Troy's lawyer, confidant, and executor, must find Rachel, but he knows only that she is a missionary somewhere in Brazil. He decides to assign Nate O'Riley, a former high-powered litigator and recovering alcoholic, to find her. Nate is emerging from his fourth stay in rehab, and he reluctantly agrees to go. Josh manipulates the situation from behind the scenes.

Rachel Lane, an illegitimate daughter whom Troy wills eleven billion dollars to. She is a missionary in Brazil who wants nothing to do with the money and refuses to sign any legal papers. She was re-contacted by her father when she was a teenager. Troy paid for her to attend college, but she then disappeared into medical school and seminary. She dies after contracting malaria.

Nate O'Riley, the lawyer sent to find Rachel Lane. He has been off-and-on drugs/alcohol several times, crashing harder every time. A workaholic whose habits have shattered both of his marriages; he is sent to Brazil to get him away from the office. He has two children from his first marriage and two younger children from his second marriage. His encounter with Rachel eventually sets him on a path to spiritual redemption. He grows feelings for Rachel before she dies.

Father Phil Lancaster, the Rector of Holy Trinity Church in St Michaels, Maryland, who makes Nate welcome.

The Phelan Children, six children who were born to three different women (a seventh one died in a car accident). All of them, despite being given a gift of $5 million at the age of 21, are either broke or heavily in debt. They are desperate for a cut of Troy's wealth and employ even greedier lawyers.

- Troy Junior: The oldest child. On his second marriage, his business ventures always end in failure. He was kicked out of college for selling drugs. Completely spent his $5 million before he was thirty and was fired from multiple positions in his father's company.
- Rex Phelan: The second child. Currently owes more than $7 million and is under investigation by the FBI for being a director in a failed bank. Runs a series of strip clubs although all his assets are in the name of his wife, herself an ex-stripper.
- Libbigail Phelan Jeter: The oldest daughter by Troy's first marriage with a long history of drug abuse. Currently married to her third husband, an ex-biker she met while in rehab.
- Mary Ross Phelan Jackman: The youngest child from Troy's first marriage. The only Phelan heir still married to his or her first spouse. Considered the least volatile and most level-headed of her siblings, being the only one without any arrests, addictions or expulsions. She and her husband (an orthopedist) live a wealthy lifestyle but are heavily in debt.
- Geena Phelan Strong: The surviving child of Troy's second marriage (her brother Rocky was killed in a car crash in high school). Married to her second husband, whose business ventures have all been poor investments. Described with her husband as being "two immature kids living a pampered life with someone else's money, and dreaming of the big score." Shifty, dishonest, glib and quick with the half-truth, thus considered as being the most dangerous of the heirs.
- Ramble Phelan: The youngest child overall, and the only one from Troy's third marriage is fourteen years old and hasn't received any money yet. Only attends school when he feels like it, lives in his basement, avoids his mother as much as possible, has never had a paying job, played any sports or seen the inside of a church. Likes to play the guitar and dreams of being a rock star. Considered to be the "scariest" of the Phelan heirs.

== Film adaptation ==
According to The Hollywood Reporter, in 2009, producers Mark Johnson and Hunt Lowry were developing a film adaptation of The Testament. Stuart Blumberg was attached to direct the film adaptation.
