= Saisine =

Saisine, is a term defined with succession and inheritance law that refers to a legal principle that governs the automatic transfer of a deceased person's property, rights, and obligations to their heirs. This principle is notably prevalent in civil law jurisdictions, such as France, Germany and Quebec.

== History ==
The term saisine as it is used nowadays in civil law, originates from the French legal maxim 'le mort saisit le vif', literally translated as 'the dead seizes the living.' This reflects the concept that upon death, the deceased's estate is immediately vested in the heirs without the need for formal procedures like probate. In essence, the heirs automatically acquire legal possession of the estate, subject to any liabilities or debts associated with it.

The figure was introduced at the time as a reaction to the feudal system of the Ancien Régime. The saisine was intended to ensure that a person's estate passed automatically and immediately to their heirs upon death and did not revert to any feudal lord. This figure was enshrined in the Napoleonic Code of 1804 and was thus adopted into the Belgian and Dutch Civil Code.

== Application in Civil Law Systems ==
In civil law jurisdictions, the saisine principle allows heirs to assume ownership of the deceased's estate immediately upon death, provided they accept the inheritance. This automatic transfer is subject to the heirs' acceptance, which can be unconditional, limited to the value of the estate's net assets, or waived entirely. However, if there are forced heirs (those entitled to a portion of the estate by law), they must be consulted before the estate is distributed.

The Civil Code of Quebec for instance, stipulates that lawful heirs are automatically vested with the property, rights, and actions of the deceased by operation of law, subject to the obligation of settling any debts or liabilities of the estate.

== Comparison with Common Law Systems ==
In contrast, common law jurisdictions, such as the United States and England, typically require formal procedures like probate to transfer property upon death. In these systems, an executor or administrator is appointed to manage the deceased's estate, ensuring that debts are settled and assets are distributed according to the will or, in the absence of a will, according to statutory intestacy laws. This process can be more time-consuming and involves judicial oversight.

The principle of saisine exemplifies a fundamental difference between civil law and common law systems in handling succession. While civil law systems facilitate an automatic transfer of property to heirs, common law systems necessitate a more structured and formal process. Understanding these distinctions is crucial for comprehending how different legal systems approach inheritance and the rights of heirs.

== See also ==
- Seisin
- Livery of seisin
- Sasine (Scots law)
- List of national legal systems
