= Holographic will =

Handwritten and signed will and testament

A holographic will, or olographic testament, is a will and testament which is a holographic document, meaning that it has been entirely handwritten and signed by the testator. Holographic wills have been treated differently by different jurisdictions throughout history. For example, some jurisdictions historically required that a holographic will had to be signed by witnesses attesting to the validity of the testator's signature and intent.

In many jurisdictions, holographic wills need to meet only minimal requirements to be valid:

- In case of doubt, there must be evidence that the testator actually created the will, which can be proved through the use of witnesses, handwriting experts, or other methods.
- The testator must have had the intellectual capacity to write the will, although there is a presumption that a testator had such capacity unless there is evidence to the contrary.
- The testator must be expressing a wish to direct the distribution of his or her estate (or parts thereof) to beneficiaries.

In other jurisdictions, holographic wills are only accepted if created in emergency situations, such as when the testator is alone, trapped, and near death. Some jurisdictions that do not generally recognize unwitnessed holographic wills grant exceptions to members of the armed services who are involved in armed conflicts and sailors at sea, though in both cases the validity of the holographic will expires at a certain time after it is drafted.

The format of a holographic will can vary greatly. The Guinness Book of World Records lists the shortest will in history as "Vše ženě" (Czech, "everything to wife"), written on the bedroom wall of a man who realized his imminent death. It was deemed to meet the minimum requirements under Czech inheritance law, being his own work and no one else's. On 8 June 1948, in Saskatchewan, Canada, a farmer named Cecil George Harris who had become trapped under his own tractor carved a will into the tractor's fender. It read, "In case I die in this mess I leave all to the wife. Cecil Geo. Harris." He died in that incident and so the fender was probated and was deemed valid as his will under Saskatchewan inheritance law. In the U.S. State of Arizona, the postscript to a letter was upheld as a valid holographic will.

== Law in various jurisdictions ==
=== Africa ===
==== Ghana ====
In Ghana, the Wills Act, 1971, does explicitly recognize holographic wills. Any will, typed or handwritten, can be probated, provided it is in writing, the testator signs at the bottom of the document, and it is signed by at least two witnesses. Active-duty members of the armed forces can create valid handwritten wills without any witnesses, or verbal wills with at least two witnesses.

==== Namibia ====
Wills in Namibia are governed by the Wills Act, 1953. This act stipulates that any mentally competent person of at least 16 years of age can execute a will, provided each page is signed by two witnesses who are neither beneficiaries nor executors of the will. In addition to recognizing any valid foreign wills, the act also allows active-duty military personnel to create a "soldier's will", which must be in writing, and which expires one year after the end of the testator's active-duty military service.

==== South Africa ====
Wills in South Africa are governed by the Wills Act 7 of 1953, which requires wills to be in written form, with signatures from the testator and two witnesses. Although the Wills Act does not directly provide for holographic wills, the Law of Succession Amendment Act 43 of 1992 allows a court to waive any formal requirements if the court is satisfied the testator intended for a document to serve as their last will and testament. A further exception exists for active-duty military personnel: the only formal requirement for a "soldier's will" is that it needs to be in writing, and it remains valid for up to one year after the end of active-duty military service.

=== Asia ===
==== Bangladesh ====
Holographic wills are referred to as "privileged will" under §65 of the Succession Act, 1925, and are permissible only for military personnel who have reached the age of 18 and are currently on an expedition. Under §66, the privileged will can be executed in writing or orally in front of two witnesses.

==== Philippines ====
Holographic wills are permissible under the Civil Code of the Philippines. As per Article 810, the will must be entirely handwritten by the testator, as well as signed and dated. There is no requirement for witnesses.

=== Europe ===
==== Austria ====
Holographic wills in Austria are legally binding, provided the entire will is personally handwritten and signed by the testator; section 578 of the Allgemeines bürgerliches Gesetzbuch (Austrian Civil Code) does not require the date or place of composition, although these are "advisable".

==== Belgium ====
Holographic wills are explicitly authorized under §4.180 of the Belgian Burgerlijk Wetboek/Code civil. As per §4.181, the will must be entirely handwritten, dated and signed by the testator.

==== Denmark ====
Under §65 of the Danish Inheritance Law (Arveloven), holographic wills are only permitted as "emergency testaments" ("Nødtestamente") for persons prevented by illness or other emergency from executing a conventional testament. Nødtestamente lapse after three months, unless the illness continued to prevent the testator from preparing a proper will.

==== Estonia ====
Holographic wills are permitted under §24 of the Law of Succession. The will must be entirely handwritten. Section 25 of the Law of Succession limits the validity of holographic wills to six months.

==== France ====
The Napoleonic Code explicitly allows for holographic wills. To be valid, it must be written in full, dated, and signed by the testator.

==== Germany ====
Holographic wills are recognized as valid in Germany under § 2247 of the Bürgerliches Gesetzbuch, provided the testator is both literate and at least 18 years of age. The testament must be entirely handwritten by the testator, must contain the date and place of composition, and must have the testator's signature at the bottom of the document.

==== Italy ====
In Italy, holographic wills are governed by article 602 of the Italian civil code. The will must be entirely handwritten and dated, with the testator's signature at the end of the will.

==== Latvia ====
Holographic wills are permitted under the Latvian Civil Code of 1937. The author of the document must write it by hand entirely. The Law will invalidate non-holographic wills by end of 2020, if only the signature is written by hand, and the document has not been presented to a notary.

==== Moldova ====
Holographic wills are governed by article 2223 of the Moldovan civil code. Holographic wills are permissible only if the testator is literate. The will must be handwritten and contain the testator's full name, signature, and the date of composition, although a will missing these elements can be accepted if it is otherwise possible to establish its validity. Any alterations must be signed and dated.

==== Netherlands ====
Under the Dutch Civil Code a "private act" (Dutch: onderhandse akte) is permissible but must be signed and deposited with a notary. Limited exceptions exist for members of the military during time of war, or persons aboard a seagoing ship or airplane.

==== Norway ====
Norwegian law allows holographic wills only in an emergency. They are valid until the testator has not been prevented from creating a proper will for a period of three months.

==== Romania ====
Holographic wills are governed by the Civil Code of Romania. To be valid, a holographic testament must be entirely handwritten, signed, and dated.

==== Spain ====
The Civil Code of Spain permits holographic wills under § 688 for persons of legal age. To be valid, the entire will must be handwritten by the testator, accompanied by a signature and date; foreigners may write holographic wills in their own language.

===== Catalonia =====
Catalonia, an autonomous community of Spain, permits holographic wills under article 421-17 of its civil code. It must be handwritten, with the testator's signature along with place and date of execution.

==== Switzerland ====
Holographic wills are governed by § 505 of the Swiss Civil Code and are valid for mentally sound persons at least 18 years of age. In order to be recognized as valid, a holographic will must be entirely handwritten and must contain the heading "Will"; the name, date of birth, and residence of the testator; a revocation of previous testaments; the provision of statutory entitlements to statutory heirs, such as children, spouse, registered partner, etc.; the place and date of composition; and the signature of the testator.

==== Ukraine ====
Under article 1247 of the Civil Code of Ukraine, wills are required to be in writing, with a signature and the indication of place and date of its execution. Wills also must be certified by a notary or other public official. The civil code also allows for persons aboard ships, in penal institutions, on active-duty military service, or in a medical facility to have their testament certified by a person in a position of authority (e.g. ship captain, warden, commanding officer, head physician). In these cases, two witnesses are required to sign the will. These witnesses may not be family members or heirs, and must be competent to read and sign a will.

==== United Kingdom ====
In the United Kingdom, unwitnessed holographic wills were valid in Scotland until the Requirements of Writing (Scotland) Act 1995 which abolished the provision; such wills written after 1 August 1995 are now invalid in England, Wales, Scotland, and Northern Ireland.

=== South America ===
==== Brazil ====
Holographic wills are permitted under article 1876 of the Brazilian civil code. To be valid, a testament must be fully handwritten and signed by its author, as well as signed by three witnesses. The law also allows for typed wills signed by three witnesses. If a handwritten will does not have the requisite witness signatures, it can be still accepted as valid at the judge's discretion, as per article 1879.

==== Chile ====
While article 1011 of the Chilean civil code simply requires wills to be written—without explicitly distinguishing between hand and typewritten—in practice, holographic wills are not permitted.

Article 1027 makes it possible, however, for a foreign holographic will to be valid in matters pertaining to the testator's relationship with Chilean nationals and his or her property in Chile.

=== North America ===
==== Canada ====
Inheritance law in Canada is constitutionally a provincial matter. The validity of holographic wills is governed by each province or territory.

===== Alberta =====
'Holograph wills' are explicitly recognized under Alberta's Wills and Succession Act. It must be signed by and wholly in the testator's own handwriting, but requires no witnesses or other formalities.

===== British Columbia =====
In British Columbia, wills are governed by the Wills, Estates and Succession Act. Holographic wills are not explicitly permitted by statute; §37 requires that a will be executed in writing with the signature of the testator and two witnesses. However, §58 permits courts to accept wills as valid that do not fulfill the formal validity requirements of the law, provided the court is satisfied the will represents the testamentary intentions of the deceased. The law explicitly allows for electronic documents, as well as handwritten changes to existing wills.

===== Ontario =====
Holographic wills are explicitly permitted by law in Ontario. It must be entirely handwritten and signed; no witnesses or formalities are required.

===== Quebec =====
In Quebec, a holographic will must be handwritten and signed. It is "preferable" to date it.

==== Mexico ====
Holographic wills are permitted under the Mexican Civil Code, Chapter IV. The author must be of legal age. The entire document must be handwritten, signed, and dated by the author; foreigners may prepare holographic wills in their own language. The author must then personally present the original and a copy, each marked with a fingerprint, to the General Archive of Notaries, in a sealed envelope. If the author is not personally known to the person in charge of the office, the author must bring two witnesses. This envelope is only to be opened by the probate judge in the presence of the witnesses and interested parties.

==== United States ====
The following states recognize holographic wills made within the state, though witnessing requirements vary: Alaska, Arizona, Arkansas, California, Colorado, Hawaii, Idaho, Kentucky, Louisiana, Maine, Michigan, Mississippi, Montana, Nebraska, Nevada, New Jersey, North Carolina, North Dakota, Oklahoma, Pennsylvania, South Dakota, Tennessee, Texas, Utah, Virginia, West Virginia, and Wyoming.

The following states do not recognize holographic wills made within the state, but recognize such wills under a "foreign wills" provision (i.e., the will was drafted wholly within, and in accordance with and is valid under the laws of, another jurisdiction): Iowa, Louisiana (which refers to it as a "foreign testament" provision.) Connecticut, Oregon, South Carolina, Washington, and Wisconsin.

Maryland and New York recognize holographic wills only if made by members of the Armed Forces. In both states any such will is void one year after that member's discharge from service "unless the testator ... does not then possess testamentary capacity" under Maryland law and for one year after the testator regains testamentary capacity under New York law. New York also recognizes holographic wills made by mariners at sea.

Indiana and Missouri have no statutes making references to holographic wills.

All other states not listed do not recognize a holographic will in any instance.

Selected excerpts from state statutes in United States jurisdictions that recognize holographic wills: (NOTE: The list is not exhaustive)

- Louisiana – under the Louisiana Civil Code such a will is known as an "olographic testament," and must be proved by the testimony of two credible witnesses that the testament was entirely written, dated, and signed in the testator's handwriting.
- Texas – under the Texas Estates Code (which replaced the prior Texas Probate Code), "a will written wholly in the testator's handwriting is not required to be attested by subscribing witnesses." However, a holographic will can be self-proved at creation by the testimony of two witnesses, both of whom must be at least age 14 when the will was formed (similar to a regular will); in addition, "[s]uch a will may be made self-proved at any time during the testator's lifetime by the attachment or annexation thereto of an affidavit by the testator to the effect that the instrument is his last will; that he was at least eighteen years of age when he executed it (or, if under such age, was or had been lawfully married, or was then a member of the armed forces of the United States or of an auxiliary thereof or of the Maritime Service); that he was of sound mind; and that he has not revoked such instrument." But if the will was not self-proved, at probate "a will wholly in the handwriting of the testator may be proved by two witnesses to his handwriting, which evidence may be by sworn testimony or affidavit taken in open court, or, if such witnesses are non-residents of the county or are residents who are unable to attend court, by deposition, either written or oral, taken in accordance with Section 51.203 [of the Texas Estates Code] or the Texas Rules of Civil Procedure."
- Utah – upon clear and convincing evidence proof the decedent possessed intent to make a valid will, signed by the testator with material portions of the document in the testator's handwriting, and describing specific bequests with reasonable certainty. No witnesses required.
- Virginia – upon clear and convincing evidence proof the decedent possessed intent to make a valid will, signed by the testator, the will must be wholly in the handwriting of the testator (handwriting proven by at least two disinterested witnesses or the will was written in the presence of one disinterested witness if executed before 1922).

=== Oceania ===
==== Australia ====
Every state or territory has its own laws governing the validity of wills. Holographic wills are not provided for by statute in Australia, but can be accepted at the discretion of a court. Generally, a will must be in writing and signed by the testator as well as by two witnesses. If these requirements are not met, the will is deemed an "informal will". A court can accept an informal will if it is judged to be an authentic representation of the decedent's last wishes. An informal will can "be found in almost any form and made in almost any manner"; in 2017, an "unsent text message with a smiley face" was ruled to be a legally binding will.

===== Australian Capital Territory =====
A will must be in writing, signed by the testator, as well as signed by two witnesses. Any will not fulfilling these criteria is an "informal will", which can be accepted by a court as per the Wills Act 1968.

===== New South Wales =====
To be valid, wills are governed by section 6 of the Succession Act 2006. This stipulates that for a will to be valid, it must be in writing, and must be signed or acknowledged in the presence of two or more witnesses, who themselves must attest and sign the will. If these conditions are not met, courts can still probate the "informal will" if it is judged that the deceased intended for the document to serve as their last will and testament.

===== Northern Territory =====
A will must be written, signed, and dated, with two signatures from witnesses who are not beneficiaries. It is possible for a will that does not meet these conditions to be judged as valid.

===== Queensland =====
Wills in Queensland are governed by the Succession Act 1981. A will is required to be in writing with two witnesses. Wills that do not meet these conditions can still be judged to be legally valid. In 2013, a court ruled that a DVD labeled "my will" was legally binding; in 2017, the Supreme Court of Queensland ruled that an unsent text message was a valid will.

===== South Australia =====
In South Australia, wills are governed by the Will Act 1936. A will must be in writing and signed by the testator and two witnesses;, and it must appear that the testator intended for the will to be valid. If these conditions are not met, courts can waive these requirements if they are satisfied that a document expresses the testamentary intentions of the decedent. Members of the defense forces or sailors at sea are considered "privileged testators" and can make an oral will.

===== Tasmania =====
A will must be in writing, signed, and signed by two witnesses who are not beneficiaries. These requirements can be waived by a court if they are satisfied that the document was intended to serve as a will.

===== Victoria =====
For a will to be valid in Victoria, it must be in writing, and signed by the testator and two witnesses. The testator must be of sound mind.

===== Western Australia =====
A will must be in writing, dated, and signed by the testator and two witnesses.

==== Federated States of Micronesia ====
Holographic wills are permitted, but the handwriting and signature must be verified by two witnesses.

==== New Zealand ====
The validity of wills in New Zealand is governed by §11 of the Wills Act 2007. A will must be in writing, signed, and witnessed to be valid. These requirements can be waived if the High Court of New Zealand is satisfied that the testator intended for the document to serve as their will. For active-duty military and "seagoing persons", any informal testament, "written or oral", can be considered valid, provided the court is satisfied that the will represents the decedent's testamentary intentions.

== In popular literature ==
A holographic will is the subject of John Grisham's 1999 legal thriller The Testament, and also his 2013 novel Sycamore Row.

Serving at a Battalion Aid station under heavy enemy fire, Hawkeye Pierce creates a holographic will in the M*A*S*H episode "Where There's A Will, There's A War".

The final episode of the Netflix series House of Cards includes a holographic will as a crucial element of the plot—although if, as is implied, the will was written in a Washington, DC hotel, it would not be legally valid, as local inheritance law generally does not recognize holographic wills.

In Season 1 of 'Bosch: Legacy', Whitney Vance leaves behind a handwritten letter to Harry Bosch in addition to a holographic will with the Vance family pen to verify its authenticity. Honey Chandler recognizes that holographic wills are valid in California.
