= Inheritance law in Bulgaria =

Inheritance law regulates the financial consequences that arise as a result of the death of individuals, as well as the subsequent transfer of their assets. The governing legislation in Bulgaria that regulates the legal aspects of this subject is the Bulgarian Inheritance Act (Bulgarian: Закон за наследството).

== Sources of law ==
The main legal source is the Inheritance Act (BG "Закон за наследството", entered into force on 30 April 1949). The Act stipulates that inheritance can be inherited either by means of:

- Statutory provisions

or:

- A will which contains the testator's expressed will.

== Statutory succession (Chapter 2 of the Bulgarian Inheritance Act) ==
The right of inheritance is usually governed by statutory provisions which set out the order of succession by the respective successors. The Bulgarian Inheritance Act provides for four levels of successors in order of succession rights whereby those in the preceding level exclude those in the successive ones. The inheritance shall be received by the following natural persons according to the following order:

- Level I: descendants of the deceased;
- Level II: the parents of the deceased
- Level III:
1. grandparents of the deceased and their descendants;
2. siblings of the deceased and their descendants;
- Level IV Collateral heirs from the third to the sixth level of inheritance.

In addition, the spouse of the deceased inherits together with the heirs of the first to the third level and replaces the heirs in the fourth level. It shall be noted that legal entities do not have capacity to receive inheritance.

== Testament ==
Article 13 of the Bulgarian Inheritance Act provides that each person, having reached the age of 18, may dispose of his property upon his death through a Will, provided that he has capacity to act independently and reasonably. The testator may dispose of all of his assets or only parts of it through a Will. The testator may dispose of all of his assets provided that he does not infringe the legally compulsory portion of the inheritance. The Bulgarian Inheritance Act provides for two types of testament:

1. The notarial testament (Art. 24(2)) which is to be drafted by the notary in the presence of two witnesses.
2. The handwritten will (Art. 25) must be personally handwritten by the testator. At the request of the testator, the handwritten will could be kept by a notary or by a third party for safekeeping purposes. This will must be signed by the testator.

The repeal of a testamentary disposition is possible in the cases provided in Article 38 of the Bulgarian Inheritance Act: by drawing a new will or a notarial document expressing the testator's explicit wish to withdraw the last will. According to Article 42 may be void in the following cases:

- When the testamentary disposition has been made in favour of a person who does not have testamentary capacity;
- When testamentary disposition has been made by mistake, under coercion or fraud;
- If the motive for the disposition itself is contrary to the law, public order or moral

== Compulsory portion ==
If the deceased has left descendants, parents or a spouse, he shall not deprive them from their compulsory portion either through his testamentary disposition or a gift. The testator shall only dispose of the rest of his assets.

== Acceptance and waiver of inheritances ==
The heir is vested with inheritance by means of the testator's wishes. The acceptance of the inheritance is not limited in time. However, once the heir has accepted the inheritance, he may no longer withdraw his acceptance. The inheritance may be accepted by two affirmative legal acts:

- explicitly - by a written declaration to the district court in the place of accrual of the inheritance, which is to be registered in a designated book (Article 49(1));
- implicitly - by an act of heirs which unambiguously indicates his intention to accept the inheritance or when if he hides the property (Art. 49(2)).

The waiver of the succession is carried out by a written declaration to the district court. The declaration is registered in a designated book. The law provides for nullity of the waiver if it is limited, made only for a part of the inheritance or under certain conditions. In case the heir has renounced his share of the inheritance or has otherwise lost his inheritance rights, the shares of the other heirs increase accordingly.

Inheritance in Bulgaria is subject to inheritance tax.
