= Thomas Shapiro =

American sociologist (born 1947)

Thomas M. Shapiro
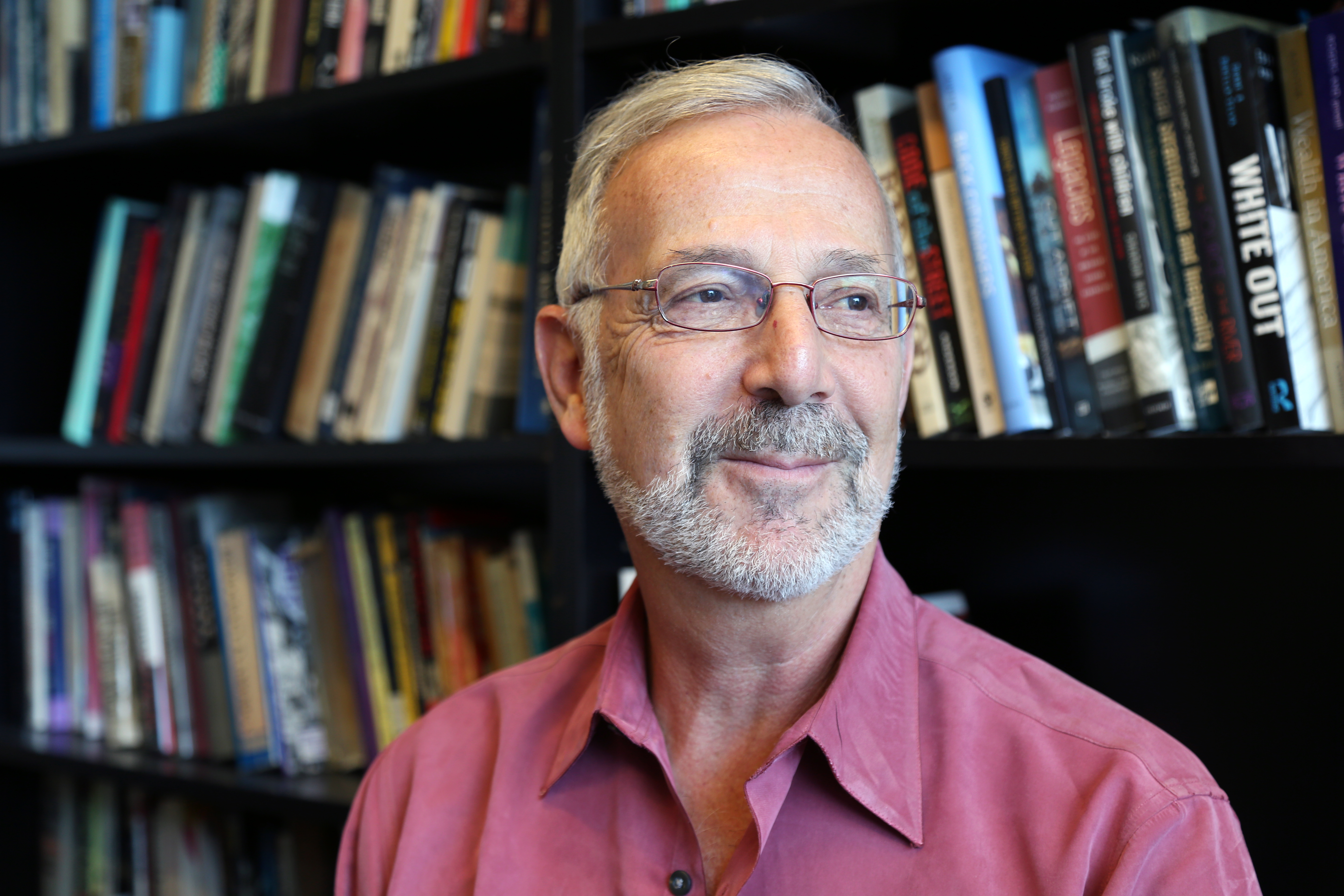
- Born: April 24, 1947 (age 79); Los Angeles, California
- Education: University of Wisconsin–Madison; Washington University in St. Louis
- Occupations: Sociologist, author
- Spouse: Ruth Birnber
- Children: 1
- Writing career
- Subject: Sociology

Thomas M. Shapiro (born 1947) is a professor of Sociology and Public Policy at Brandeis University and is the author of The Hidden Cost of Being African American and the co-author of Black Wealth/White Wealth. Shapiro's current professional titles include the Pokross Professor of Law and Social Policy and the Director of the Institute on Assets and Social Policy. The primary areas of focus for Shapiro's research and publications are racial inequality and public policy.

== Early life and education ==
Thomas M. Shapiro was born in Los Angeles on April 24, 1947. He received his B.A. degree from the University of Wisconsin–Madison in 1969. Shapiro went on to receive both his M.A. degree (1971) and Ph.D. (1978) from Washington University in St. Louis.

== Writings ==
Thomas Shapiro's first book was Population Control Politics, published in 1985, which focused primarily on female sterilization, the welfare state, and public policy in the United States.

Shapiro co-authored Black Wealth/White Wealth with Professor Melvin L. Oliver, which was originally published in 1995; a tenth-anniversary edition was published in 2006. Black Wealth/White Wealth investigates racial inequality in the United States, however, what sets Black Wealth/White Wealth apart from the numerous other works on racial inequality from this time period is that Shapiro and Oliver examine racial inequality through the lens of wealth. The book demonstrates that a huge wealth gap exists between white and black Americans (according to the book, black families have, on average, 10 cents of wealth for every dollar white families have). Although the income gap between whites and blacks has narrowed, Shapiro and Oliver argue that the remarkable differences in wealth, and the impact that these differences have on housing, education, and more. Both also challenge the notion of growing equality between races in the United States.

Great Divides: Readings in Social Inequality in the United States is a textbook on American social inequality compiled by Thomas Shapiro with contributions from classical and contemporary writers. Great Divides has gone through three editions; the first was published in 1998, and the other two editions followed in 2001 and 2005. According to Shapiro, the purpose of Great Divides is to examine the barriers between groups and individuals and to evaluate the impact that these barriers have had, and continue to have, on American society. Additionally, and unlike existing readers on social inequality, Shapiro seeks to meld older, more famous texts (from authors such as Max Weber and W. E. B. Du Bois) with cutting-edge research on the subject of inequality, thereby creating a more comprehensive and challenging text for students.

In his 2004 publication The Hidden Cost of Being African American, Shapiro focuses on the importance of family wealth and the central role that it plays in passing down racial inequality from generation to generation in the United States. Drawing from interviews with 182 black, white and Latino families with school aged children in Boston, Los Angeles, and St. Louis, Shapiro argues that there continues to be a substantial racial wealth gap in the United States. Shapiro also claims that families lacking financial assets, characteristically the African American population, are hindered from becoming upwardly mobile in American society. 3/4 of the people that Shapiro interviewed were middle class and 1/4 were working class or poor. These same inherited, transformative assets are leveraged by whites, enabling them to take fuller advantage of economic opportunities and accumulate additional wealth, what many refer to as White privilege. This vicious cycle, Shapiro argues, has the effect of perpetuating and worsening racial inequality in the United States. Shapiro focuses on the "big picture" of wealth dynamics in the United States and explores how family money effects racial inequality. His book is organized around the ideas that inheritance and racial discrimination are making inequality between whites and African Americans worse. He coins the term "transformative assets" as money that is acquired through family that allows for social mobility beyond what their current income level would allow for. He shows that different starting lines of wealth for different people has a huge impact on inequalities and that race plays a huge role in determining your starting place. In terms of racial equality, inherited wealth and housing discrimination limit educational and employment gains which have a huge impact on social mobility. More narrowly, Shapiro also focuses on the advantages that transformative assets have on the value of housing and the subsequent quality of neighborhoods and schools, to the additional benefit of whites and disadvantage of blacks.

In his 2017 book, Toxic Inequality: How America's Wealth Gap Destroys Mobility, Deepens the Racial Divide, & Threatens Our Future, Shapiro argues that wealth disparities and racial inequities must be understood in tandem. Following nearly two hundred families of different races and income levels over a period of twelve years, Shapiro's research vividly documents the recession's toll on parents and children, the ways families use wealth to manage crises and create opportunities, and the real reasons some families build wealth while others struggle in poverty.

== Bibliography ==
Books

- Black Wealth/White Wealth: A New Perspective on Racial Inequality (with Melvin L. Oliver). Tenth Anniversary Edition. New York: Routledge, 2006.
- Great Divides: Readings in Social Inequality in the United States. Third Edition. Boston: McGraw-Hill, 2005.
- The Hidden Cost of Being African American: How Wealth Perpetuates Inequality. New York: Oxford University Press, 2004.
- Black Wealth/White Wealth: A New Perspective on Racial Inequality (with Melvin L. Oliver). New York: Routledge, 1995.
- Population Control Politics: Women, Sterilization, and Reproductive Choice. Philadelphia: Temple University Press, 1985.

Selected Articles

- "Economic (In)Security: The Experience of the African-American and Latino Middle Classes" (with Jennifer Wheary, Tamara Draut, and Tatajana Meschede). Demos and IASP. February, 2008.
- "By A Thread: The New Experience of America's Middle Class" (with Jennifer Wheary and Tamara Draut). Demos and IASP. November, 2007.
- "Race, Homeownership and Wealth." Washington University Journal of Law & Policy 20. (2006).
- "The Racial Wealth Gap." African Americans and the U.S. Economy. Ed. Conrad, Whitehead, Mason & Stewart. Rowman & Littlefield, 2005.
- "Good Neighborhoods, Good Schools: Race and the Good Choices of White Families (with Heather Johnson)." White Out: The Continuing Significance of Racism. Ed. Doan, Ashley & Eduardo Bonilla-Silva. Routledge, 2003.
- "Wealth of a Nation: A Reassessment of Asset Inequality in America Shows at Least One Third of Households Are Asset-Poor" (with Melvin L. Oliver). The American Journal of Economics and Sociology. Vol. 49, No. 2. (Apr., 1990), pp. 129–151.

== Awards ==
- Residency Fellow, Rockefeller Study and Conference Center, Bellagio, Italy (2005)
- The Hidden Cost of Being African American named one of the Best Books of the Year, St. Louis Post-Dispatch (2004)
- Distinguished Scholarly Publication Award, American Sociological Association (1997)
- C. Wright Mills Award, Society for the Study of Social Problems (1996)

== Personal life ==
Shapiro is married to Ruth Birnberg. They have one child.

== See also ==
- Race and inequality in the United States
