= Saadiah ben Joseph =

Saadiah ben Joseph ha-Levi was a rabbi who lived in Yemen in the 16th century. He lived in Sanaa in 1568 at the time of persecution of Jews there, and later moved to Jibla. Zechariah Dhahiri wrote a poem in his honor, which appears in Dhahiri's Sefer Hamussar.

He composed a work Sefer Hayerushot on Jewish inheritance law.

He was the author of a number of piyyutim.
