= Undue influence =

Seizing control of a person's will for gain

Undue influence (UI) is a concept in legal systems to describe a psychological process by which a person's free will and judgement is supplanted by that of another. The strict definition for UI varies by jurisdiction. Generally speaking, UI is a means by which a person gains control over their victims' decision making through manipulation tactics or unfair pressure, typically for financial gain. Historically, UI has been poorly understood, even in some legal circles.

Undue influence is typically perpetrated by a person who is trusted by the victim, and the victim is in some way dependent on the person for emotional and physical needs. Caregivers are often found to have unduly influenced their patients, however, anyone in a position of trust and authority over the victim may potentially be guilty of UI. This may include the victims' attorney, accountant or others with fiduciary oblications, nursing home attendant, or even their children and other immediate family members.

UI is typically seen as a process, not a single event. A manipulator may spend weeks, months, or even years before successfully unduly-influencing their victim. Anyone is potentially susceptible to UI, but the elderly are particularly vulnerable. Perpetrators of UI operate in shadow, enacting their manipulation behind closed doors where there are no witnesses. A person being unduly influenced may become withdrawn, depressive and passive. Physical signs of abuse may include unexplained bruising, scratches, and/or broken bones. Other signs may include missing or broken dentures, prescription eyeglasses, hearing aids or other assistive devices.

A distinction is made between the nature of capacity and undue influence. In assessing capacity, the practitioner evaluates an individual's ability to competently perform tasks (e.g., execute a will or give medical consent). These assessments give insight to the functioning of the cognitive capabilities at that moment in time. Conversely, screening for undue influence is focused on the process of events which occur over an extended period. To determine whether another person is leveraging unfair tactics on the victim, an assessment specific to undue influence is required.

Undue influence occurs in various circumstances including, but not limited to domestic violence, hostage situations, cults, prisoners of war, and dictatorships. The common theme among these situations is the aspect of psychological manipulation. Traumatic bonding may occur between the victim and influencer, as a result, the victim may even defend the perpetrator. The effectiveness of cult tactics (e.g. love bombing) on young and healthy individuals illustrates that anyone, regardless of mental status, is a potential victim of UI under certain circumstances.

Elderly Americans are living longer, and with this increased life expectancy, the prevalence of cognitive disorders associated with advanced age has also increased. A significant concentration of wealth is controlled by this aging demographic making them a potential target for exploitation. Modern families are becoming more complex and dispersed. Given these factors, the number of will contests involving undue influence is expected to increase.

== Susceptibility ==
Some factors have been identified that increase the likelihood of a person being susceptible to manipulation. Some of these factors include, but are not limited to:

- Age – Much like traditional scams, the elderly are especially susceptible to undue influence.
- Isolation – Family conflict, living alone, no living relatives or physical factors such as distance or difficulties with communication.
- Terminal diagnosis – Being diagnosed with a terminal illness such as cancer typically causes the victim to experience stress and trauma which increases their susceptibility.
- Depression – The effects of depression are pernicious and contribute to a person becoming predisposed to undue influence.
- Dependency – When a victim is dependent upon the influencer for companionship, transportation, housekeeping, food, hydration, medicine, etc.
- Diminished mental capacity – Mental function declines, particularly as a result of aging. A person having difficulty thinking clearly may look to another to think things through for them.
- Substance use – Illicit drugs, alcohol, or prescribed medication may alter a person's judgment. Drugs can also cause addiction, and the influencer may leverage the addiction to control the person. The influencer may refuse to give the addicted person their pain medication unless the victim does things for the influencer they wouldn't normally do.
- Recent bereavement – The death of a family member such as a spouse or child.

== Tactics ==
A person seeking to exert undue influence on another person usually does so by leveraging their position of apparent authority. Some of these tactics include:

- Isolating the victim from their family and support system. Influencers often restrict access to their victim and maintain physical control. Supervising visits, refusing visitation, and denying requests to speak to the victim are indicative of undue influence. If the victim requires medical care or has an appointment the influencer is unable to attend, they will often change or cancel the appointment.
- Controlling their victims through sleep deprivation, overmedication, or refusal to administer drugs such as naloxone, pain medication, etc.
- Moving into the victims' home, changes in victim's spending habits, unexplained purchases, and/or using victims' credit cards.
- Controlling the flow of information to manipulate the victim and their view of the world. Limiting the free flow of information enables the influencer to distort the truth. This allows the influencer to portray a false narrative to their victim which helps them facilitate their manipulation. This often includes restricting access to the victims' phone, not answering phone calls, responding to texts, using the victims' computer, and not allowing people to visit. If visitation does occur, the influencer is often nearby and will attempt to govern the interaction.
- Emotional manipulation is often leveraged. Influencers tend to occupy a position to access their victim's medical records and other sensitive information. This helps them prey on their victim's emotions such as anxiety, depression, grief, fear, regret, humiliation, isolation, and loneliness.
- Relationship poisoning is a process by which a person instills thoughts and beliefs in their victim causing them to distrust third-parties. Statements such as - "Your children aren't even around", "I'm the only one that's here for you, nobody else cares" or, "your friends are only coming around because they want to take advantage of you", are examples of relationship poisoning. These tactics are used to manipulate and isolate the victim while increasing their dependence on the perpetrator.
- Encouraging dependency — victims often find themselves dependent on the influencer for transportation, food, hydration, and medication. The influencer will often make threats to the victim to increase their dependency such as: "if I wasn't here, you'd be put into a nursing home".
- Posturing as advocates and protectors of the victim to make onlookers less distrustful. An influencer will often act as though they are genuine advocates for the victim and maintain a superficial appearance of friendliness and care. However, when alone with the victim, perpetrators tend to neglect providing care such as personal hygiene, nutrition, hydration, medicine, and other basic needs.
- Actively involving themselves in finances and financial instruments of the victim. An influencer will often initiate changes in financial documents. This may include directly or indirectly arranging for attorney's to alter estate documents. Perpetrators may attempt to become beneficiaries on brokerage and/or retirement accounts. Influencers tend to assist in securing legal documents such as competency letters and/or powers of attorney.
- Encouraging the victim to make rushed decisions at inappropriate times, such as changes to important documents while distressed( e.g. in the hospital or the same day as doctor visits and/or medical treatments).

== Legal malpractice in estate planning ==
Lawsuits against estate planning attorneys have increased in recent years. Legal malpractice in trusts and estates is now considered to have the highest risk of exposure, representing 12% of all legal malpractice claims. Due to changes in privity laws, many states allow third-party beneficiaries to bring a lawsuit against an attorney who executed a will that is later deemed to be a product of undue influence. Experienced estate attorneys tend to be vigilant of "red flags" indicative of undue influence during the drafting and execution of a will. Because a will is the most important document most individuals sign in their lives, and it affects property rights for all time, the process should be taken seriously. Many attorneys incorrectly assume that estate planning is a simple area of law. Some less-informed attorneys believe estate planning to be a simple, fast, and easy way to make a quick buck, this could not be farther from the truth. An attorney involved in estate planning should exercise diligence and thoroughly document their work in the event they find themselves exposed to a malpractice suit. Ignoring indications of UI by the estate planning attorney can put them in a precarious position of needing to explain why they redirected a testator's estate while their client was unduly influenced.

== Presumption ==
Because of the secrecy and tactics leveraged by an influencer, direct evidence of wrongdoing is often impossible for the contestant of a will to produce. Access to the individual is typically controlled by the influencer so that friends and family are unable to observe the perpetrator engaging in manipulation, thus a challenger is often unable to provide direct evidence. In an effort to address this substantial power distinction, many states allow for the burden of proof to be shifted to the alleged influencer if certain requirements are satisfied. Jurisdictions vary as to the requirements, but in general, the burden is shifted when the combination of a confidential or fiduciary relationship with the donor and suspicious circumstances are found. Such circumstances include:

- Old age and weakened physical or mental condition of the testator
- Lack of consideration of the bequest
- Unnatural or unjust disposition of the property
- Participation of the beneficiary in procuring the gift
- Domination or control over the donor by the beneficiary
- Secrecy, concealment, or failure to disclose the gift

Once shifted, the proponent of the contested will is tasked with rebutting the presumption. The alleged influencer is required to prove that the testator made the will of their own volition, and was not under any influence at the time it was executed.

== History ==
Undue influence originated from English common-law in a doctrine from 1617. Chancellor Bacon found that a woman who "worked on the simplicity and weakness" of an elderly man was guilty of undue influence.

== Research ==
=== The California Undue Influence Screening Tool ===
A focus group and a panel of experts were tasked to undertake a study to develop a tool to assist Adult Protective Services, legal professionals, and health practitioners in identifying potential instances of UI. The experts included: (1) a licensed psychologist who specializes in forensic neuropsychology; (2) an expert in the criminal prosecution of elder abuse; (3) a probate attorney with extensive experience with conservatorships, estate planning, and undue influence; and (4) a professor of gerontology with expertise in elder abuse. The resulting product is referred to as the California Undue Influence Screening Tool (CUIST). The tool can be used to help identify instances of UI in all fifty states. The study revealed similarities in persons who were particularly susceptible to unduly influence such as:

- Vulnerability of the victim - Age, weakened physical or mental state.
- Dependency - Reliant on the influencer.
- Isolation - The victim may live alone or in a remote area, suffering from family conflict or having no living relatives.
- Fear - Instilling fear (e.g. threatening to place victim in a nursing home.)
- Apparent authority of the influencer - The influencer will act as though that authority has been vested in them by the victim. Claiming to be the victim's spouse or romantic partner is another tactic an influencer may leverage to misrepresent themselves as having authority over the victim.
- Manipulation - Leveraging opportunity and vulnerabilities to take advantage of the victim. Situations are exploited in which the victim relinquishes assets that the influencer desires. These can take many forms such as depriving the victim of sleep or controlling nutrition, hydration, medication, and enacting mental pressure and physical harm. Pressuring the victim to make changes to documents when they are in pain, confused, or have recently undergone medical treatment.
- Process over time - Undue influence occurs over time. Influencers often learn to decipher their victim's needs and desires, they will leverage them to gain a foothold in the persons' life.
- Deliberate isolation - Influencers work to isolate their victims in various ways. Some methods include, "poisoning relationships" with existing friends or family. Shielding the victim from their support network (e.g., friends and family). Firing existing caregivers, canceling medical appointments, treatments, and trips for medicine or care.
- Result of consequences - Loss of assets, physical harm, neglect. Financial loss including home and/or savings.

Undue influence has been studied in the field of social psychology. The American Bar Association Commission on Law and Aging and the American Psychological Association have analyzed similarities between cult members and domestic violence. These accounts share an element of power distinction between the alleged influencer and the vulnerable adult.

=== Clinical models of undue influence ===
Clinical models have been developed in an effort to assist clinicians and practitioners in determining if UI is present and to build a legal case. Some of the most prevalent models are discussed below.

==== The IDEAL model ====
The IDEAL model was developed by the psychiatrist Bennet Blum, M.D., it emphasized the social conditions frequently observed in cases of alleged undue influence. It focuses on five aspects:

- Isolation from friends and family
- dependency on the perpetrator
- emotional manipulation of the victim
- the acquiescence of the victim as a result of the three previous factors
- the financial loss of the victim

==== The SCAM model ====
The SCAM model was developed by Susan I. Bernantz, Ph.D., it contains four elements regarding undue influence:

- Susceptibility of the victim
- Presence of a confidential and trusting relationship between the victim and perpetrator
- initiation (active procurement) of financial transactions by the perpetrator
- monetary loss of the victim

==== The IPA analysis framework ====
The IPA analysis framework is the result of a task force formed by The International Psychogeriatrics Association called Testamentary Capacity and Undue Influence. It consists of reviews on international law and common legal definitions of undue influence. The authors noted risk factors which include:

Environmental risk factors

- social isolation
- family conflict
- dependency, especially if a change in circumstances occurred

Psychological risk factors

- physical disability
- substance use
- cognitive impairment
- mental illness

== New Zealand ==
=== Case law ===
- Contractors Bonding v Snee: while Mrs Snee's son exercised undue influence over her, it has no legal impact on the relationship between her and Contractors Bonding regarding her mortgage.

== See also ==
- Mind control
- Elder abuse
